= Birendra of Nepal =

King of Nepal from 1972 to 2001

Birendra
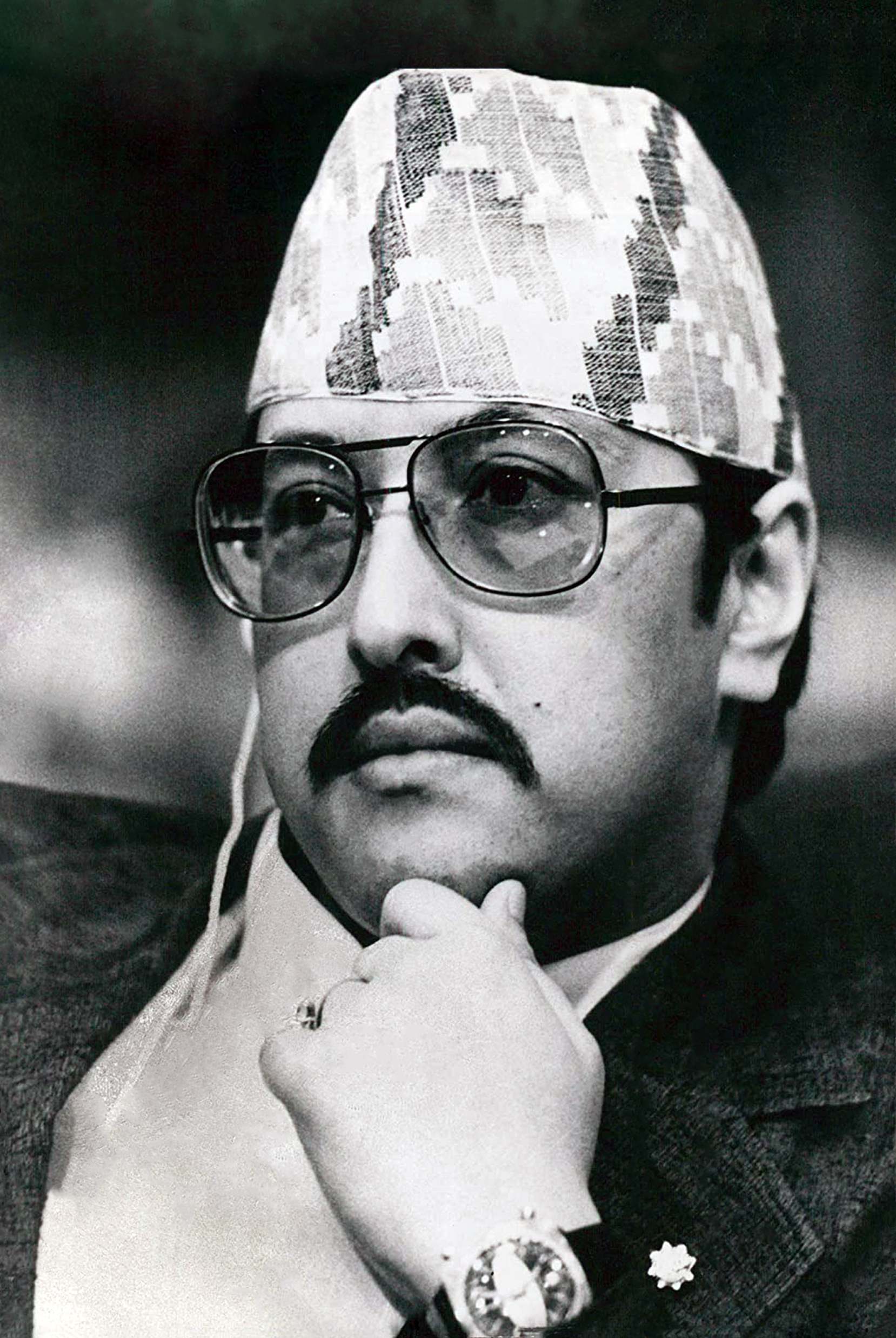
- Birendra c. 1967

King of Nepal
- Reign: 31 January 1972 – 1 June 2001
- Coronation: 24 February 1975
- Predecessor: Mahendra
- Successor: Dipendra
- Prime ministers: See list: Kirti Nidhi Bista Nagendra Prasad Rijal Tulsi Giri Surya Bahadur Thapa Lokendra Bahadur Chand Marich Man Singh Shrestha Krishna Prasad Bhattarai Girija Prasad Koirala Man Mohan Adhikari Sher Bahadur Deuba
- Born: Birendra Bir Bikram Shah Dev; 29 December 1945; Narayanhiti Royal Palace, Kingdom of Nepal
- Died: 1 June 2001 (aged 55); Narayanhiti Royal Palace, Kathmandu, Nepal
- Cause of death: Assassination (gunshot wounds)
- Spouse: Queen Aishwarya (m. 1970)
- Issue: King Dipendra; Princess Shruti; Prince Nirajan
Names
- Birendra Bir Bikram Shah Dev; Nepali: वीरेन्द्र वीर विक्रम शाह देव
Regnal name
- Shri Panch Maharajadhiraj Birendra Bir Bikram Shah Dev; Nepali: श्री५ महाराजाधिराज वीरेन्द्र वीर विक्रम शाह देव
- Dynasty: Shah
- Father: King Mahendra
- Mother: Indra Rajya Lakshmi Devi
- Religion: Hinduism

Sri Panch Birendra Bir Bikram Shah Dev (Nepali: श्री५ वीरेन्द्र वीर विक्रम शाह देव; 29 December 1945 – 1 June 2001) was King of Nepal from 1972 until his assassination in the 2001 Nepalese royal massacre.

Birendra was the first son of King Mahendra and crown princess Indra. He inherited the panchayat system from his father when he acceded the throne in 1972, ruling as Nepal's absolute monarch. Following the 1990 revolution, he disbanded the system, lifted the concurrent ban on political parties and promulgated a new constitution in which he served as head of state of a democratic constitutional monarchy. The Nepalese Civil War began in the latter part of his reign when the Communist Party of Nepal (Maoist) launched an insurgency in 1996.

== Early life and education ==
Birendra was born at the Narayanhiti Royal Palace in Kathmandu as the second son of the then Crown Prince Mahendra Bir Bikram Shah Dev and his first wife, Crown Princess Indra Rajya Lakshmi Devi. Despite Birendra not being the eldest son of Mahendra, he was made crown prince and heir apparent due to Mahendra's first son, Rabindra Shah, being born when he was unmarried, and to a Gurung woman, which made him an "illegitimate child".

Birendra spent eight years studying at St Joseph's School, a Jesuit school in Darjeeling, with his brother Gyanendra. On 13 March 1955, their grandfather King Tribhuvan died and their father succeeded to the Nepalese throne. With his father's accession, Birendra became the crown prince of Nepal.

In 1959, Birendra was enrolled at Eton College in the United Kingdom. After studying at Eton until 1964, he returned to Nepal, where he began to explore the country, traveling on foot to remote parts of the country where he lived humbly with what was available in the villages. He later completed his education by spending some time at the University of Tokyo, before studying political theory at Harvard University from 1967 to 1968. Birendra enjoyed travelling in his youth, and went on trips to Canada, Latin America, Africa, many parts of India, and a number of other Asian countries. He was also an art collector and supporter of Nepalese craftspeople and artists, and learned to fly helicopters.

Birendra was married to Aishwarya Rajya Lakshmi Devi from the Rana family, his second cousin, on 27 February 1970. The wedding, which was billed as one of the most lavish Hindu nuptial ceremonies in history, cost $9.5 million to stage.

== Reign ==
=== Early years ===
Birendra ascended to the Nepalese throne on 31 January 1972, at the age of 26, after the death of his father, King Mahendra. However, his coronation was delayed until 24 February 1975, when he was 29, since the first year was considered to be a mourning period for death of king's father and the second year was deemed to be inauspicious by religious astrologers. As a Hindu monarch, he had to follow Nepalese tradition.

=== Panchayat era ===
On his ascension to the throne, Birendra was effectively an absolute monarch, as he inherited a country where political parties were banned and he ruled through a system of local and regional councils known as panchayats.

In an attempt to maintain the panchayat system of government, prominent leaders of the Nepali Congress Party were arrested frequently. During the 1980s the restraints that had been imposed on political organizations were eased, and liberal student-led groups started to demand constitutional change in Nepal. Because of the growing pro-democracy movement Birendra announced that a referendum to decide between a party-less or a multi-party system would be held. During, referendum options were given for a multi-party system or a Panchayati system. The referendum was held in May 1980 with the party-less system winning by a margin of 55% to 45%. The result of the election led the king to make mass restructuring of country both economically and politically. After the national referendum, he divided the nation into 5 development regions in order to create balanced development and visited each division once a year; the visits were discontinued after his status as a constitutional monarchy in 1990.

=== Democratic era ===
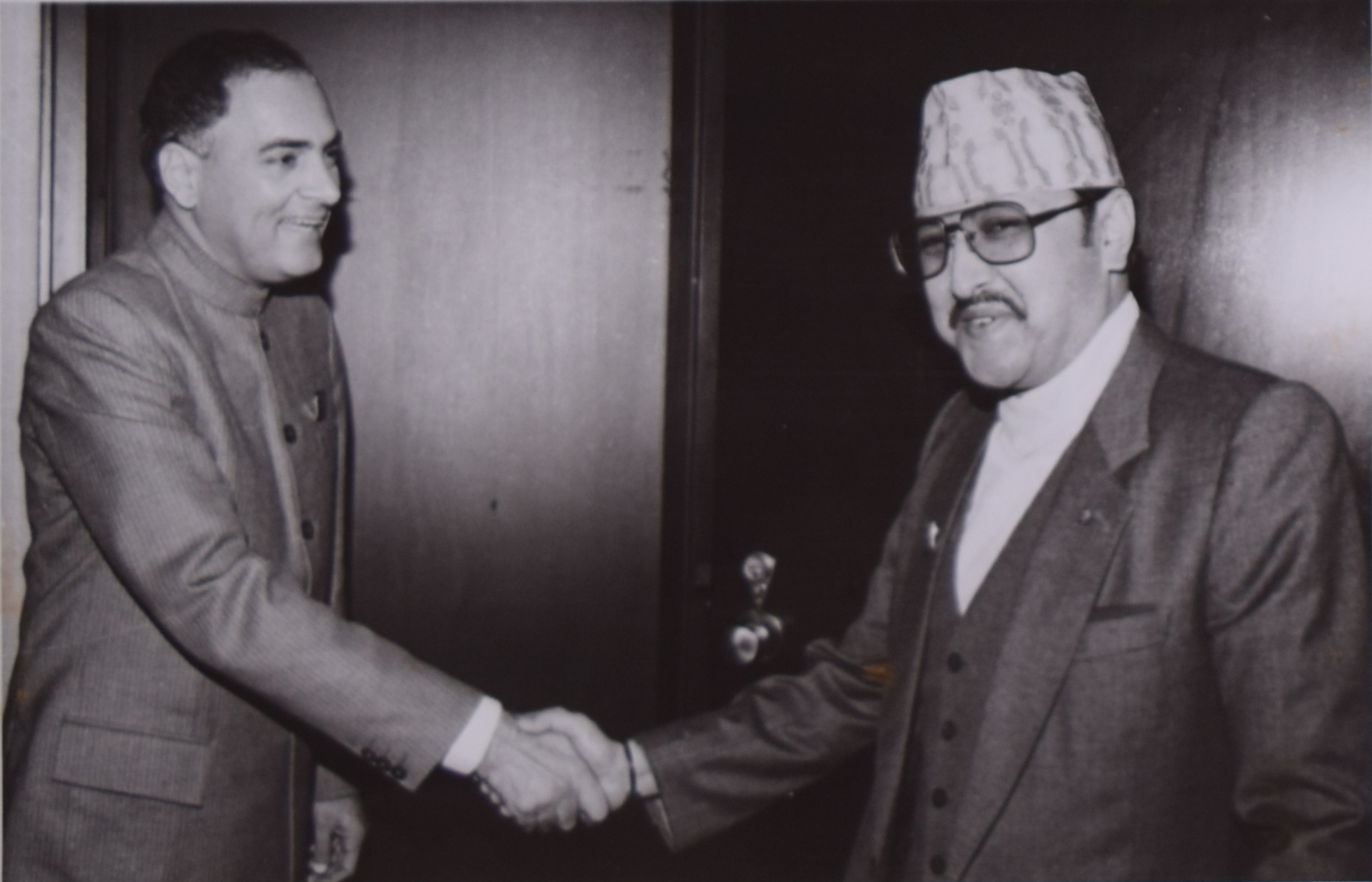
Birendra shaking hands with Indian Prime Minister Rajiv Gandhi, 1985

In 1990, a series of strikes and pro-democracy riots broke out in Nepal. Due to the riots, Birendra lifted the ban on political parties and agreed to become a constitutional monarch in April 1990. He appointed an independent Constitution Recommendation Commission to represent the main opposition factions and to prepare a new constitution to accommodate their demands for political reform. The commission presented him with the draft of the proposed constitution on 10 September 1990. The new constitution would make Birendra head of state of a constitutional monarchy with a system of multiparty democracy. The draft constitution was approved by the Prime Minister Krishna Prasad Bhattarai and his cabinet and so, on 9 November 1990, Birendra promulgated the new constitution that transformed Nepal into a constitutional monarchy. As a constitutional monarch, Birendra became more popular than he had been as an autocratic ruler attributing to his democratic views and behaviors as well as the inability of the political parties. Birendra, however, could not prevent the Nepalese Civil War, a conflict between Maoist rebels and government forces, which lasted from 1996 until 2006.

== Assassination ==
On 1 June 2001, Birendra and his immediate family were massacred by his son, Crown Prince Dipendra, during a dinner event at the Narayanhiti Palace, the residence of the Nepali monarchy. After shooting himself, the comatose Dipendra was proclaimed King. He failed to regain consciousness and was declared dead a few days later. Birendra's younger brother Gyanendra was then made king.

== Notable works and improvements ==
=== Diplomatic campaign ===
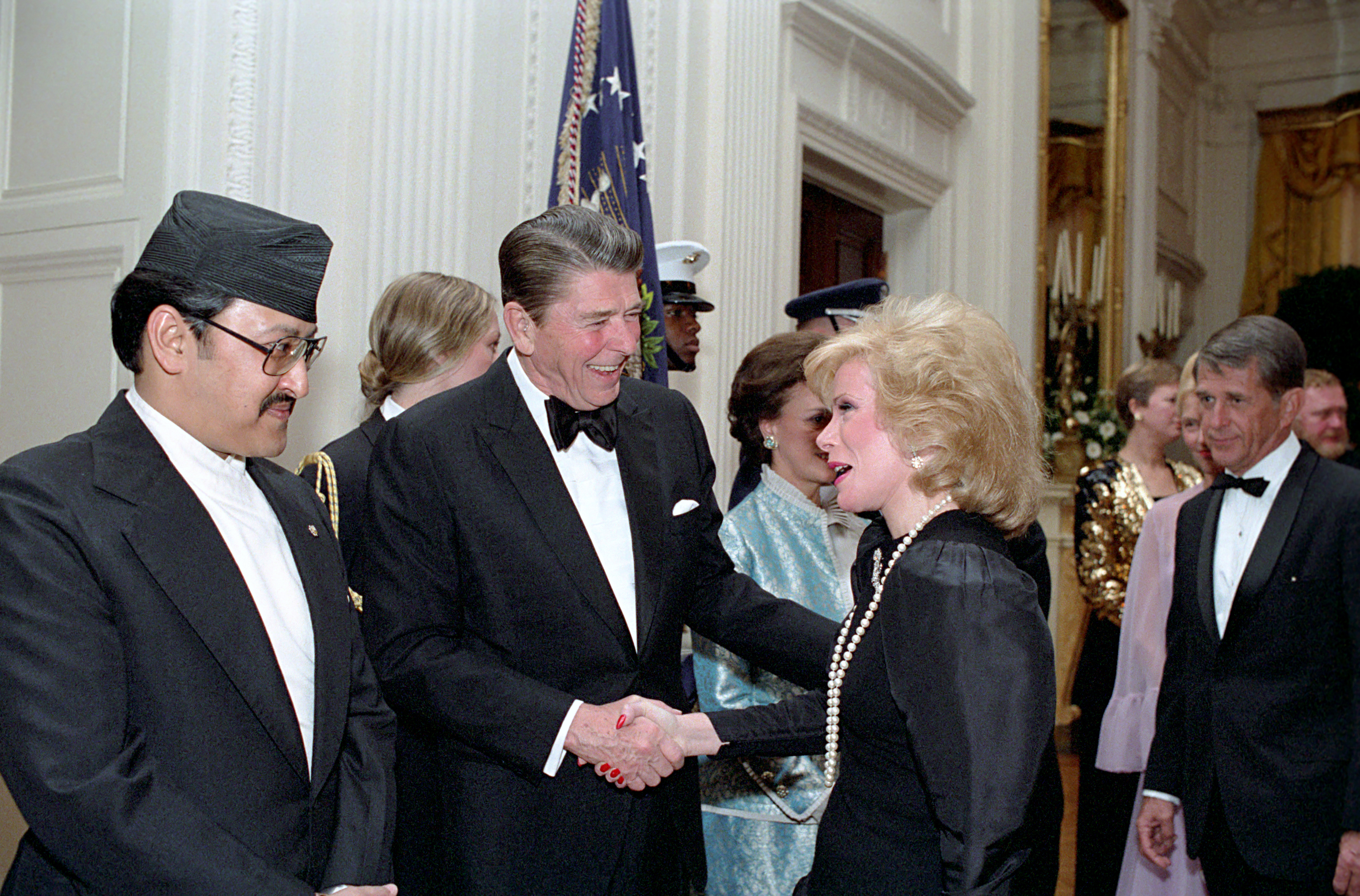
Birendra with US President Ronald Reagan, 1983

He managed to maintain Nepal's independence despite encroaching influences by India, China, and the Soviet Union. His first trips abroad as king were to India in October 1973 and China two months later. He prevented the breaking up of Mustang from Nepal and Tibet from China during the Mustang revolution. The disarmament of Khampas rebellions working against China brought Nepal-China relations to a new height. His compatriots remember him for his extensive campaign and contribution for the establishment of South Asian Association for Regional Cooperation and South Asian food reserve. During his reign, he was also able to set up the SAARC Secretariat in Kathmandu. He was able to establish diplomatic relations with additional 46 countries taking the total number of countries for diplomatic relations from 49 to 96. He further strengthened Nepal's policy of neutrality by promoting Nepal as zone of Peace in the UN. He believed that Nepal, sandwiched between the two Asian powers, should have good relationship with both.

=== Promotion of peace ===
He proposed Nepal to be declared a zone of Peace in the United Nations meeting, taking into consideration Nepal's historic peace status, birth of Gautam Buddha and its historical policy of Non-alignment to any foreign powers. This proposal was supported by 116 countries in the UNO. He later established a "Peace Keeping Training Camp" in 1986. This was later restructured into a training institute in 2001 for training peace keeping forces. It was later renamed as Birendra Peace Operations Training Centre. This institute, was later restructured as the training organization through which Nepal started sending trained, peace-keeping forces in cooperation with the UN and became an active member of it. In 1974, King Birendra was successful in peacefully disarming the Khampas rebellions, settled in the northern Himalayan region, by giving land, money and citizenship to those who surrendered their arms, and by confiscating weapons as well. Thus who did not surrender would be prohibited from moving toward the Tibetan region. Birendra is also credited with blocking the use of the army for suppressing the Maoist revolution in the country, which would've further aggravated the situation and disturbed the peace in the nation.

=== Environmental protection ===
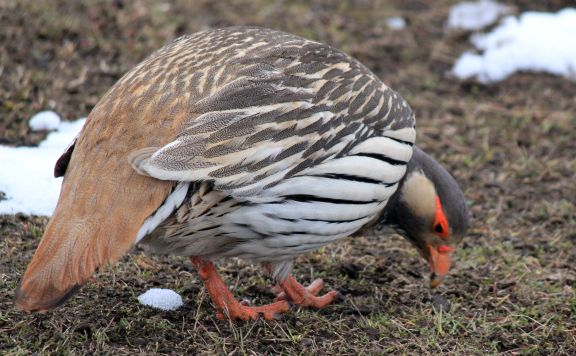
A Tibetan snowcock at Sagarmatha National Park

King Birendra was regarded as a lover of nature and a great supporter of nature conservation. The trend of nature conservation from the government started during his reign. The dramatic decline of the rhinoceros population due to massive Terai migration and the extent of poaching prompted the government to institute the Rhino Patrol force (Nepali: गैडा गस्ती ) of 130 armed men and a network of guard posts all over Chitwan. To prevent the extinction of rhinos through a legal system, National park law was introduced which gazetted the Chitwan National Park in December 1970, with borders delineated the following year and established in 1973.

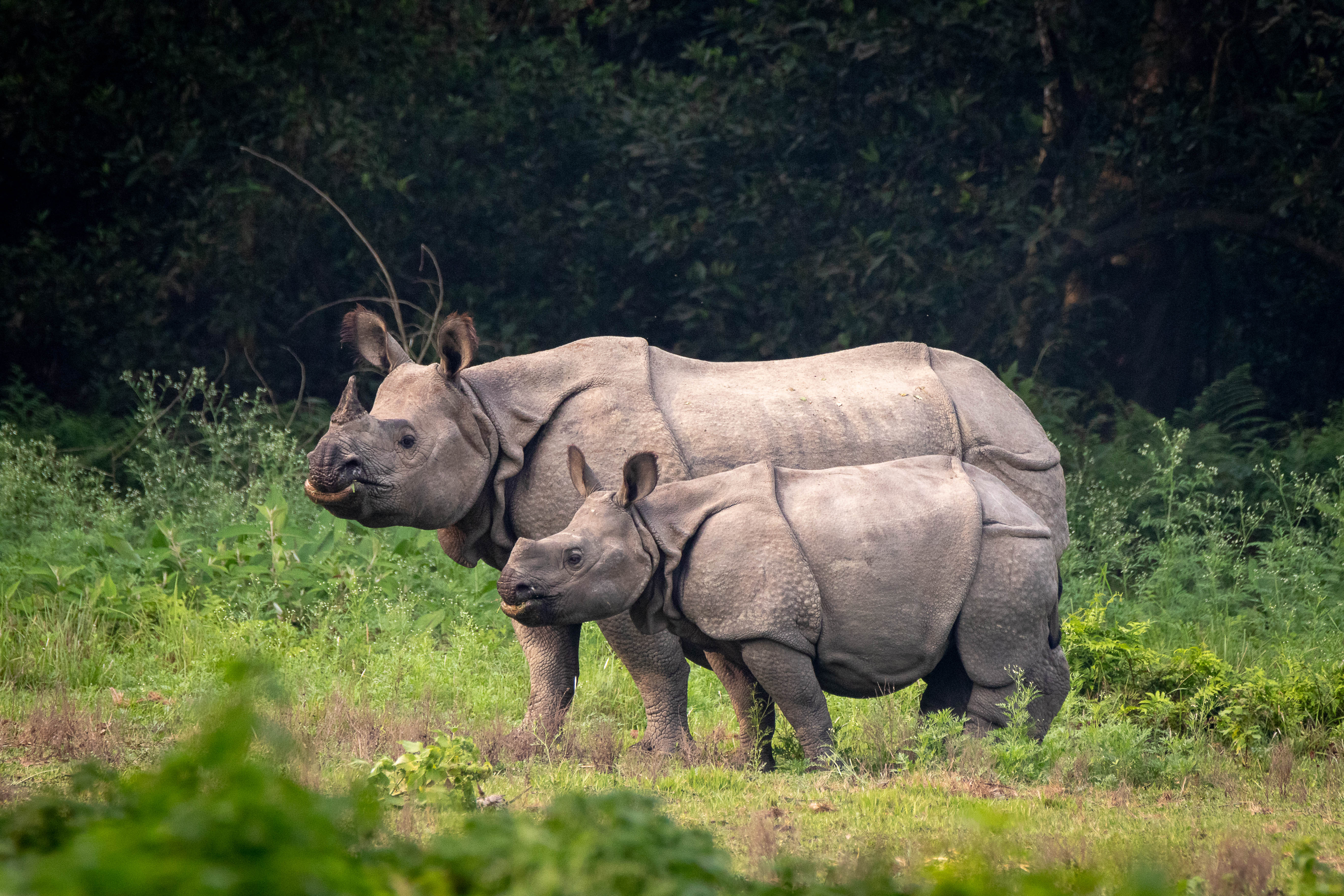
An Indian rhinoceros at Chitwan National Park

For the purpose of conservation of Tigers in the nation, an area of 368 km^{2} was gazetted as Royal Karnali Wildlife Reserve in 1976 which was later proclaimed as Royal Bardiya Wildlife Reserve in 1982. The Babai River Valley was further added to this reserved area in 1984. A flourishing ecosystem in the reserve later led to the proclamation of the area as national park in 1988. The country's fourth protected area was established in 1976 from the Himalayan area of Langtang and named as Langtang National Park. For this purpose, an area of 1,710 km^{2} was reserved in the district of Nuwakot, Rasuwa and Sindhulpalchok. He also gazetted another wildlife reserve in 1976 as Koshi Tappu Wildlife Reserve. In the same year, he also established Royal Shuklaphanta Wildlife Reserve in the Terai region of far-western province which was later enlarged and converted to national park in the late 1980s. Also, another protected area, Rara National Park was established in the same year in order to protect the unique flora and fauna of Humla, Mugu and Jumla regions and to fulfil his father, King Mahendra's dream of creating a pristine nature reserve with a reserved area of 106 km^{2} in the Mugu and Jumla districts which also includes the famous Rara Lake. The last National Park to be established as part of the Sacred Himalayan Landscape in the same year was Sagarmatha National Park in with reservation of area of 1,148 km^{2} in the Solukhumbu District.

In 1984, a 225 km^{2} area of Bajhang, Bajura, Achham and Doti was set aside as a protected area in the Far-Western Region, Nepal and was named Khaptad National Park. In the same year, he also established Parsa Wildlife Reserve which was later extended to a National Park. Similarly, the nation's only trans-Himalayan national park, Shey Phoksundo National Park, was established in 1984 with an area of 3,555 square Kilometers in the districts of Dolpa and Mugu in the Karnali Province which also included the famous Phoksundo Lake.

In order to preserve the royal tradition of hunting as a hobby, but also to prevent the depleting wild life resource he established Dhorpatan Hunting Reserve in 1987 AD. King Mahendra Trust for Nature Conservation as a memorial to his father, with the then prince Gyanendra as the chairman, was also established in 1990. With the establishment of Mahendra trust, he declared Annapurna Conservation Area.

Moreover, with his efforts, Nepal was able to enlist Sagarmatha National Park in 1979 and Chitwan National Park in 1984 into the UNESCO World heritage sites. Similarly, monument zones such as the Durbar squares of Kathmandu, Lalitpur and Bhaktapur and religious sites such as Swayambhunath, Boudhanath, Pashupatinath Temple and Changu Narayan was also enlisted in 1979.

=== Economic reforms ===
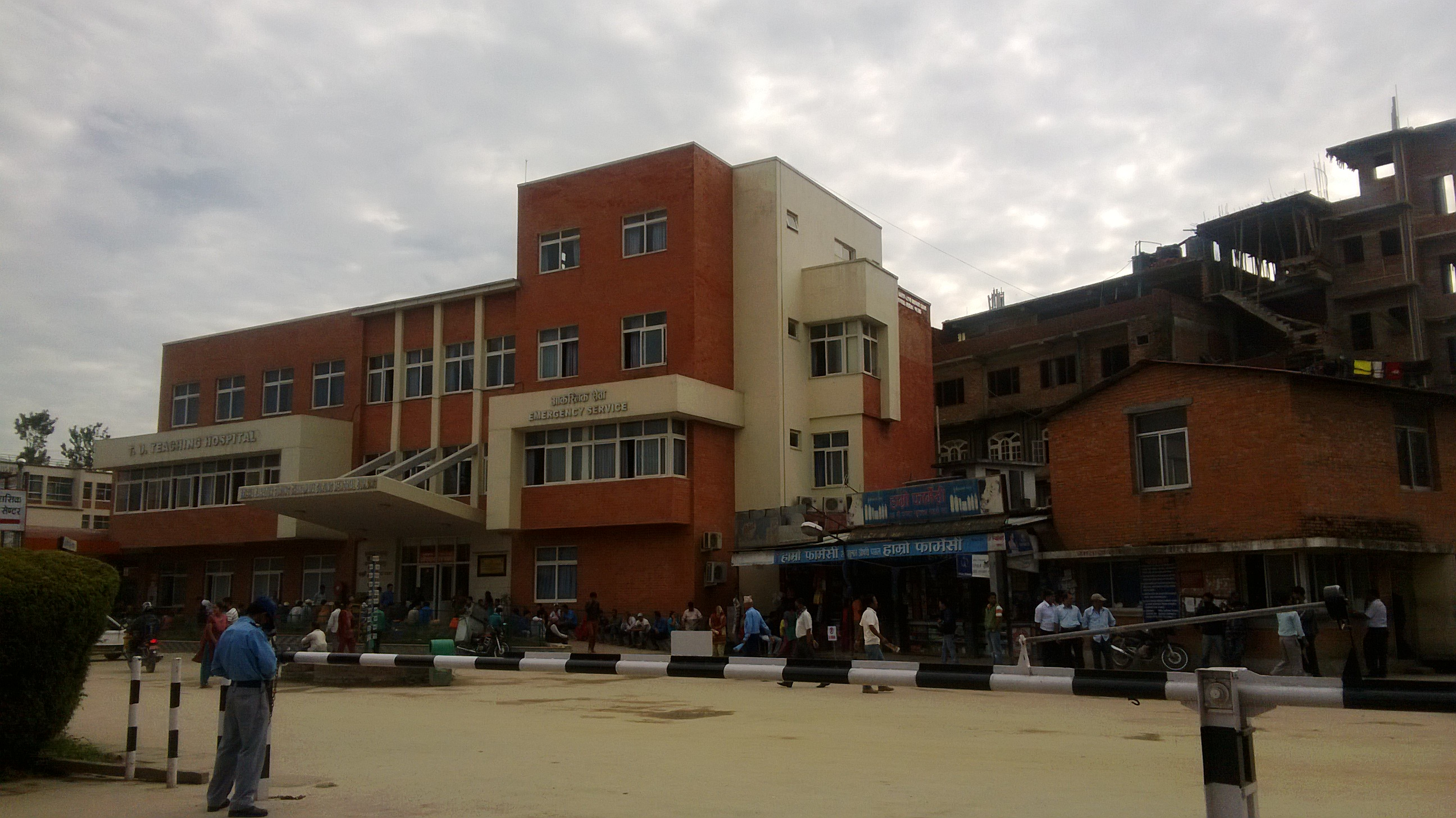
One of the blocks of Tribhuwan University Teaching Hospital, the oldest teaching hospital in Nepal.

Focusing on sustainability and environmental conservation, on 28 December 1975, trolley bus system was established in Nepal from the aid of People's Republic of China. He followed in the path of his father to establish industrial estates by establishing Nepalgunj Industrial Area(1973), Pokhara Industrial Area(1974), Butwal Industrial Area(1976), Bhaktapur Industrial Area(1979), Dhankuta Industrial Area(1980), Birendranagar Industrial Area(1981), Gajendranarayan Industrial Area(1986) respectively.

Birendra is initially credited for devising the plan of Melamchi water project to Kathmandu. Gorakhali Tires Industries, Udayapur Cement Industries Limited, Nepal Metal company, Nepal Pharmaceuticals were all established during his time. King Birendra, was the patron of Pashupati Area Development Trust. In April 1979, Nepal Oriental Magnesite factory was established with a joint investment of Nepal government and Orissa Industries, India at Lakuri Danda in Dolakha District with the objective of producing dead burnt magnesite and talc powder. In 1983 he was able to establish a Nepal-Pakistan Joint Economic Commission bringing in significant foreign investments in the country.

A 60 megawatt hydropower project at Kulekhani began operation in 1982 with economic aid from the World Bank, Kuwait, and Japan.

TU Teaching Hospital was established in 1982 with the economic support from Japan International Cooperation Agency. Nardevi Ayurvedic Hospital was established in 1974. Nepal Police Hospital was established by the king on the 27th of Chaitra, 2040 BS with an intention to provide free health services to in- service policemen and, their families.

He established Securities Exchange Center Ltd in 1976 to manage, promote and support the growth of trade of stocks and capitals in the nation. This center was later developed to what we know today as Nepal Stock Exchange.

He is also credited for establishing the first television channel of Nepal Nepal Television in 1984 which started its first channel in 1985 with French aid. Due to these economic reforms, by 1986, there were 2,054 industrial establishments employing about 125 thousand workers in the nation. By 1990, reach of people for television meant that video rental services and satellite dishes were commonly available.

King Birendra in the advice and consent of Rastriya Panchayat in 1986 established Mahendra Sanskrit University to manage Sanskrit education in Nepal in Dang which at the time of its commencement was the second university of the country.

=== Roads and transportation ===
Various Studies in 1972 showed that building road connectivity in hilly and rural areas were more expensive than air connectivity. So, the then government took the policy of connecting rural areas with airports and build roads only when there was a high amount of traffic flow. Under this policy, Baglung Airport (Balewa Airport), Dhorpatan Airport, Mahendranagar Airport and Rukum Chaurjahari Airport was established in the year 1973. Sanphebagar airport was established in 1975. Simikot Airport was established on 18 March 1977, Dolpa Airport, was established in 1978 and Ramechhap airport in 1979. Doti Airport, also known as Silgadhi Airport, was established in 1973 with the blacktopped runway. Talcha Airport, also known as Rara Airport, was built in 1975.Taplejung Airport located in Phungling, also called Suketar Airport, Jiri Airport and Phaplu Airport and Bajhang Airport was built in 1976. Rolpa Airport in 1980, Manang Airport in 1981, Bajura airport in 1984 and Darchula Airport in 1986.

Similarly, The Lamosangu-Jiri road leading to Solukhumbu was commissioned in 1985 with Swiss government aid.

=== Promotion of agriculture ===
The government, during Birendra's reign, focused highly on agriculture promotion. As a result, almost 90% of the population was directly or indirectly involved in agriculture by 1990. Bhrikuti Pulp and Paper was established in 1985 under the Companies Act 2021 (Bikram Sambat) with support from the People's Republic of China. Increase in agricultural lands and agricultural workforce provided increased supplies of food, resulting in better nutrition. Corn production was increased to over 1 million tons in 1991 from 500,000 tons in 1961. Lumbini Sugar Mills at Sunwal, Nawalparasi was built with the technical assistance from China in 1982. The establishment of Gorakhali rubber Industries led to the cultivation of rubber for the first time in Jhapa, Illam and many other places of eastern Nepal. Similarly. establishment of agriculture based industries such as Bhrikuti Pulp and Paper, Hetauda Textile and huge number of carpet and garment industry were established to convert raw agricultural produce which contributed greatly to the economy.

=== Political achievements ===
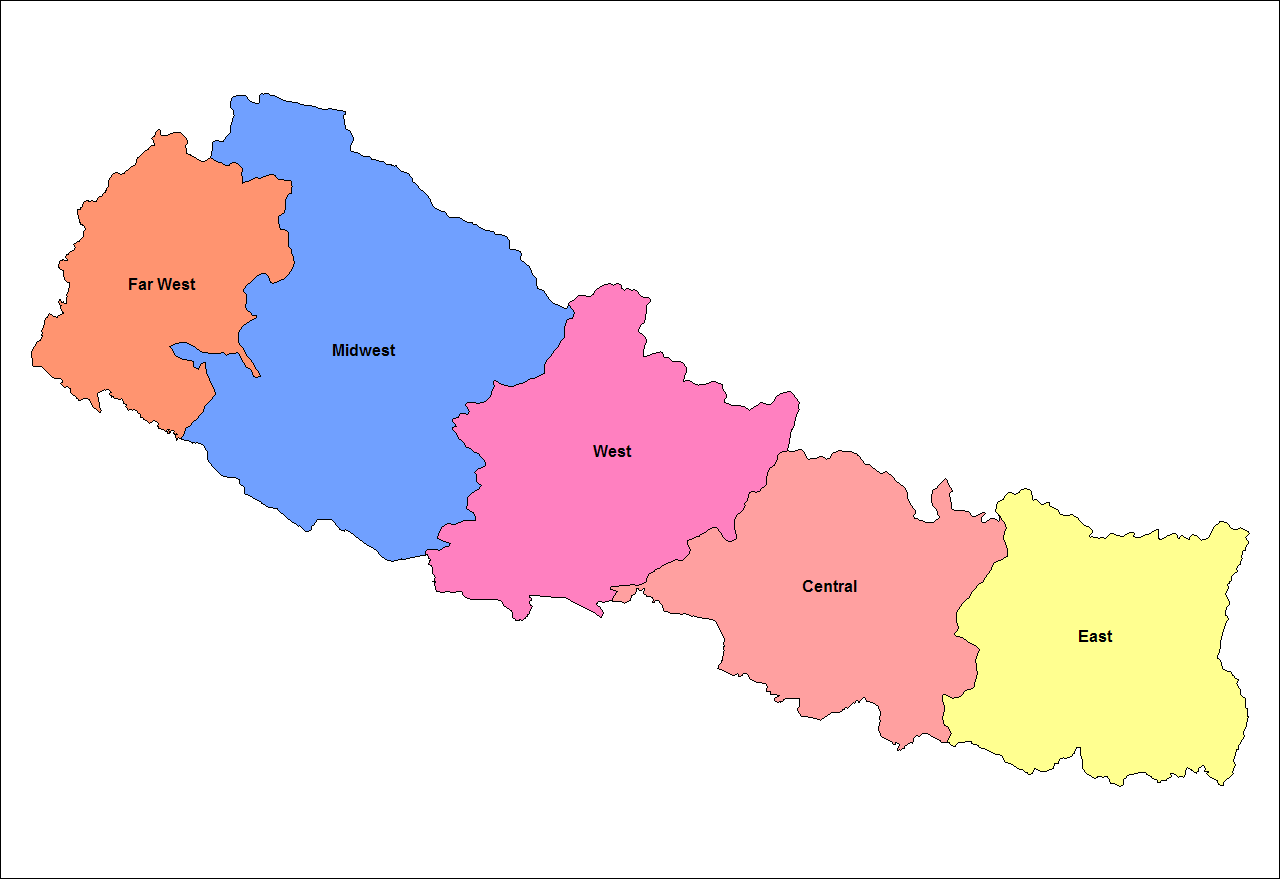
Administrative division of Nepal with 5 development regions

During the reign of King Birendra, referendum was held in 2037 BS for democracy wherein options were a multi-party system or a Panchayati system. During the Panchayat era and after the national referendum, he divided the nation into 5 development regions in order to create balanced development, and visited each division once a year; the visits were discontinued after 1990 democracy movement.

Despite previously being an autocratic rule and constant pressure from the supporters and royal members, the king always played the role of constitutional monarch by the book and never overstepped his boundaries. King Birendra was always there when there was some political crisis in the nation. Mid-term elections, 2051 and general election, 2056 can be attributed to his good governance. The King regularly asked the Supreme Court for its advice on any political matters that could concern the constitution so that he would never overstep the boundaries of the constitution. He created a culture where the king and prime minister would meet every Thursday at his palace to discuss matters of state.

=== Social reforms ===
Recognizing low literacy levels as the main hindrance to national progress, King Birendra made development of education system his national priority. The five-year plan starting from 1971 was mainly focused in building new educational institutions and upgrading the efficiency of the current education system. On the auspicious occasion of his coronation, King Birendra declared primary education to be free for all Nepalese citizens. Similarly, in 1978 with a royal approval all educational material started to be distributed free of costs to educational institutions. King Birendra became the patron of Royal Nepal Academy of Science and Technology which worked in the field of developing science and technology in the nation. He established Mahendra Sanskrit University in 1986 to preserve the language and culture in the region. Dowry system was criminalized in Nepal in 1976 under the Social Practices Reform Act (2033 B.S). Under the five-year plan, King Birendra started the policy of National Service which required the post-graduate students to contribute their one-year of service to the development works in the rural areas. He initiated the process of preserving the history by establishing Natural History Museum in 1975. On 22 September 1976 he enacted Narcotic Drugs (Control) Act, 2033 prohibiting the trade, smuggling or any kind of drug trafficking in the country.

=== Development policy ===
Birendra took the policy of road development according to the population and daily road traffic and connecting the rural areas with airports. He restructured many governmental organization for the purpose of achieving developmental goals. He stressed roadbuilding, sanitation and scientific as well as technical trainings. A comprehensive study performed regarding the central planning agency triggered the restructuring of the National Planning Commission in 1972 and minor changes in 1987. The government policy focused mainly on environment conservation, agriculture and education.

== Criticism ==
=== Stagnant economy ===
Though King Birendra is remembered as a development-friendly king, he is also criticized for his inability to drive the country towards rapid development efforts like his father King Mahendra. He had the political will but simply not the skill through which development efforts could be rapidly gained. His policy of sustainable development, shown by his nature conservation efforts, culture, and history became hindrances for economic development. The Panchayat regime created a stagnant economy during his reign as an autocratic ruler.

=== Administrative failure ===
Historians point out that the Panchayat Regime under King Birendra was a failure. He was not able to bring in much direct foreign investment during his reign, and all the programs he brought, or all the reforms he made were the continuation of his father's legacy. He restructured various organization previously established by his father, and implemented various development plan envisioned by his father.

=== Failed development efforts ===
Birendra restructured various organization and brought many development plans, but his development efforts were mostly a failure; which hindered any radical change in the country. Many airports and roads built during his era were rarely used, and eventually had to be closed down. Moreover, the reason the newly built roads were rarely used was due to very low vehicle ownership or access to vehicles; so rarely contributing to economic development.

=== Fall of the Panchayat system ===
Some historians and anti-egalitarians blame Birendra solely for the fall of the Panchayat regime. During the 1980s, the restraints that he had eased against political organizations provided a breeding ground for political parties which had previously been powerless and virtually non-existent until then.

== Personality ==
From a very young age, Birendra was described by his Eton teachers as a kind prince. He was remembered by his Eton classmates as a "very, very nice bloke who was embarrassed when his full title was read out at the school assembly." Noted Nepalese media personality Neer Shah described Birendra as kind and development loving king. Royalists around the king and various scholars define him as a simple king who was able to listen to others' views. They also criticized him for his weakness of not being able to deny the requests of people around him and his habit to act like a clerk and work himself rather than order others.

Birendra allowed the 2036 B.S. Janmat Sangraha (1980 Referendum) which was considered a move towards democracy. However, the leaders advocating for democracy and historians have claimed that the referendum was rigged. After the People's Movement I, he established a constitutional monarchy in Nepal.

Some historians have speculated that Birendra's democratic views and simple nature may have led to the success of the People's Movement I (1990). He is credited for introducing SAARC in Asia in order to strengthen the foreign relations of Nepal with the other South Asian countries.

== Health ==
Birendra was diagnosed with coronary artery disease. In November 1999, he suffered a mild heart attack and was admitted to the Cromwell Hospital in London, where he underwent angioplasty.

== Memorials ==
Many structures, institutions and honors have been named after King Birendra. Monuments erected in his name were renamed after the restoration of the parliament in 2006 and the end of the monarchy in 2008. After the political changes of 2006, an attempt was made to rename the highway built in the name of the king as Lok Marg.

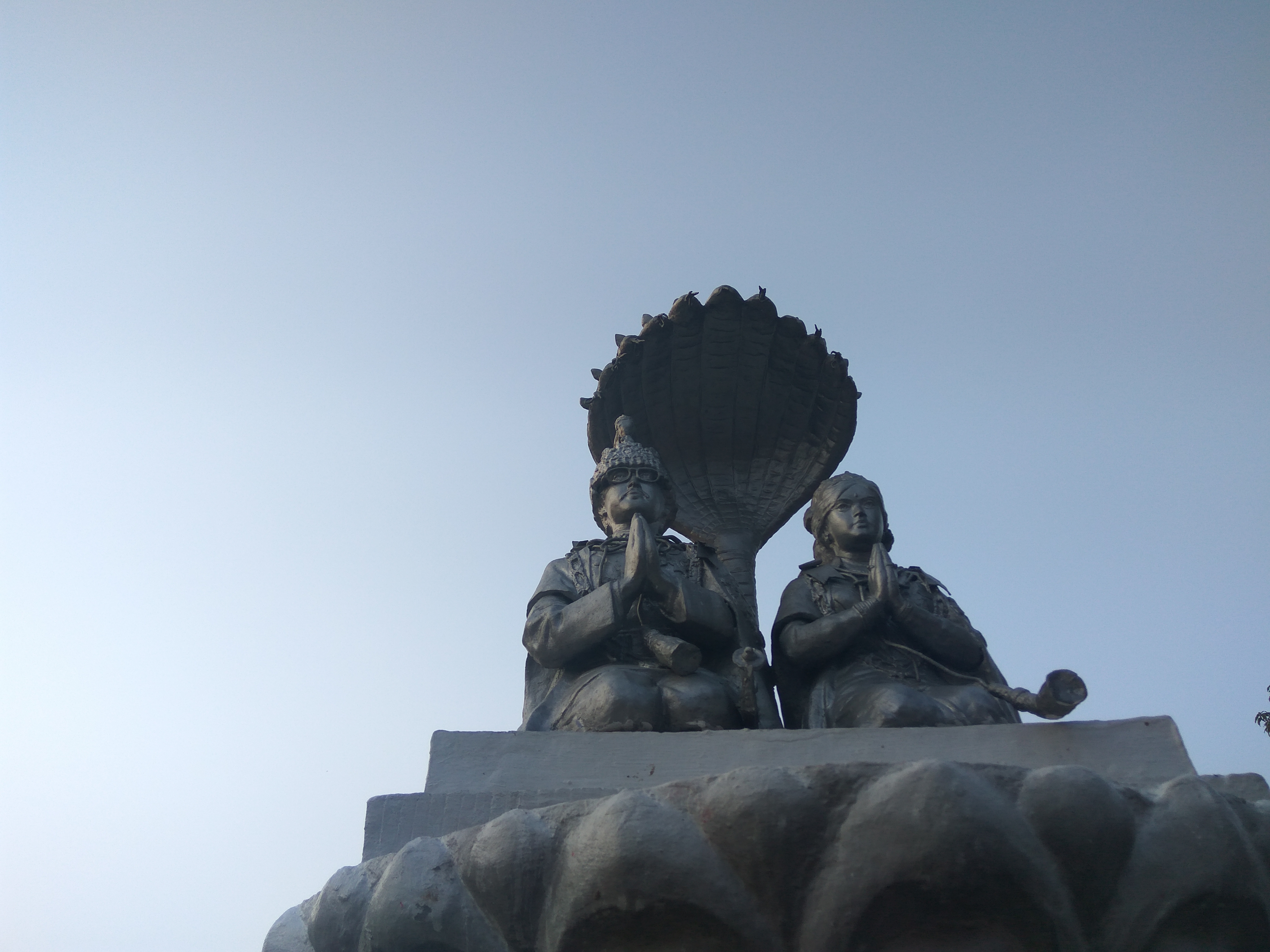
Statue of King Birendra and Queen Aishwarya

=== Statues ===
1. Dhamboji Chowk, (Nepalgunj)
2. (Dang)
3. Birendranagar (Surkhet)
4. Swargapuri (Shivapuri)
5. Jawalakhel (Lalitpur)
6. Bindhyabasini Temple (Pokhara)
7. Pashupatinath Temple (Kathmandu)

=== Schools ===
1. Shree Birendra Higher Secondary School, Bhadrapur, Jhapa
2. Shree Birendra Higher Secondary School, Charghare, Nuwakot
3. Shree Birendra Sarwajanik Higher Secondary School, Morang
4. Shree Birendra secondary school, Lakhantari, Morang
5. Shree Birendra secondary school, Belbari, Morang
6. Shree Birendra Madhyamik Bidhyalaya, Jhorahat, Morang
7. Birendra Secondary School, Katahari, Morang
8. Birendra Secondary School, Argakhanchi
9. Birendra Secondary School, Dasharathchanda, Baitadi
10. Birendra secondary school, Badikedar, Doti
11. Birendra Secondary School, Syangja
12. Birendra Secondary School, Nuwakot
13. Birendra Secondary School, Parbat
14. Birendra Sainik Awasiya Mahavidyalaya, Bhaktapur
15. Birendra jyoti Secondary School, Solukhumbu Sotang

=== Colleges ===
1. Birendara Bidhya Mandir Campus, Tikapur, Kailali
2. Birendra Multiple Campus, Bharatpur
3. Birendra Memorial College, Dharan
4. Birendra Multiple Campus

=== Locations ===
1. Birendranagar, Surkhet
2. Birendranagar, Chitwan
3. Birendra Chowk, (Birendranagar)
4. Birendra chowk, Kageshwari-Manohara Municipality
5. Birendra chowk, Phungling Municipality
6. Birendra Chowk, Dharan
7. Birendra Chowk, Tulsipur, (Dang)
8. Birendra Chowk, (Nepalgunj)
9. Birendra Chowk, (Itahari)
10. Birendra Chowk, (Beni, Myagdi)
11. Birendra Lake (Birendra Tal), Gorkha
12. Birendra Aishwarya Park, Dhangadi
13. Birendra Aishwarya Park, Baglung

=== Structures ===
1. Birendra Museum, Kathmandu Durbar Square
2. Birendra Army Hospital
3. Birendranagar Airport

=== Others ===
1. Birendra Beer, Zürich
2. Birendra Memorial Cup
3. Birendra Peace Operations Training Centre
4. Birendranagar Jaycees

== Honours ==
=== National Orders ===
- Most Glorious Mahendra Chain
- Sovereign of the Order of Nepal Pratap Bhaskara
- Sovereign of the Order of Ojaswi Rajanya
- Sovereign of the Order of Nepal Taradisha
- Sovereign of the Order of Tri Shakti Patta
- Sovereign of the Order of Gorkha Dakshina Bahu
- Recipient of the King Mahendra Investiture Medal

=== Foreign Orders ===
- Thailand: Knight of the Order of the Rajamitrabhorn (1986)
- Denmark: Knight of the Order of the Elephant, (17 October 1989)
- Japan: Knight Grand Cordon with Collar of the Order of the Chrysanthemum (1975)
- Cyprus: Grand Cross with Collar of the Order of Makarios III of Cyprus (1980)
- Kingdom of Laos: Knight Grand Cordon with Collar of the Order of the Million Elephants and the White Parasol (1970)
- Netherlands: Knight Grand Cross of the Order of the Gold Lion of the House of Nassau, (22 March 1975)
- France: Grand Cross of the Order of the Legion of Honour, (02/05/1983)
- Germany: Grand Cross Special Class of the Order of Merit of the Federal Republic of Germany (1986)
- Spain: Knight Grand Cross with Collar of the Order of Carlos III, (19 September 1983)
- Pakistan: Nishan-e-Pakistan (1983)
- Romania: Grand Cross of the Order of the Star of Romania (1975)
- Chile: Grand Cross with Collar of the Order of Merit of Chile (1989)
- Finland: Grand Cross with Collar of the Order of the White Rose (1988)
- Egypt: Collar of the Order of the Nile (1974)
- Yugoslavia: Great Star of the Order of the Yugoslav Star, (2 February 1974)
- Romania: Knight Grand Cross of the Order of 23 August (1987)
- United Kingdom: Recipient of the Royal Victorian Chain (23 February 1975)

=== Association honours ===
- Japan: Golden Pheasant Award of the Scout Association of Japan (1978)

== See also ==
- List of heads of state and government who were assassinated or executed
- List of state visits made by Birendra of Nepal
- Wedding of Birendra of Nepal and Aishwarya
- Coronation of Birendra of Nepal

Regnal titles
| Preceded by Mahendra | Crown Prince of Nepal; 1955–1972 | Succeeded by Dipendra |
| Preceded by Mahendra | King of Nepal; 1972–2001 | Succeeded by Dipendra |
