= Princess Shruti of Nepal =

Nepalese princess (1976–2001)

Shruti Rajya Lakshmi Devi Shah श्रुती राज्यलक्ष्मी देवी शाह
- Princess of Nepal
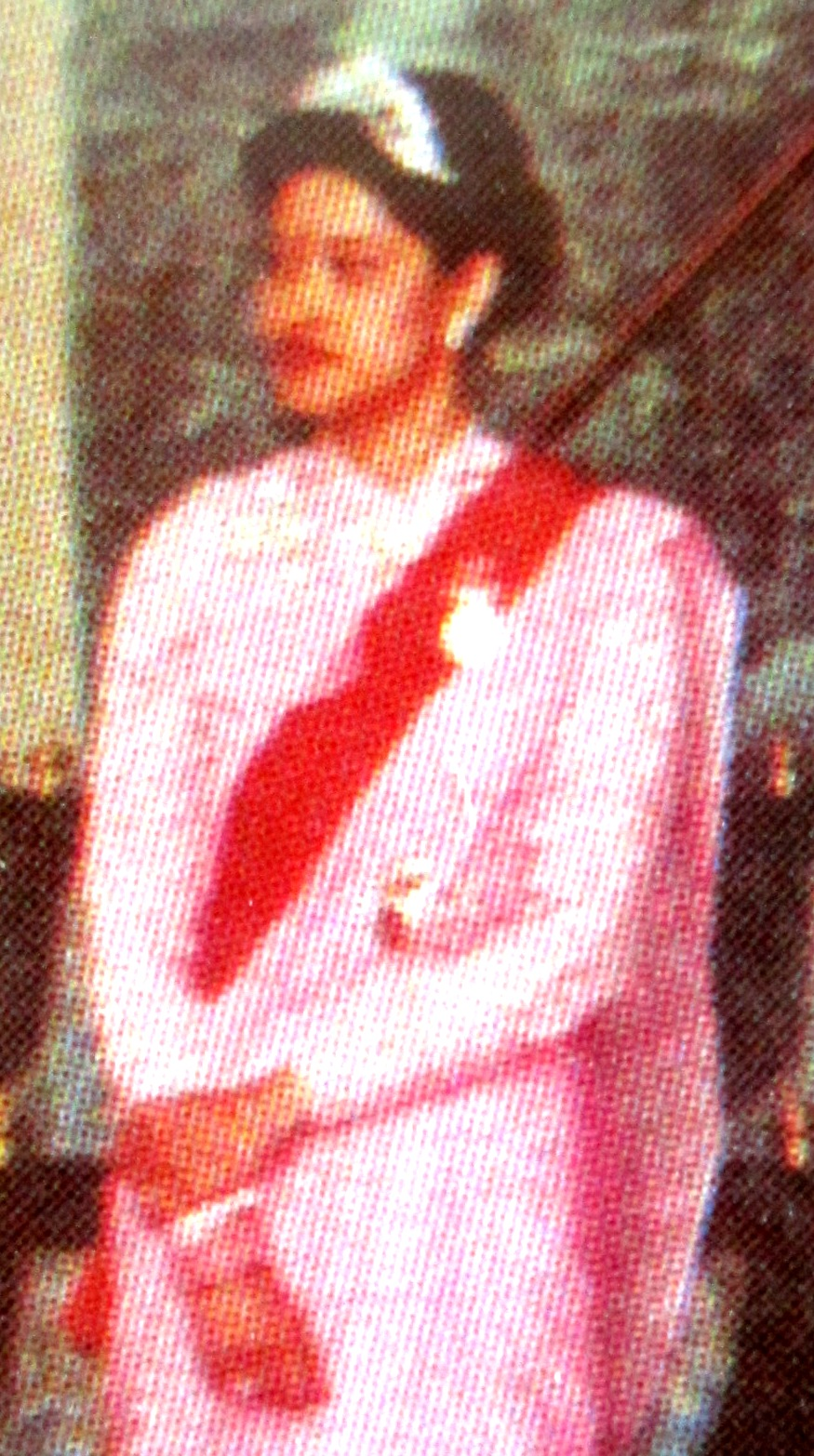
- Born: 16 October 1976; Narayanhiti Royal Palace, Kathmandu, Kingdom of Nepal
- Died: 1 June 2001 (aged 24); King Birendra Military Hospital, Chhauni, Kingdom of Nepal
- Cause of death: Assassination (gunshot wounds)
- Spouse: Kumar Gorakh Shumsher Jang Bahadur Rana (m. 1997)
- Issue: Girvana Rajya Lakshmi Rana; Surangana Rajya Lakshmi Rana
Names
- Shruti Rajya Lakshmi Devi Shah
- House: Shah dynasty (by birth); Rana dynasty (by marriage)
- Father: King Birendra
- Mother: Aishwarya Rajya Lakshmi Devi Shah
- Religion: Hinduism

Princess Shruti Rajya Lakshmi Devi Shah of Nepal (Nepali: श्रुती राज्य लक्ष्मी देवी शाह) (15 October 1976 – 1 June 2001) was the daughter of King Birendra and Queen Aishwarya, and sister of King Dipendra and Prince Nirajan. Princess Shruti was widely regarded by the public as a compassionate and approachable figure, earning her the affectionate nickname of 'the people's princess' in Nepal.

Princess Shruti of Nepal was known for her active engagement in social and humanitarian causes during her brief lifetime. As a member of the Nepalese royal family, she participated in various charitable activities, with a focus on education, children’s welfare, and women’s empowerment. She supported initiatives aimed at improving access to schooling for underprivileged children in rural Nepal and was involved in programs that promoted skill development and self-reliance among women. Passionate about Nepalese culture, Princess Shruti also contributed to the preservation of traditional arts and music. Her philanthropic work, though limited by her untimely death, is remembered as part of her enduring legacy.

== Education ==
Princess Shruti studied at Kanti Ishwari Sishu Vidhyalaya in Tripureswar, Nepal, St. Mary's School in Kathmandu, Nepal, and later at Mayo College Girls School in Ajmer, India. She completed her bachelor's degree at Padma Kanya Campus in Nepal.

She was a meritorious painter.

== Marriage and family ==
She was married to Kumar Gorakh Shumsher Jang Bahadur Rana, a member of the aristocratic Rana family of Nepal, descendants of Maharaja Chandra Shumsher Jang Bahadur Rana through the Field Marshal Sir Kaiser Shamsher Jang Bahadur Rana. He was head of Global Banking and Commercial Banking for Standard Chartered Bank Nepal Limited. Currently he is the first Nepali CEO of Standard Chartered Bank Nepal.

They married on 7 May 1997 in Kathmandu. They had two daughters:

- Girvani Rajya Lakshmi Rana (born on 22 June 1998 at Paropakar Maternity and Women's Hospital in Kathmandu).
- Surangana Rajya Lakshmi Rana (born on 21 October 2000 at Paropakar Maternity and Women's Hospital in Kathmandu).

On 5 December 2008 in Kathmandu, Kumar Gorakh Shumsher Jang Bahadur Rana married Deepti Chand, a humanities student at Kathmandu's Padma Kanya Multiple Campus, who is also the niece of former royalist prime minister Lokendra Bahadur Chand.

The name Shruti means "that which is heard".

== Death ==
Princess Shruti, her mother, father, and brother Nirajan, and six other Royal relatives were killed in the Nepalese royal massacre on 1 June 2001.

== Honours ==
National Honours

- Member First Class of the Order of Gorkha Dakshina Bahu (29/12/1995).
- Commemorative Silver Jubilee Medal of King Birendra (31/01/1997).
- Bisista Sewa Padak [Special Service Medal] (1999).

Foreign Honours

- France : Grand Officer of the Order of the Legion of Honour (20/09/1994).
- Germany : Dame Grand Cross Order of Merit of the Federal Republic of Germany (25/11/1996).
