= Dipendra of Nepal =

King of Nepal in 2001

Dipendra
- Shri Panch Maharajadhiraja
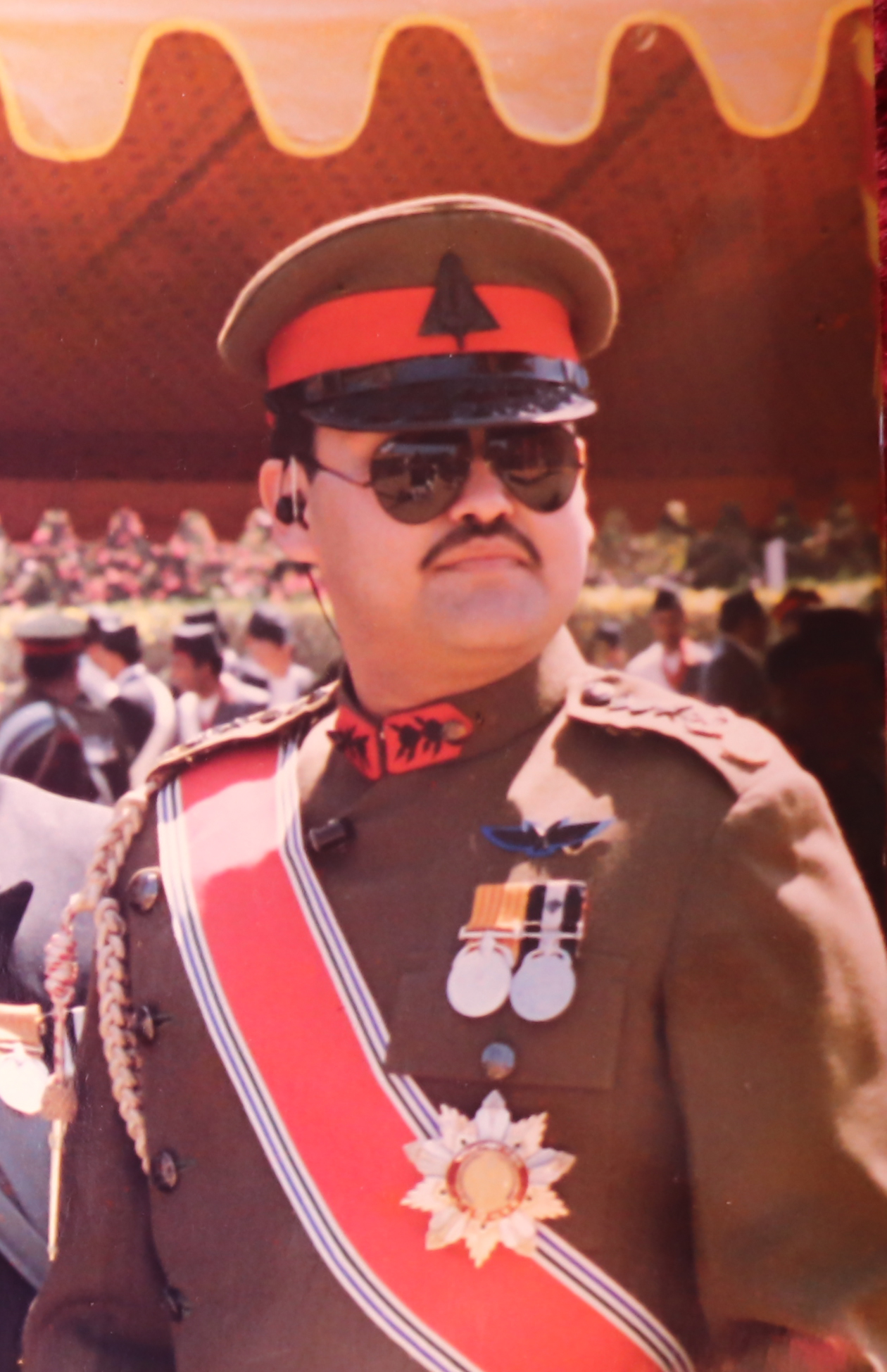
- Dipendra in 2001

King of Nepal
- Reign: 1 June – 4 June 2001
- Acclamation: 1 June 2001
- Predecessor: Birendra
- Successor: Gyanendra
- Regent: Prince Gyanendra
- Prime Minister: Girija Prasad Koirala
- Born: 27 June 1971; Narayanhiti Palace, Kingdom of Nepal
- Died: 4 June 2001 (aged 29); Kathmandu, Kingdom of Nepal
- Cause of death: Self-inflicted gunshot wound
Regnal name
- Nepali: श्री ५ महाराजाधिराज दीपेन्द्र वीर विक्रम शाह देव; Shri Panch Maharajadhiraja Dipendra Bir Bikram Shah Deva
- Dynasty: Shah
- Father: King Birendra
- Mother: Queen Aishwarya
- Religion: Hinduism

Dipendra Bir Bikram Shah Dev (Note: Nepali: दीपेन्द्र वीर विक्रम शाह देव) (27 June 1971 – 4 June 2001), was King of Nepal for three days, from 1 June 2001 to 4 June 2001. For the duration of his brief reign, he was in a coma after fatally shooting his parents King Birendra and Queen Aishwarya, other members of the royal family, and ultimately himself, in an event known as the Nepalese royal massacre. Upon Dipendra's death, his paternal uncle Gyanendra succeeded as king for his second reign.

== Early life ==
Dipendra was born on 27 June 1971 at the Narayanhiti Royal Palace as the eldest child of Birendra, the Crown Prince of Nepal, and Princess Aishwarya.

== Education ==
Dipendra received his early education from Kanti Ishwori High School, Kathmandu then went to Budhanilkantha School. Later, he attended Eton College in the United Kingdom. After Eton, he attended Tri Chandra College, which is affiliated with Tribhuvan University in Nepal and later joined the Nepalese Military Academy in Kharipati, Bhaktapur. He studied Geography at Tribhuvan University for his master's degree and was an all-Nepal topper with a gold medal, and a doctorate student at the same university. He received additional military training from the Academy of Royal Nepalese Gurkha Army, and pilot training from the Civil Aviation Authority of Nepal.

== Interests ==
Dipendra was interested in the fields of social services and sports. He attended various national and international sports ceremonies where Nepalese players participated. Dipendra became a karateka while studying in the United Kingdom and received a black belt at around the age of 20. He was a patron of the National Sports Council and the Nepal Scouts. Dipendra also wrote articles published in Nepalese periodicals, often on the motifs of nationhood and nationality.

In March 1993, during a visit to Nepal by Diana, Princess of Wales, he ordered police to close down the roads so that he could give her a late-night tour of Kathmandu in his sports car.

== Nepalese royal massacre ==
On 1 June 2001, Dipendra opened fire at a party being held inside a house on the grounds of the Narayanhiti Royal Palace, the residence of the Nepalese monarchy. He shot and killed his father, King Birendra; his mother, Queen Aishwarya; his younger brother, Prince Nirajan; his younger sister, Princess Shruti; his uncle, Prince Dhirendra; his aunts, Princess Shanti and Princess Sharada; his cousin, Princess Jayanti; and his uncle-in-law, Kumar Khadga Bikram Shah before shooting himself in the head. As his father was dead, he instantly succeeded him as King of Nepal while comatose from his self-inflicted head wound.

According to testimony to the official inquiry committee, the Crown Prince reportedly instructed his aide-de-camp Gajendra Bohara to fetch a cigarette containing hashish and an unidentified black substance, which was handed to Prince Paras. Committee testimony indicated that the Crown Prince had been preparing such cigarettes for about a year. The account was corroborated by other palace staff, including Ram Krishna KC, Gajendra Bohara and Raju Karki, who also testified before the committee.

His exact motives for killing his family remain unknown, but there are various theories. A leading theory is Dipendra wished to marry Devyani Rana, the daughter of an Indian princess, whom he had met in England. Due to her mother belonging to a distant culture and her father's controversial political alliances, Dipendra's parents objected, and said he would have to relinquish his right to succeed as king to marry her. Other theories allege that Dipendra was unhappy with the country's shift from an absolute to a constitutional monarchy, or that too much power had been given away following the 1990 People's Movement.

== Portrayals ==
- Upendra portrayed the crown prince in the 2002 Indian film Super Star, which was loosely based on the massacre.
- Indian actor Ashish Kapoor portrayed Dipendra in the third season of the documentary series Zero Hour, it showed a reconstruction of the massacre taken from surviving eyewitnesses.

== Honours ==
National honours

- Sovereign of the Order of Nepal Pratap Bhaskara
- Sovereign of the Order of Ojaswi Rajanya
- Sovereign of the Order of Nepal Taradisha
- Sovereign of the Order of Tri Shakti Patta
- Sovereign of the Order of Gorkha Dakshina Bahu
- Most Glorious Mahendra Chain
- King Birendra Investiture Medal (24 February 1975)
- Commemorative Silver Jubilee Medal of King Birendra (31 January 1997)
- Bisista Sewa Padak [Special Service Medal] (1999).

Foreign honours

- Denmark: Knight Grand Cross of the Order of the Dannebrog (17 October 1989)
- Germany: Knight Grand Cross Order of Merit of the Federal Republic of Germany (1997)
- Japan: Knight Grand Cordon of the Order of the Chrysanthemum (12 April 2001)

== See also ==
- List of shortest-reigning monarchs
- History of Nepal

== Notes ==
Dipendra of Nepal Shah dynasty Born: 27 June 1971 Died: 4 June 2001
Regnal titles
| Preceded by Birendra | King of Nepal; 1–4 June 2001 | Succeeded by Gyanendra |
Nepalese royalty
| Preceded by Birendra | Crown Prince of Nepal; 1972–2001 | Succeeded by Paras Bir Bikram Shah |
