= List of official overseas trips made by Birendra of Nepal =

This is list of state visits by King Birendra of Nepal (28 December 1945 – 1 June 2001) during his reign.

== Africa ==
=== Egypt ===
Birendra and his wife Aishwarya paid a state visit to Egypt at the invitation of President Anwar El Sadat in February 1981.

== America ==
=== United States ===
Birendra visited the USA between 10 and 13 December 1983. He also travelled to Orlando, Dallas, New York City, and Boston. In the same trip, he had a private visit to Atlanta, San Francisco, and Honolulu.

=== Cuba ===
In 1979, Birendra and Aishwarya made an official visit to Havana, Cuba to participate in the 6th Summit of the Non-Aligned Movement.

== Asia ==
=== China ===
In December 1973, a state visit to Peking was made. In March 2000, Birendra met Premier Zhu in China. The following year in 2001 Premier Zhu visited Nepal and met Birendra.

=== India ===
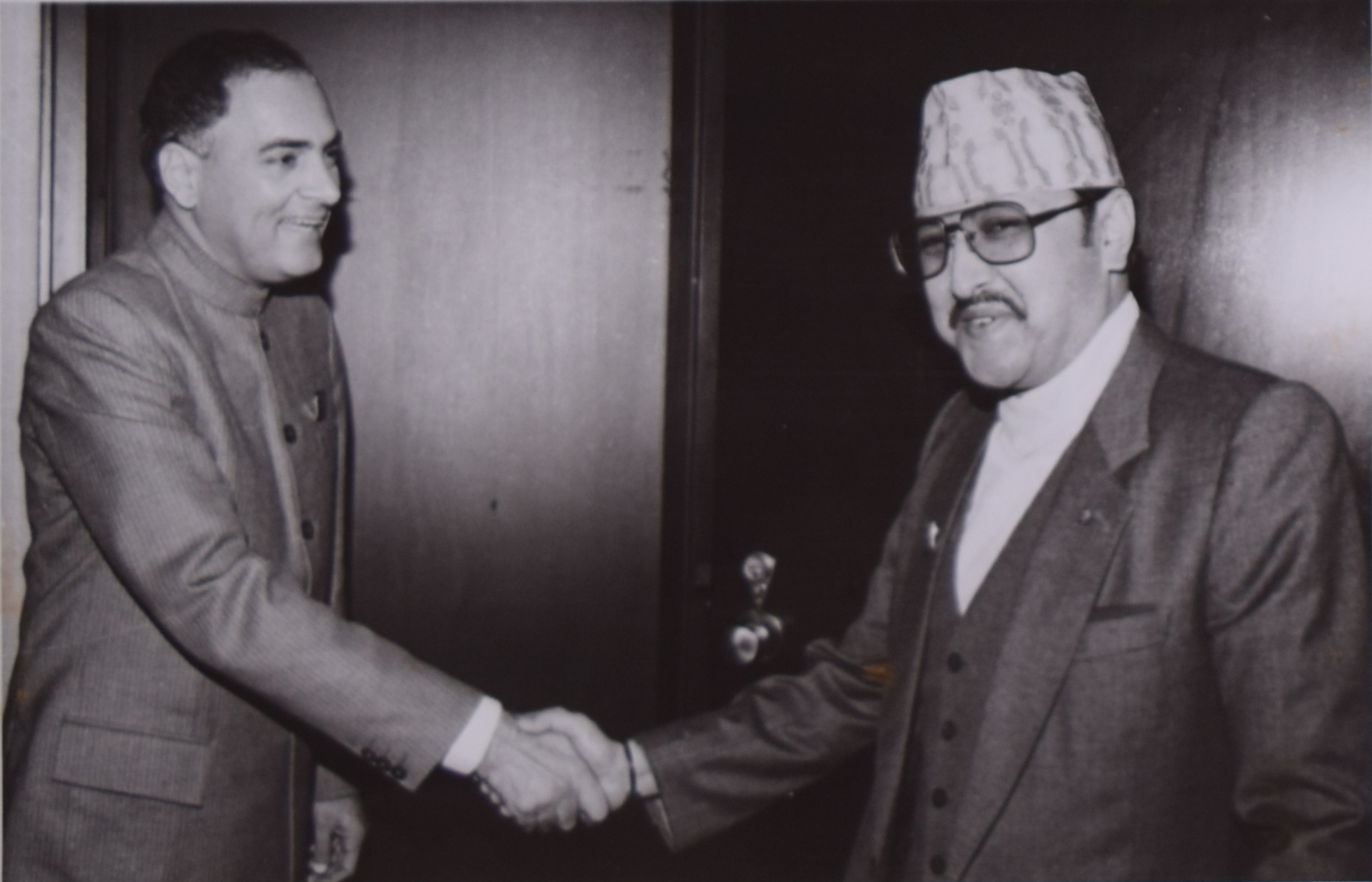
Birendra with Rajiv Gandhi

In 1977 Birendra met with Indian Prime Minister Morarji Desai, and other ministers. He also visited India in 1999.

=== Japan ===
In 1978, Birendra and Aishwarya went to Japan for a state visit.

=== Saudi Arabia ===
In 1999, Birendra and Aishwarya visited Saudi Arabia.

== Europe ==
=== United Kingdom ===
Birendra and Aishwarya had a state visit to the United Kingdom on 18–21 November 1980. The Queen of the United Kingdom organized and hosted a state banquet.

=== Denmark ===
In October 1989, Birendra and Aishwarya made a state visit to Denmark. While returning they made an unofficial visit to France.

=== Germany ===
In 1986, Birendra and Aishwarya made a state visit to Germany. They also went to Salzburg, Austria unofficially on the same trip. Between 25–30 November 1996, the German President Roman Herzog paid a state visit to Nepal on the invitation of Birendra.

=== Russia/USSR ===
In 1976, Birendra went on a state visit to USSR.

== Oceania ==
=== Australia ===
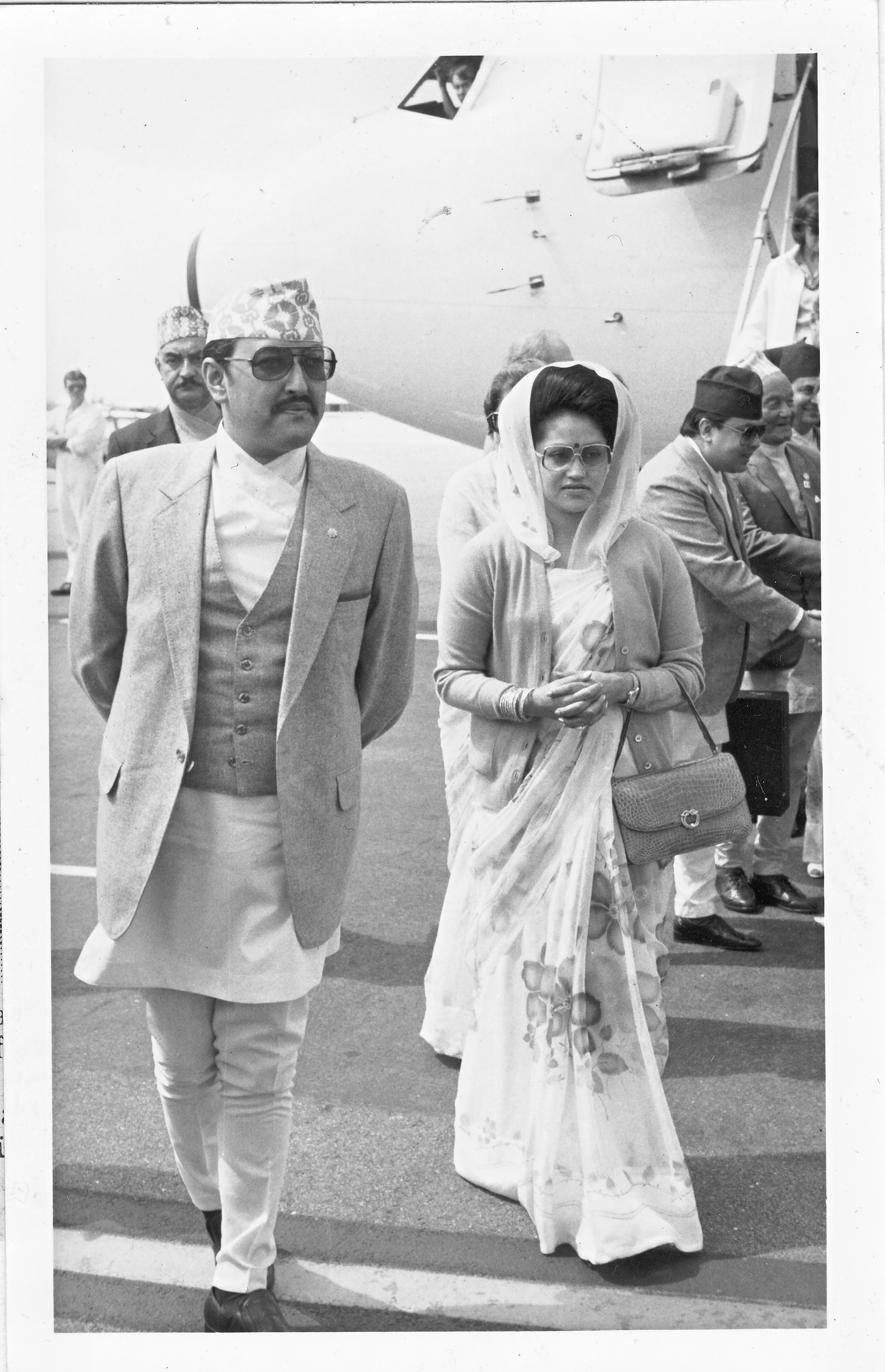
Birendra visiting Brisbane during his state visit to Australia in 1988

Birendra and Aishwarya made a state visit to Australia on 1–8 September 1985. They were invited by the Governor-General Sir Ninian Stephen and Lady Stephen.
