= Coronation of Birendra of Nepal =

1975 coronation in Nepal

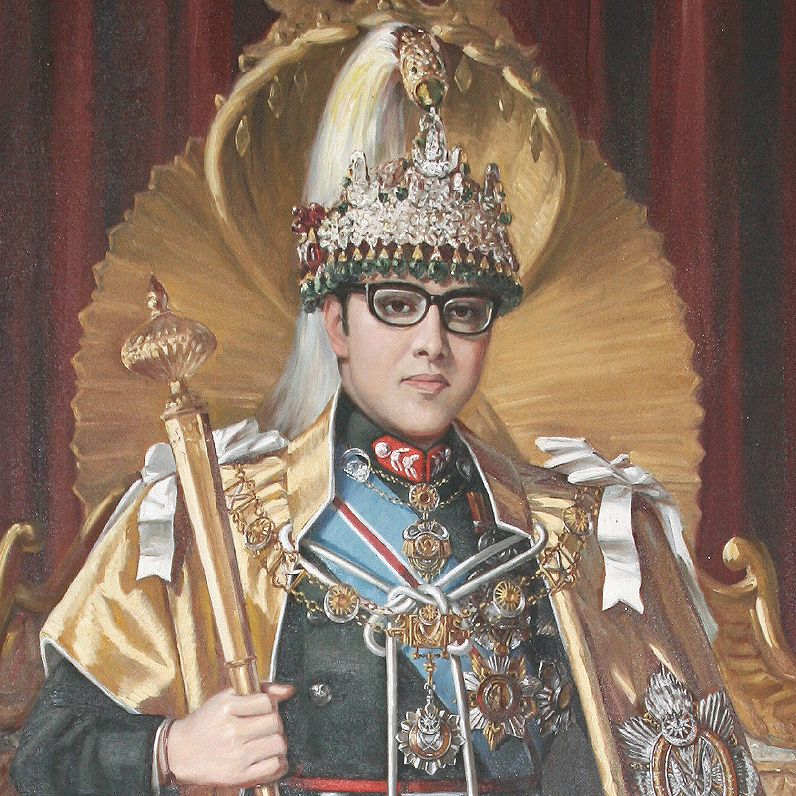
- King Birendra of Nepal

- Kathmandu (Nepal) Location of the Nepalese capital city of Kathmandu, where the coronation was held
- Date: 24 February 1975; 51 years ago
- Venue: Hanuman Dhoka, Kathmandu Durbar Square
- Location: Kingdom of Nepal; 27.71°N 85.32°E
- Type: Coronation
- Organised by: Government of Nepal
- Participants: King Birendra; Queen Aishwarya; Crown Prince Dipendra; Other participants and guests

Birendra was crowned as the tenth King of Nepal on 24 February 1975, at the age of 29. The coronation was held two years after the death of his father, King Mahendra because the first year was a year of mourning period and the next was considered inauspicious by court astrologers. Representatives from 60 nations attended the ceremony.

== Ceremony ==
The coronation was held in Hanuman Dhoka at Kathmandu Durbar Square. All the buildings and temples on main roads were whitewashed and restored. All the hippies and foreign tourists were taken out of the Durbar Square.

The coronation was done following Hindu rituals as the King is considered as an incarnation of Vishnu, one of the principal Hindu deities. Several key rituals were administered by priest privately to the King and Queen only.

In a day before coronation a ritual, called Purvanga was performed at Hanuman Dhoka. Birendra sat on a cloth mat in the courtyard. The ritual involved offering rice, barley and wheat to gods and ancestors while a group of Hindu priests chanted Vinayaka. Then the priests called for ancestral blessings by praying to the planets including Jupiter and Mars. During the prayer, Queen Aishwarya sat beside the King.

The next day, a parade of Nepalese military units, musical bands and bagpipes followed by a six horsed carriage, a gift from Queen Elizabeth II, carried the royal couple to Hanuman Dhoka. There, the King was smeared with mud from a dozen locations such as hills, rivers, farms and temples symbolizing that the new king is aware of his land. Then he ritually bathed with cow milk, yogurt, butter and honey. After cleaning, the king moved to sit in the golden throne while the priest chanted sacred Vedic mantras. The king bowed to the royal priest (Raj Guru). The Raj Guru then placed the royal crown on the head of Birendra at the auspicious moment of 8:37 am determined by the court astrologers. The king vowed “I shall tend to the growth of the country, regarding it as God himself. I shall remain alert and active for the sake of my country. I shall be my peoples’ beloved, like the raindrops.” in Sanskrit. cannon salvos were fired to indicate the ceremony had been conducted. Later in the day, king rode an elephant named Prem Prasad draped in velvet cloth, gold and silver and visited temples and places near the palace. Another 22 elephants followed the king carrying the guests. Citizens lined in road to see the king. Crown Prince Dipendra was wearing a military uniform.

== Notable guests ==
The guest included representatives from 60 nations. Some of them were:

- (United States) Philip W. Buchen, counsel of US President Ford
- (United States) Charles H. Percy, Senator from lillinois, US
- (United States) Carol C. Laise, Assistant Secretary of State for Public Affairs
- The Prince of Wales (representing the Queen of United Kingdom)
  - (United Kingdom) The Duke and Duchess of Gloucester
  - (United Kingdom) The Lord Mountbatten
- The Crown Prince Akihito and Crown Princess Michiko (representing the Emperor of Japan)
- Sir John Kerr, Governor General of Australia
- William Gopallawa, President of Sri Lanka
- Fazal Ilahi Chaudhry, President of Pakistan
- B. D. Jatti, Vice President of India
- Imelda Marcos, First Lady of the Philippines (representing the President of the Philippines)
- Prince Henrik of Denmark (representing Queen of Denmark)
- The Crown Prince of Laos (representing the King of Laos)
- The Prince Bhanubandhu Yugala (representing the King of Thailand)
- (Pahlavi Iran) The Prince Gholam Reza Pahlavi and Princess Manijeh Jahanbani (representing the Shah of Iran)
- The Tengku Ahmad Rithauddeen Ismail (representing the Sultan of Kelantan)
- The Princess Dechen Wangmo Wangchuck (representing the King of Bhutan)
- (Kingdom of Sikkim) The Chogyal of Sikkim
- (Upper Mustang) The King of Mustang (vassal of the King of Nepal)

=== Significances ===
The attendance of the Indian Vice President, B. D. Jatti, instead of the Indian President, Fakhruddin Ali Ahmed, was seen as a move against the protest in Nepal when India took over the Kingdom of Sikkim.

== See also ==
- Wedding of Birendra of Nepal and Aishwarya
