= Wedding of Birendra of Nepal and Aishwarya =

1970 royal wedding in Nepal

The wedding of Crown Prince of Nepal Birendra and Aishwarya was held on 27 February 1970 in the capital Kathmandu. The wedding was attended by more than 300 international guests. Around 50 heads of state were invited. The King of Laos, the President of India and the Governor-General of Ceylon attended the wedding while other countries sent their representatives. Crown Prince Birendra was aged 24 and Aishwarya was 20 at the time of the wedding.

== Wedding preparation ==
The wedding had an extensive preparation. Four white stallions were brought from England and flowers from the Netherlands. Exotic foods were brought from New Delhi in two planes including 130 Indian waiters and 40 taxi cabs. 200 automobiles were brought from Germany and Japan.

The Singha Durbar was cleaned to make room for the bride's family. The roads of Kathmandu were repaved and street lights were reinstalled. Government buildings were whitewashed and new walls were built for older constructions. Two new second‐class hotels were taken by government to serve the guests.

The hippies and the hashish market (then a legal business) were closed months before the wedding.

A postal stamp was issued to mark the occasion.

The cost of the wedding was about US$9.5-16 million (Nepal's annual national budget was 66 million at that time).

== Guests ==
Over 50 head of states were invited in the wedding. Attendees:

- The King of Laos
- The President of India
- The Governor General of Ceylon
- The Crown Prince and Crown Princess of Afghanistan
- The Chogyal and Gyalmo of Sikkim
- Prince Richard of Gloucester (a cousin of the Queen of the United Kingdom)
- David and Julie Eisenhower
- Ohio Senator William B. Saxbe, and his wife
- A. A. Fomin, head of the Southeast Asian department in the Soviet Foreign Ministry from Russia

== Wedding ==
The dates and times of all the wedding rituals were determined by Hindu astrologers. Hundreds of children and adults cavorted around the nine elephants to start the wedding procession. The wedding took place on 27 February 1970. Gifts were showcased in the streets. Some dignitaries walked to the palace. All Nepalese guests walked.

Two days of elaborate vedic rituals were performed prior. On the wedding day, Birendra mounted an elephant at the Royal Palace and led a two mile long procession. Upon reaching the courtyard of Singha Durbar, the prince performed ceremonies with the princess in front of an eternal flame. The couple's feet were washed by guests from the bride's side.

== See also ==
- Coronation of Birendra of Nepal
