= Samagaun =

Samagaun सामागाउँ
- Village development committee
- Location in Nepal Samagaun (Nepal)
- Coordinates: 28.64°N 84.61°E
- Country: Nepal
- Zone: Gandaki Zone
- District: Gorkha District

Population (1991)
  - Total: 665
- Time zone: UTC+5:45 (Nepal Time)

Samagaun is one of the most popular and densely populated village on the Manaslu Circuit Treak route. Till 2017 it used to be a village development committee and now it falls under Chumanuwri Rural Municipality lies in Gorkha District in the Gandaki Province of northern-central Nepal. The village is located at an altitude between 3530 m and 3800m, making it the highest-located large settlement in the Manaslu Mountain Area At the time of the 1991 Nepal census, it had a population of 665 and had 179 houses in the village. 100% of this population are followers of Buddhism.

== Popular Attractions ==
- Birendra Lake

Media related to Samagaun at Wikimedia Commons
