= Mahendra Chain =

Mahendra Chain महेन्द्र माला मानपदवी
- Type: Order
- Awarded for: Reigning foreign Sovereigns
- Presented by: Nepal
- Established: 26 February 1961
- First award: 1961
- Final award: 2001

Precedence
- Next (higher): None
- Equivalent: Birendra Chain
- Next (lower): Nepal Pratap Bhaskara

The Most Glorious Mahendra Chain (Nepali: महेन्द्र माला मानपदवी Mahendra Mala Manapadvi) is a royal decoration of Nepal.

== History ==
It was instituted on 26 February 1961 by the King Mahendra Bir Bikram Shah Dev.

== Grades ==
It is awarded in only one class, the Chain, to reigning sovereigns.

== Recipients ==
- Queen Elizabeth II of the United Kingdom
- King Birendra
- Queen Aishwarya
- King Gyanendra
- Queen Komal
