= Devyani Rana =

Nepalese princess (born 1971)

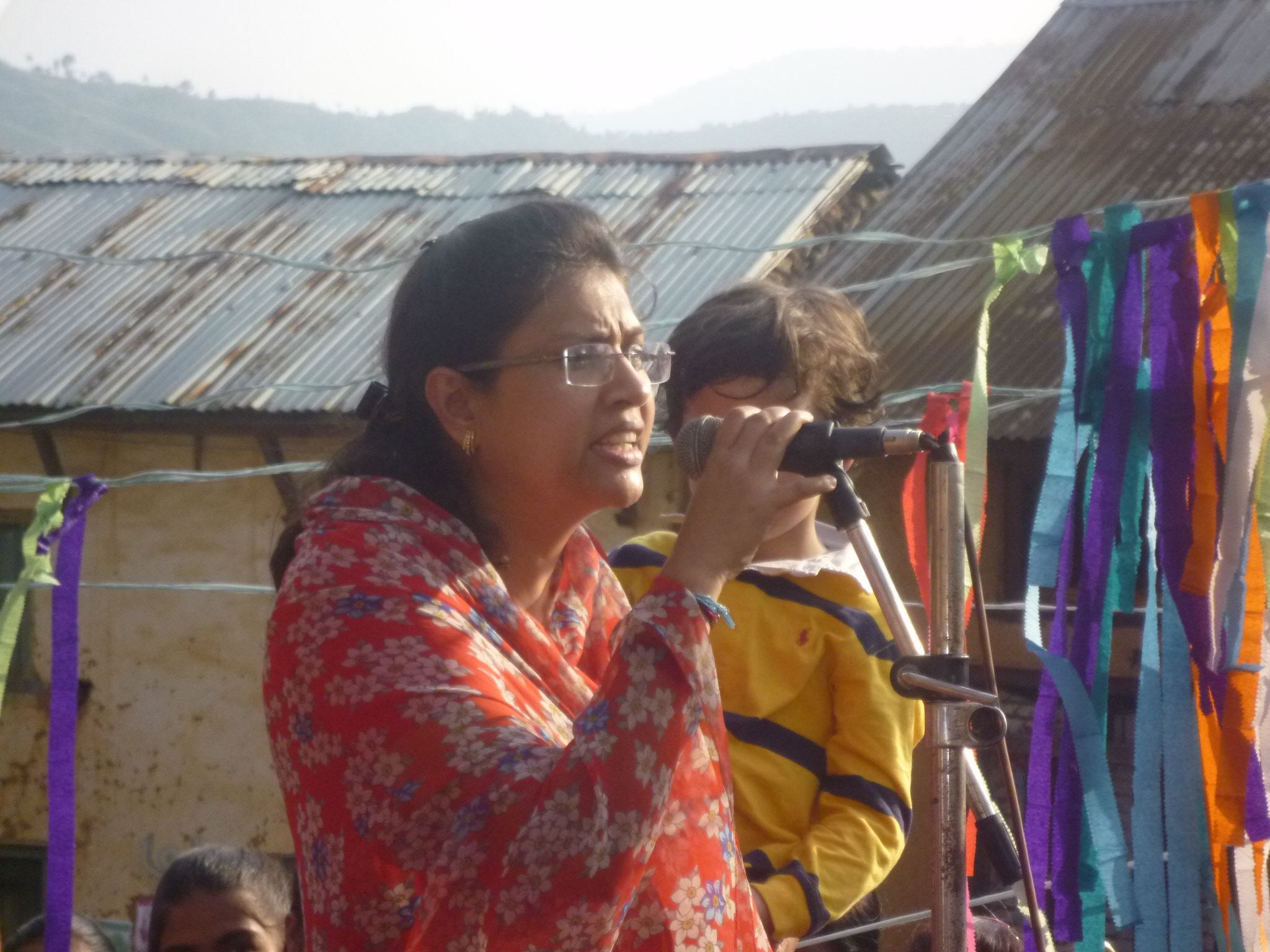
- Devyani Rana during the election campaign of her father, 2013
- Born: 1971 (age 54–55)
- Spouse: Aishwarya Singh (m. 2007)
- Issue: Adidev Singh
Names
- Devyani Rajya Lakshmi
- House: Rana dynasty
- Father: Pashupati Shamsher JB Rana
- Mother: Rani Usha Raje Scindia
- Religion: Hinduism

Devyani Rana is the second daughter of Pashupati Shamsher Jang Bahadur Rana and Rani Usha Raje Scindia, daughter of Jiwaji Rao Scindia, the last Maharaja of Gwalior, and the wife of Yuvaraj Aishwarya Singh, of the late Maharajas of Singrauli. News reports in 2001 suggested that the Crown Prince Dipendra of Nepal wanted to marry her, but his parents did not agree, and that the refusal was the reason he carried out the Nepalese royal massacre, although other reasons mentioned of political nature have been suggested as well.

== Early life ==
Through her father, Devyani was born as a member of the Rana dynasty. Her mother, Usha Raje Scindia, is the daughter of Jivajirao Scindia, Maharaja of Gwalior. She has one sibling, her older sister, Urvashi Khemka (née Urvashi Rajya Lakshmi).

Her paternal great-grandfather was Maharaja Mohan Shumsher JBR.

She attended Rishi Valley School in AP, Welham Girls' School, Dehradun, Ajmer; Lady Shri Ram College, Delhi, Kathmandu University (MA) and The London School of Economics (LSE) M.Sc. (Master’s degree in Science).

== Reports of Crown Prince Dipendra wanting to marry her ==
Dipendra was in the United Kingdom between 1987 and 1990, and his local guardian was Sir Jeremy Bagge, 7th Baronet, whose son was also at Eton. Bagge's daughter was a friend of Devyani who was also studying in Britain. Dipendra and Devyani met at the Bagges' Norfolk home, and Dipendra quickly fell in love with her and asked her to marry him. However, Dipendra's parents, and especially his mother Queen Aishwarya Rajya Lakshmi Devi Shah (born Rana), opposed the marriage.

According to an article in The New Yorker on 30 July 2001 and other published reports, the refusal of Dipendra's parents to consent to this marriage was the cause of the massacre of the royal family in Nepal. However, a 2009 report based on an interview with his cousin Paras Shah suggested that there may have been other reasons as well, with other theories alleging that Dipendra was unhappy with the country's shift from an absolute to a constitutional monarchy, and that too much power had been given away following the 1990 People's Movement. A book, Maile Dekheko Darbar, by the former Secretary to King Birendra suggests that Dipendra may have had significant personality problems.

== Post-massacre ==
Devyani Rana fled from India immediately after the royal massacre to escape media attention. In 2004, Rana obtained a second master's degree from the London School of Economics. She was reported to have been working for the United Nations Development Programme in India in 2012. In 2014, she became Government and Corporate Affairs Director for India and the Asian subcontinent at Caterpillar Inc., and in 2021 she moved to Coca-Cola India as Vice President, Public Affairs, Communications and Sustainability for India and Southwest Asia.

== Personal life ==
On 23 February 2007, Rana married Yuvaraj Aishwarya Singh, the son of Raja Bhuvaneshwar Prasad Singh and Rani Veena Singh of the erstwhile estate of Singrauli. Aishvarya is the grandson of former Indian Human Resources Minister Arjun Singh, a royal from the state of Churhat Thikana. The wedding took place at the Scindia Villa, New Delhi.

In 2017, it was reported that Rana had become an active member of the Rastriya Prajatantra Party-Nepal (RPP-N). Rana is currently serving as Vice President –Public Affairs, Communications and Sustainability Coca‑Cola India & South West Asia.

Rana has a son.

== Portrayals ==
- Keerthi Reddy portrayed Devyani Rana in the 2002 Indian film Super Star, which was loosely based on the 2001 royal massacre.
- Indian actress Pracchi Mehta Shah portrayed the role of Devyani Rana in the third season of the documentary series Zero Hour. It showed a reconstruction of the massacre based on accounts of surviving eyewitnesses.

== Ancestry ==
Ancestors of Devyani Rana

8. Mohan Shamsher Jang Bahadur Rana, Maharaja of Lamjung and Kaski
4. Bijaya Shamsher Jang Bahadur Rana, Maharajkumar of Lamjung and Kaski
9. Maharani Dikshya Kumari
2. Pashupati Shamsher Jang Bahadur Rana
10. Mian Mahendra Singh, of Suket
5. Sarala Kumari Rajya Lakshmi, Maharajkumari of Lamjung and Kaski
11. a daughter of Rana Trilok Singh of Mangal
1. Devyani Rana
12. Madho Rao Scindia, Maharaja of Gwalior
6. Jiwaji Rao Scindia, Maharaja of Gwalior
13. Maharani Gajrabai Raje Sahib Scindia
3. Rani Usha Raje Scindia
14. Thakur Mahendra Singh, of Kotla
7. Maharani Vijaya Raje Scindia
15. Chuda Devashwari Devi
