= Nepal Zone of Peace Proposition =

NEPAL-Zone of Peace (ZoP) (Nepali:नेपाल शान्तिक्षेत्र प्रस्ताव) was a proposition made by King Birendra during his coronation ceremony in 1975. King Birendra formally asked the international community to endorse his proposal that the United Nations should declare Nepal a ZoP, so as to give a new dimension to the Nepalese non-alignment.

"As it's one of the most ancient civilizations in Asia, our natural concern is to preserve our independence, a legacy handed down by history. We need peace for our security, independence and for development. And if today, peace is an overriding concern for us, it is only because our people genuinely desire peace in the country, in our region and elsewhere in the world. It is with this earnest desire to institutionalize peace that I stand to make a proposition—a proposition that my country, Nepal, be declared a Zone of Peace. As heirs to a country that has always lived in independence, we wish to see that our freedom and independence shall not be thwarted by the changing flux of time, when understanding is replaced by misunderstanding, when conciliation is replaced by belligerency and war."

The proposal has been endorsed by over 130 nations except India, but has stagnated with the fall of the Panchayat System in 1990.
