= Birendra Lake =

Lake in Nepal

- Birendra Taal (Nepali)
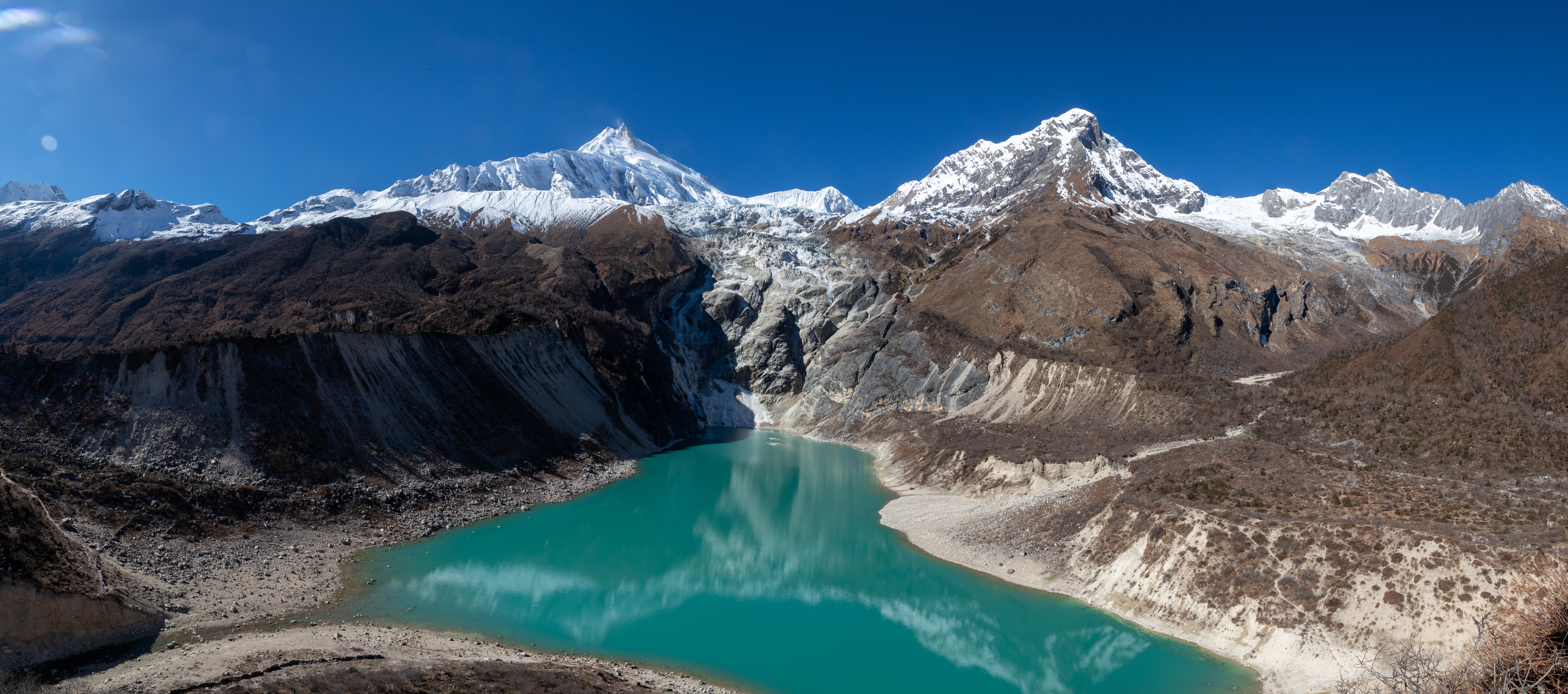

- Location within Gandaki Province Location within Nepal Location within Tibet
- Interactive map of Birendra Lake
- Location: Birendra Taal, Samagaun, Nepal
- Coordinates: 28°35′45″N 84°37′42″E
- Basin countries: Nepal
- Surface elevation: 3,691 metres (12,110 ft)

Birendra Lake (Birendra Tal), is a freshwater lake located in Manaslu Glacier in Gorkha District in northern-central Nepal at an elevation of approximately 4500m. The lake is named behind the Late King Birendra of Nepal. In 2024, an avalanche caused it to discharge a deluge of water over its banks.
