= Birendra Multiple Campus =

Campus of Tribhuvan University in Nepal

- वीरेन्द्र बहुमुखी क्याम्पस
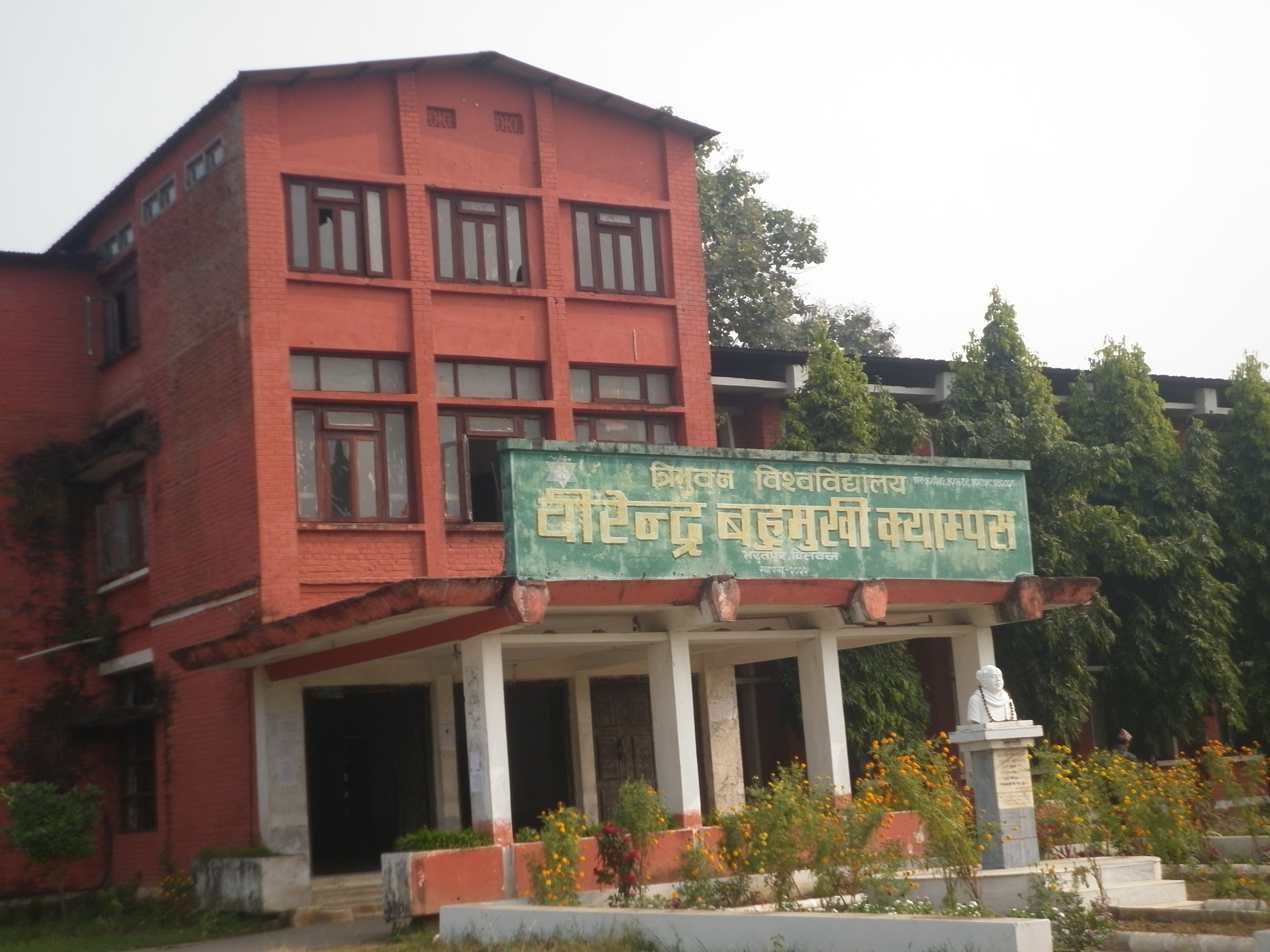
- Main campus office building
- Established: 2011 B.S.
- Parent institution: Tribhuwan University
- Location: Chitwan District
- Website: bimc.tu.edu.np

Birendra Multiple Campus (Nepali: वीरेन्द्र बहुमुखी क्याम्पस) is one of the constituent campuses of Tribhuvan University in Bharatpur, Chitwan district in Nepal. The campus was established in 1st Biashakh 2022 BS by Late King Mahendra Bir Bikram Shah Dev. The campus is named after King Birendra.

It offers courses in science, management, humanities and social sciences for Bachelor's and Masters's degree. All programs are filled with medium number of students. Campus has conducted 24 Bachelor's program and 8 Master's program. They recently added Microbiology and Geology course in Bachelors. A number of students are coming to study it. M.A. Sociology Anthropology and M.Sc. Chemistry are new programs in Masters. Campus Chief said "B.Ed. ICT will be also launch in nearly future." Campus is producing broachers to give information about its program.

== History ==
When the campus first started in 2022 BS, its name was Birendra Intermediate Arts College. The campus was founded due to growing population in Chitwan district after the district was opened for settlement in 2011 BS.

Initially, the college was run in the building of Chitwan High School with 14 students in night shift. In 2028 BS, it received 10 Bighas of land from Nepal government and in 2032 BS, the college was relocated to its own building. The campus was official inaugurated by King Birendra on 6th Marg, 2034 BS. The campus first offered Bachelor level education only. In 2040 BS, it started teaching Intermediate level and in 2050 BS, it added Masters courses.

== Infrastructure ==
The campus has an area of about 19 bighas and has various buildings.

There were 165 teaching staff in the campus in 2014.

== Educational Departments ==
There are 17 departments in Birendra Multiple Campus. It means the programs are divided into seventeen groups. Some of them are Nepali, History, Zoology, Geography Culture Ed, Economics, etc. Each department has a head to run it. Head of Education Department said "All departments are running smoothly." These departments are responsible for conducting all classes under them. According to Assistant Campus Chief, In History, Culture, Political Science and Geography department have fewer students.

== Notable events ==
- In 2076 BS, some student union set fire to the campus building. The perpetrators were arrested later.
