= Birendra Peace Operations Training Centre =

Birendra Peace Operations Training Centre (Nepali: वीरेन्द्र शान्ति कार्य तालिम केन्द्र) is an army training institute of Nepal operated by Nepali Army. The center is dedicated to train army personnel participating in UN Peace Keeping Operation. It is located at Panchkhal.

The facility was established as "Peace Keeping Training Camp" in 1986, which was subsequently restructured into a dedicated training centre in 2001. and renamed as Birendra Peace Operations Training Center.

The training centre was accredited by the UN Department of Peacekeeping Operations by Jean-Pierre Lacroix in 2018. The certification is valid for four years from 31 October 2018, to 30 October 2022.

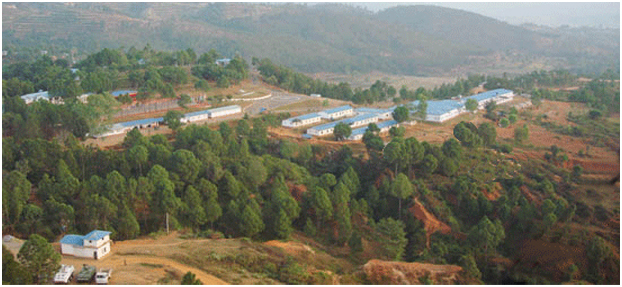
Nepal Army Birendra Peace Operations Training Centre

== Notable events ==
- In January 2000, an international multi platoon training exercise “Ex Shanti Prayas-I” was done in collaboration with US Pacific Command .
- In 2017, the training centre conducted joint training among various nation such as India or Pacific Command of the US Army (USPACOM).
