= Charghare =

Village in Nuwakot, Nepal

Charghare चारघरे
- Village
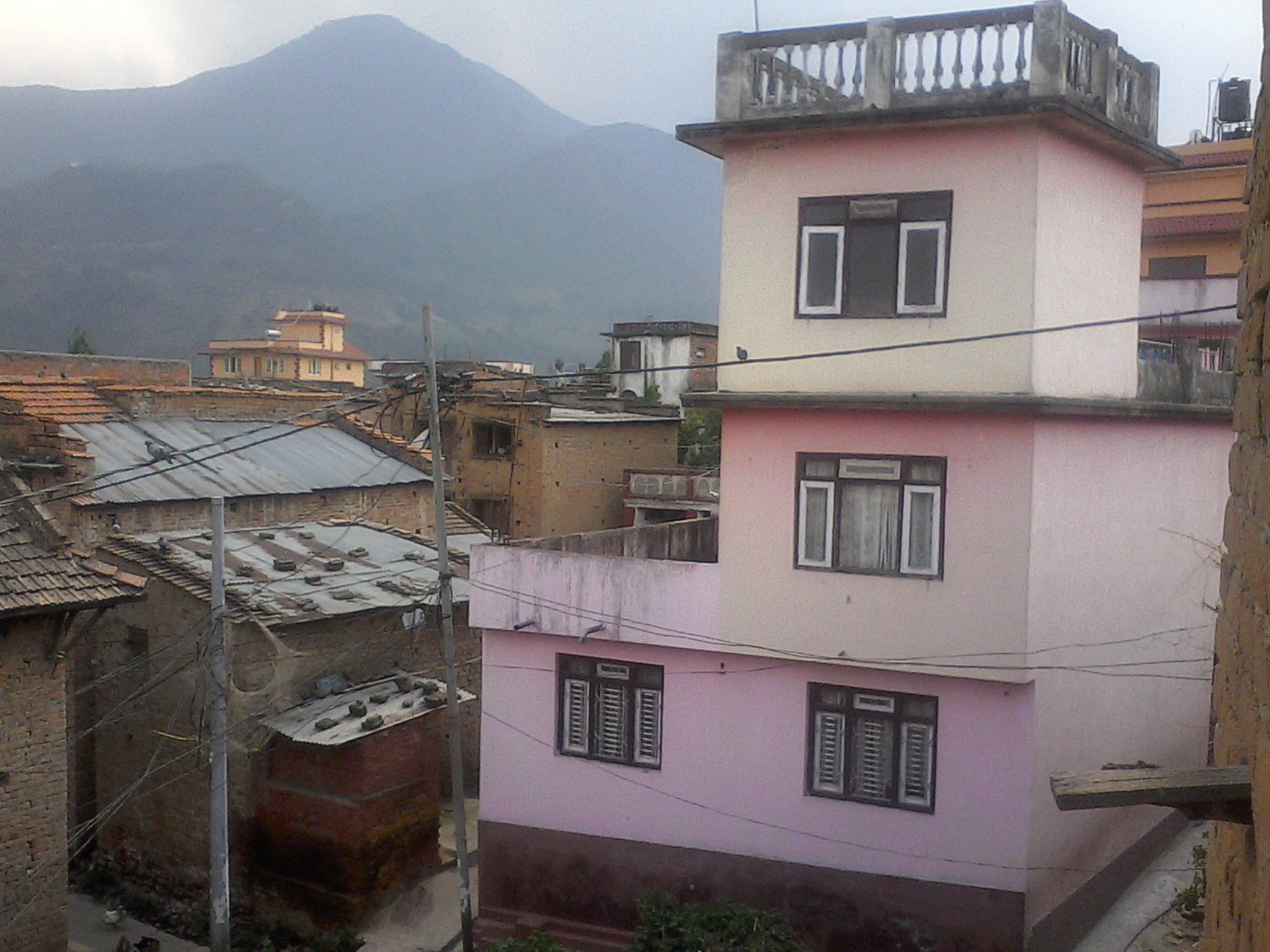
- A modern house and other houses
- Interactive map of Charghare
- Country: Nepal
- Province: Bagmati Province
- District: Nuwakot District

Area
  - Total: 4–5 km^{2} (1.5–1.9 sq mi)

Population (2011)
  - Total: 470

Charghare is a village situated in Nuwakot, Nepal. It is also a village development committee (VDC), and is surrounded by Bidur Nagarpaalika KalyanPur VDC, Gorysang VDC Khadkabhanjyang VDC. Charghare's main tourist places are Jalpadevi Temple and sloping land (पाखा). It covers an area of approximately 4 or 5 km^{2}. Around 90 houses are found here. The population of this village is about 470.

Charghare VDC consists of Chainpur Village, Munthala, Mulabari, Panthagaun, Gauribeshi, Bhaduwar.

Houses are of traditional type but new houses are constructed in a modern style.

Most people are engaged in agriculture and trade.

== History ==
No accurate information or documents have been found on the origin of the village. When the village was established is still unknown. It is believed that the village originated during the period of the Unification Campaign by King Prithvi Narayan Shah. The King's main aim was to capture the Kathmandu Valley, but to win Kathmandu Valley over he had to defeat the Kirtipur Valley. He brought a large number of troops from the west to attack the Kirtipur Valley. However, he failed twice to take over city. After a heavy loss of troops and his 'right-hand' Kalu Pandey, he started to conquer the small states around Kirtipur to impose an economic strike. During those days Charghare was unnamed and open plain land. Some people migrated or may be troops who has come for battle form western part who started to settlement with the four houses (चार घर) in village. Later pronounced of Char ghar (चार घर) changed into Charghare (चारघरे) which consequenced the name of village as Charghare. This assumption of data about the origin of the village and may be fallacious or wrong because data are not based on primary and secondary sources.

It is supposed that the name and village were developed in the 19th century but this place has a historical story which is more than a thousand years old. Name of this place was mentioned in Swasthanibratha katha as Jalpadevi, Jalandhar. According to the religious history of the temple here, Sati Devi's lower chin fell in this place.

== Gallery ==
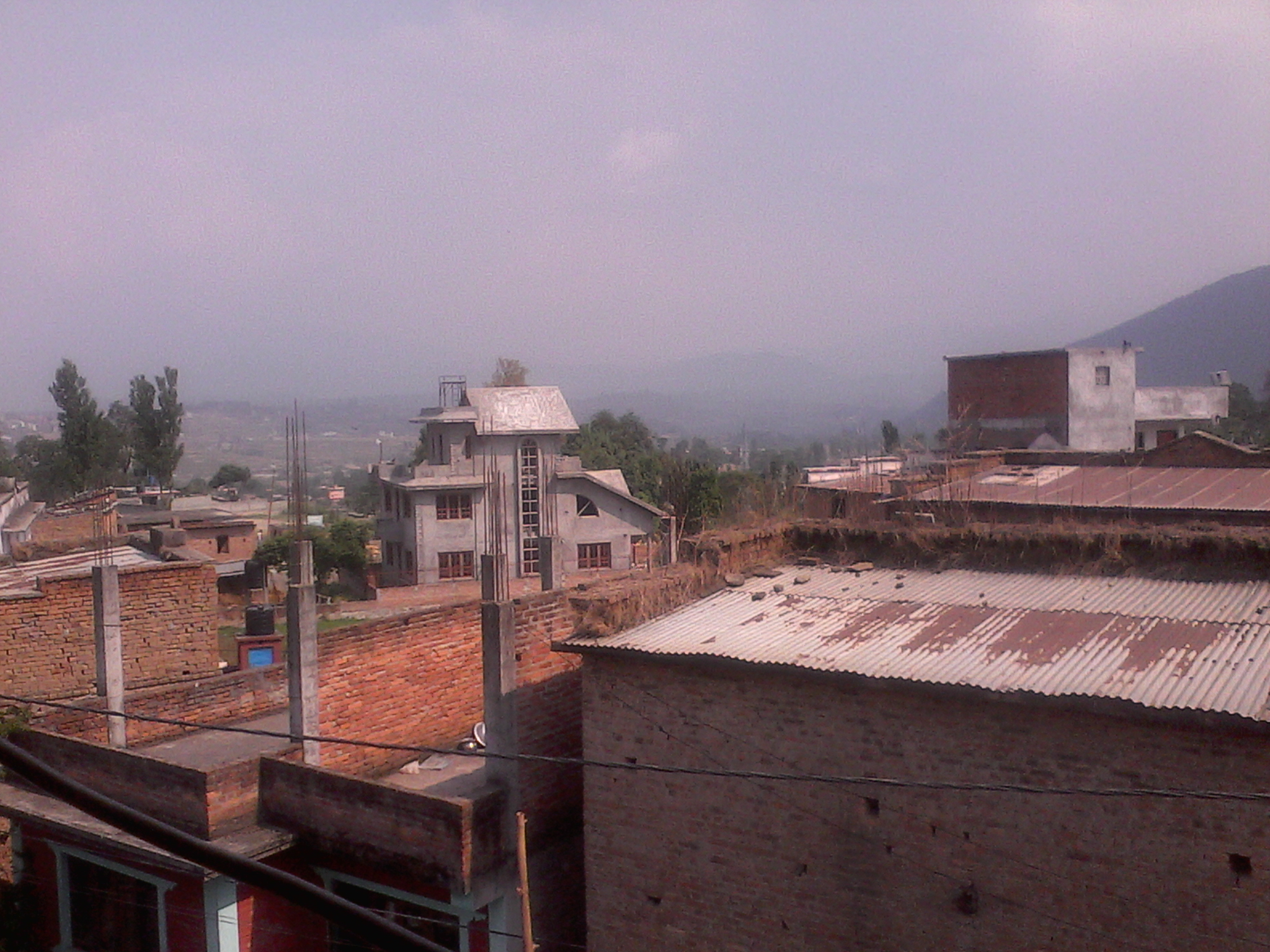
Some of the modern houses of Charghare (left) and a traditional house (right)

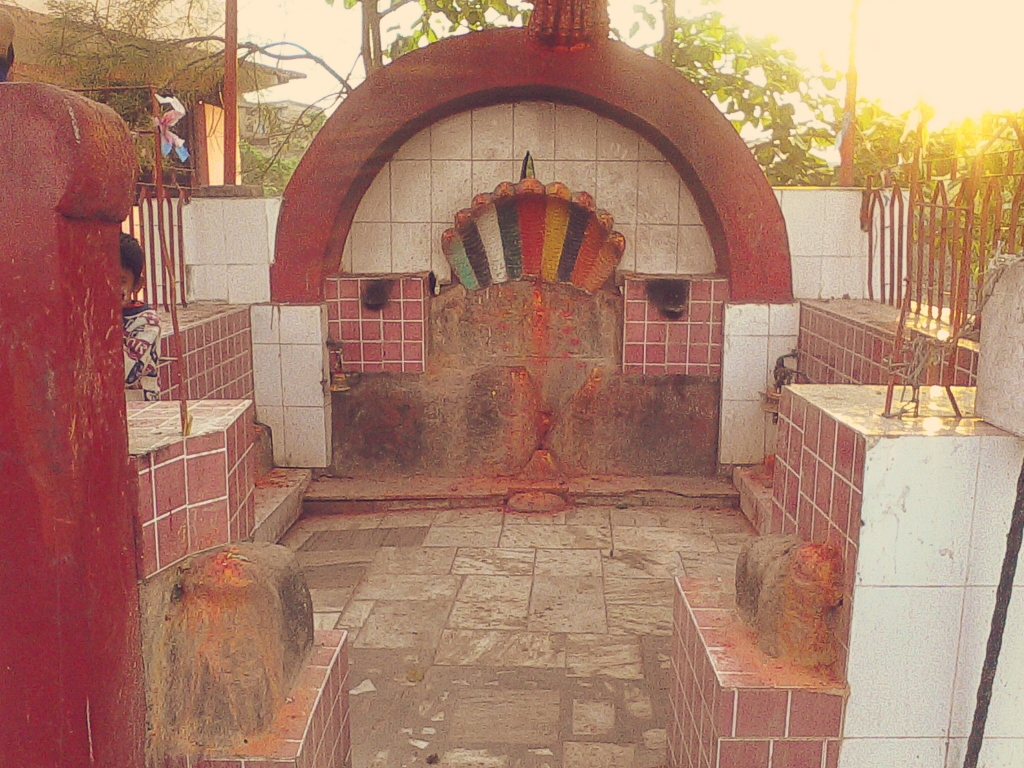
Jalpadevi Temple of Charghare

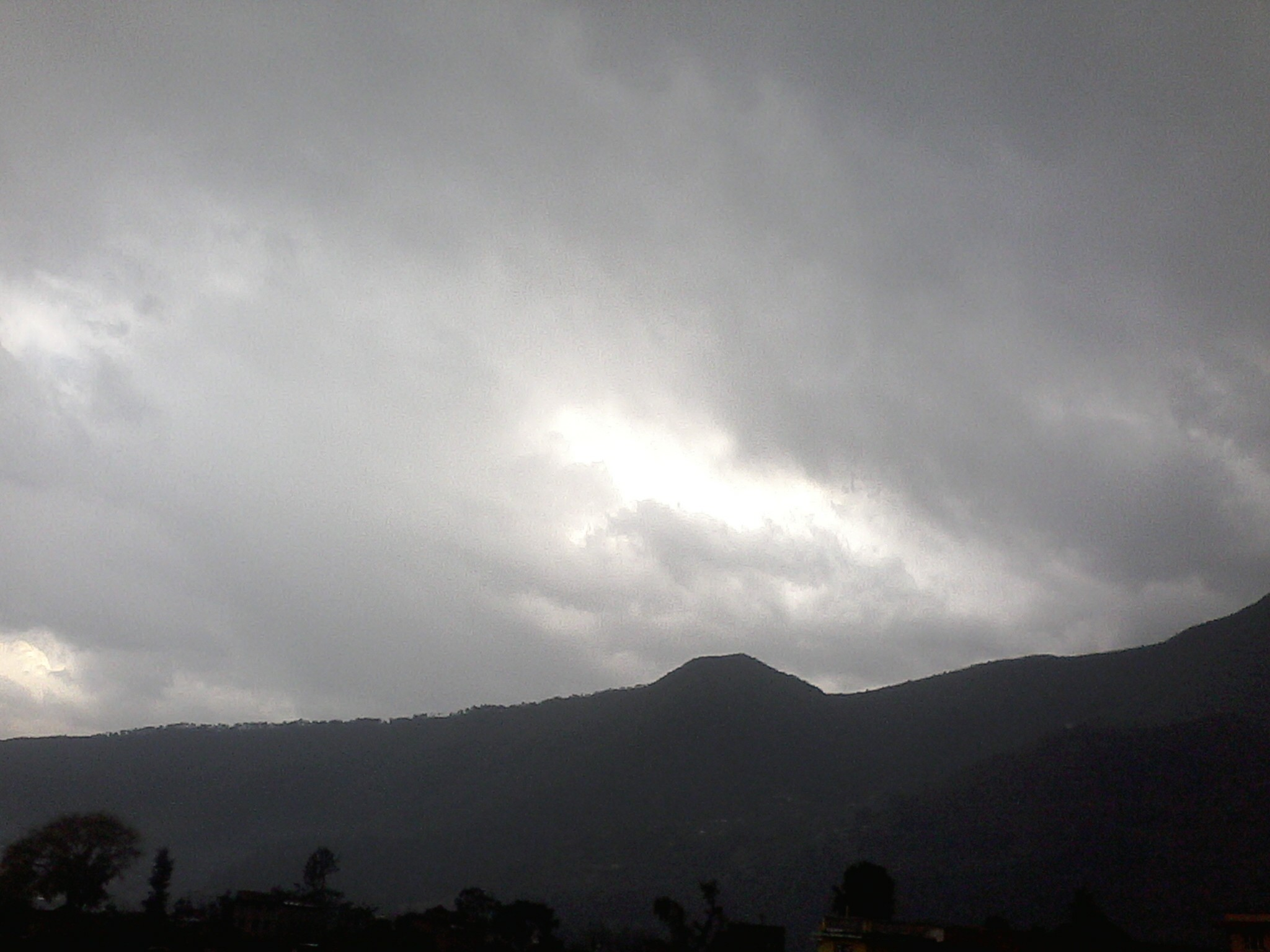
View from Charghare during rain

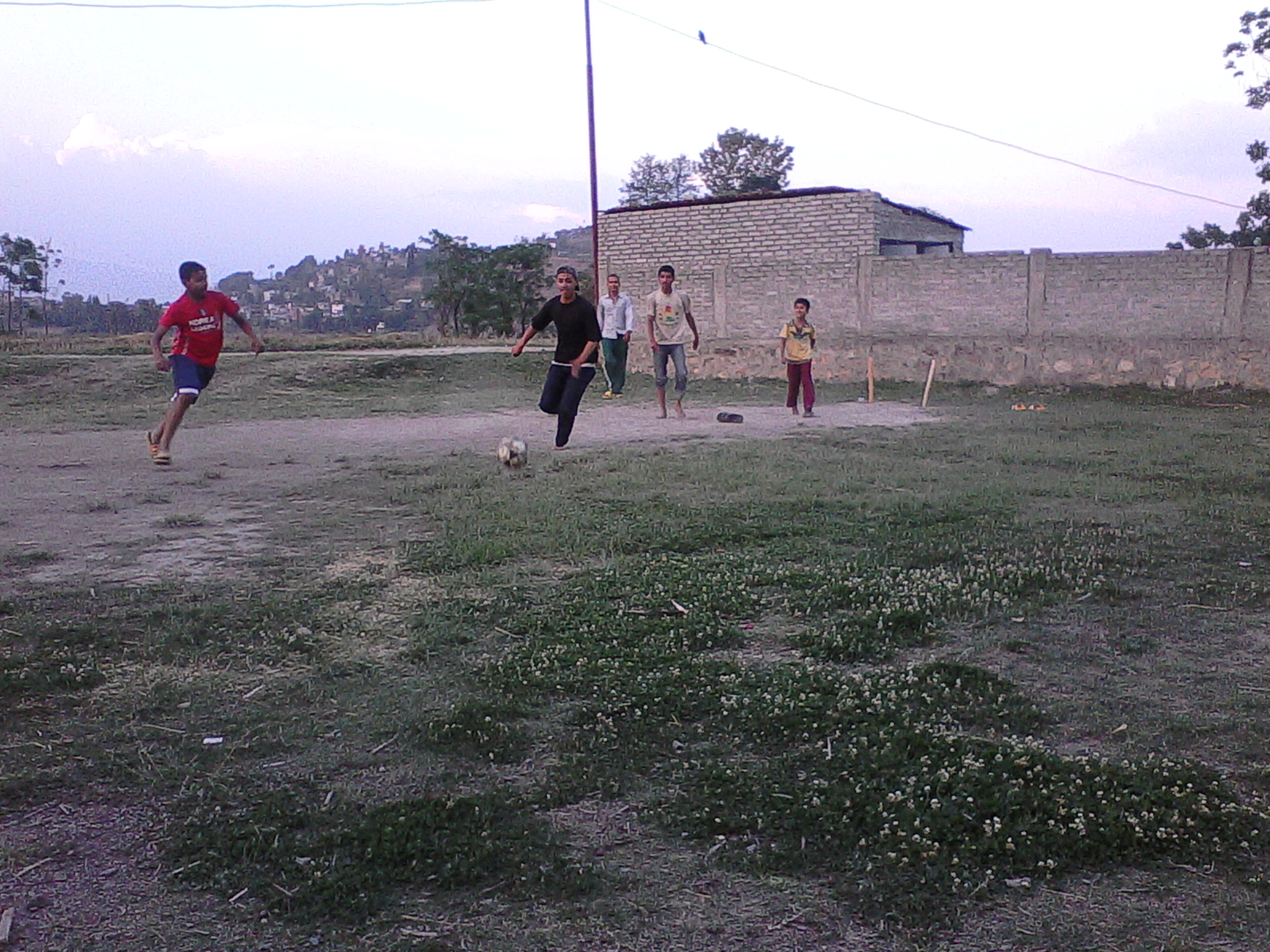
Playing football at Charghare
