= Pashupati Area Development Trust =

Organisation in Nepal

- पशुपति क्षेत्र विकास कोष
- Formation: 1986; 40 years ago
- Type: GO
- Purpose: Governing body for Pashupatinath Temple
- Headquarters: Kathmandu, Bagmati
- Website: www.pashupati.gov.np

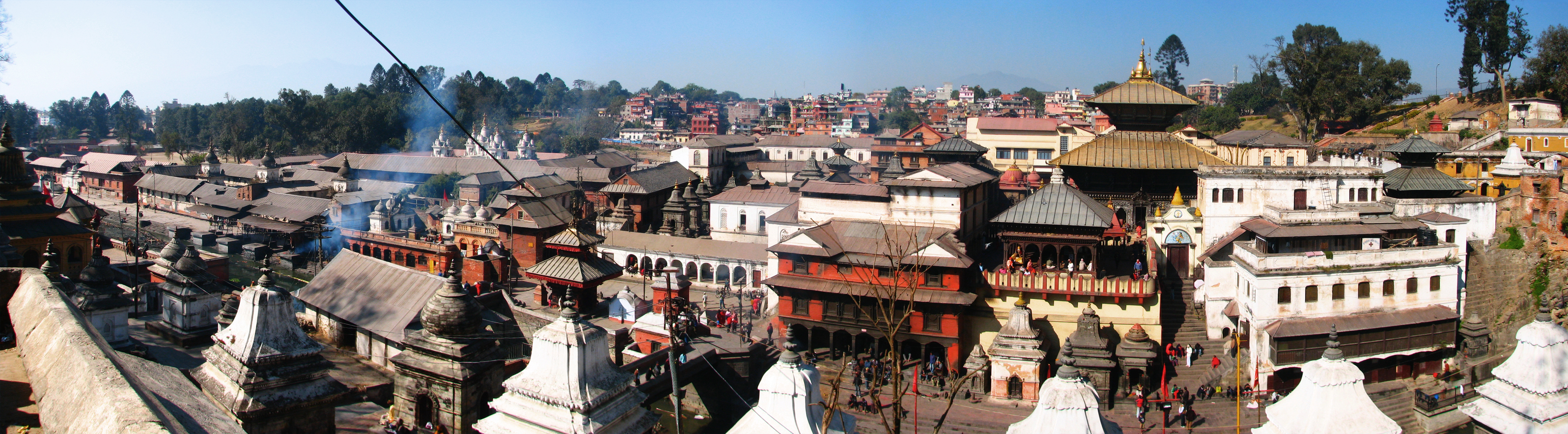
Pashupatinath Temple Panorama in Kathmandu

Pashupati Area Development Trust (PADT; Nepali: पशुपति क्षेत्र विकास कोष) is a Hindu trust established to conserve and operate the Pashupatinath Temple and other charitable institution in the Pashupatinath UNESCO World Heritage Sites area.

The trust is operated under the Pashupati Area Development Trust Act, 1987. The trust operates regular worshipping activities. This organization also conducts Hindu Funerals and has Funeral support centers, and old-age home.
