= Queen Aishwarya of Nepal =

Queen of Nepal from 1972 to 2001

Aishwarya Rajya Lakshmi Devi Shah श्री ५ बडामहारानी ऐश्वर्य राज्यलक्ष्मी देवी शाह
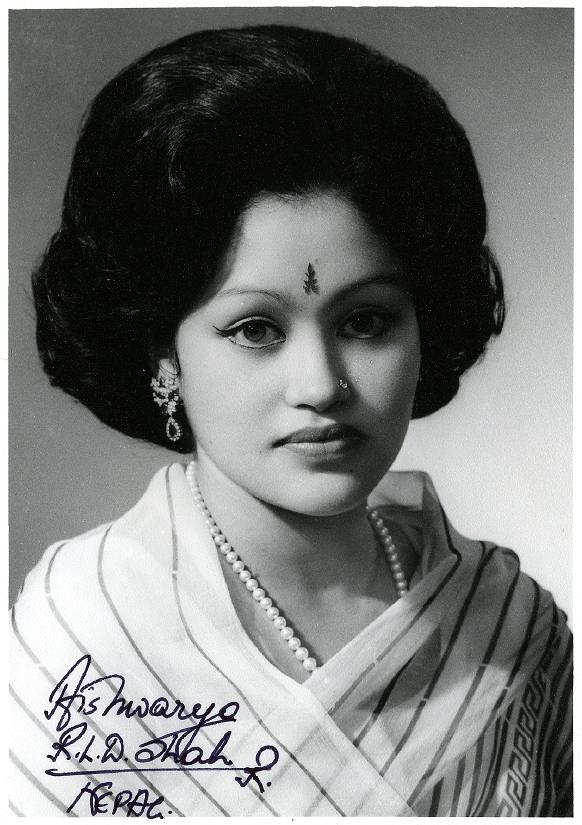
- Queen Aishwarya in 1972

Queen consort of Nepal
- Tenure: 31 January 1972 – 1 June 2001
- Coronation: 24 February 1975
- Born: 7 November 1949; Lazimpat Durbar, Kathmandu, Kingdom of Nepal
- Died: 1 June 2001 (aged 51); Narayanhiti Royal Palace, Kathmandu, Kingdom of Nepal
- Cause of death: Assassination (gunshot wounds)
- Spouse: King Birendra (m. 1970)
- Issue: Dipendra of Nepal; Princess Shruti of Nepal; Prince Nirajan of Nepal
Names
- Aishwarya Rajya Lakshmi Devi Shah
- House: Rana; by birth Shah; by marriage
- Father: Kendra Shumsher Jang Bahadur Rana
- Mother: Shree Rajya Lakshmi Devi Shah
- Religion: Hinduism

Aishwarya Rajya Lakshmi Devi Shah (Nepali: ऐश्वर्य राज्य लक्ष्मी देवी शाह; 7 November 1949 – 1 June 2001) was Queen of Nepal as the wife of King Birendra from 1972 until her assassination in the 2001 Nepalese royal massacre. She played a significant role as Birendra's consort and was a prominent figure in the royal family throughout her lifetime.

Queen Aishwarya is regarded by many Nepalese as an influential figure, known for her steadfast presence. During the pre-1990 Panchayat era, she was often considered to be a central influence behind the throne. While her sense of style shaped the cultural ideal for many, her influence went beyond appearance. She was seen as a figure of composure and support alongside her husband during a period of both political change and royal tradition.

In addition to her public role, Queen Aishwarya was a patron of the arts and made contributions to the cultural landscape of Nepal. She was known for her literary works and involvement in music, composing and writing songs under the pen-name "Chandani Shah".

== Education ==
She had her school education at St. Helen's Convent of Kurseong, India, and St Mary's of Jawalakhel, Nepal. She passed S.L.C. from Kanti Ishwari Rajya Laxmi High School in 1963. She was enrolled in the Tribhuvan University-affiliated school, Padmakanya Multiple Campus and graduated in arts in 1967.

== Family life ==
Queen Aishwarya was born into the aristocratic Rana family, which had ruled Nepal as hereditary Prime Ministers for 104 years until the 1950s. She was the eldest daughter of Kendra Shumsher Jang Bahadur Rana (1921–1982) and Shree Rajya Lakshmi Devi Shah (1926–2005). She had two brothers, Suraj Shumsher Jang Bahadur Rana and Uday Shumsher Jang Bahadur Rana, and two sisters, Komal Rajya Lakshmi Devi Shah and Prekshya Rajya Lakshmi Devi Shah.

In 1970, Aishwarya married her second cousin, then-Crown Prince Birendra of Nepal, becoming Crown Princess. Both of her sisters also married into the Shah family and became princesses by marriage—Komal married Gyanendra, who later became King, while Prekshya married Dhirendra, the youngest brother of Birendra and Gyanendra. Following Aishwarya's death in 2001, Komal became Nepal's queen consort, a position she held until the monarchy was abolished in 2008.

Birendra and Aishwarya had three children—Crown Prince Dipendra, Princess Shruti and Prince Nirajan.

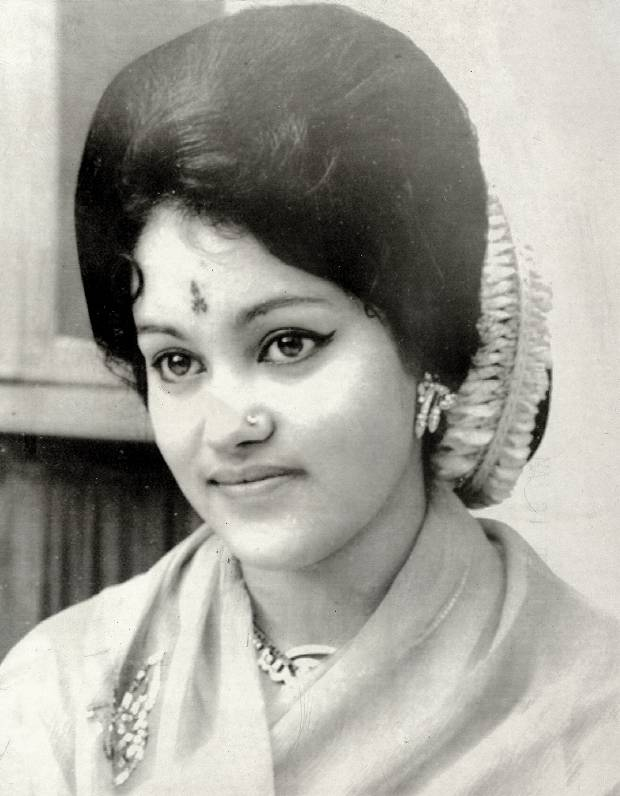
Crown Princess Aishwarya in 1970

== Queen of Nepal ==
After King Mahendra's death in 1972, Birendra ascended the throne, and Aishwarya became Queen consort. The couple formally assumed their roles that year, with their coronation taking place in 1975. During their reign, they traveled extensively and hosted numerous royal dignitaries from around the world.

Queen Aishwarya was known for her intelligence, eloquence, and active involvement in social and cultural initiatives. She organized various cultural and charitable programs and played a significant role in supporting King Birendra throughout his reign.

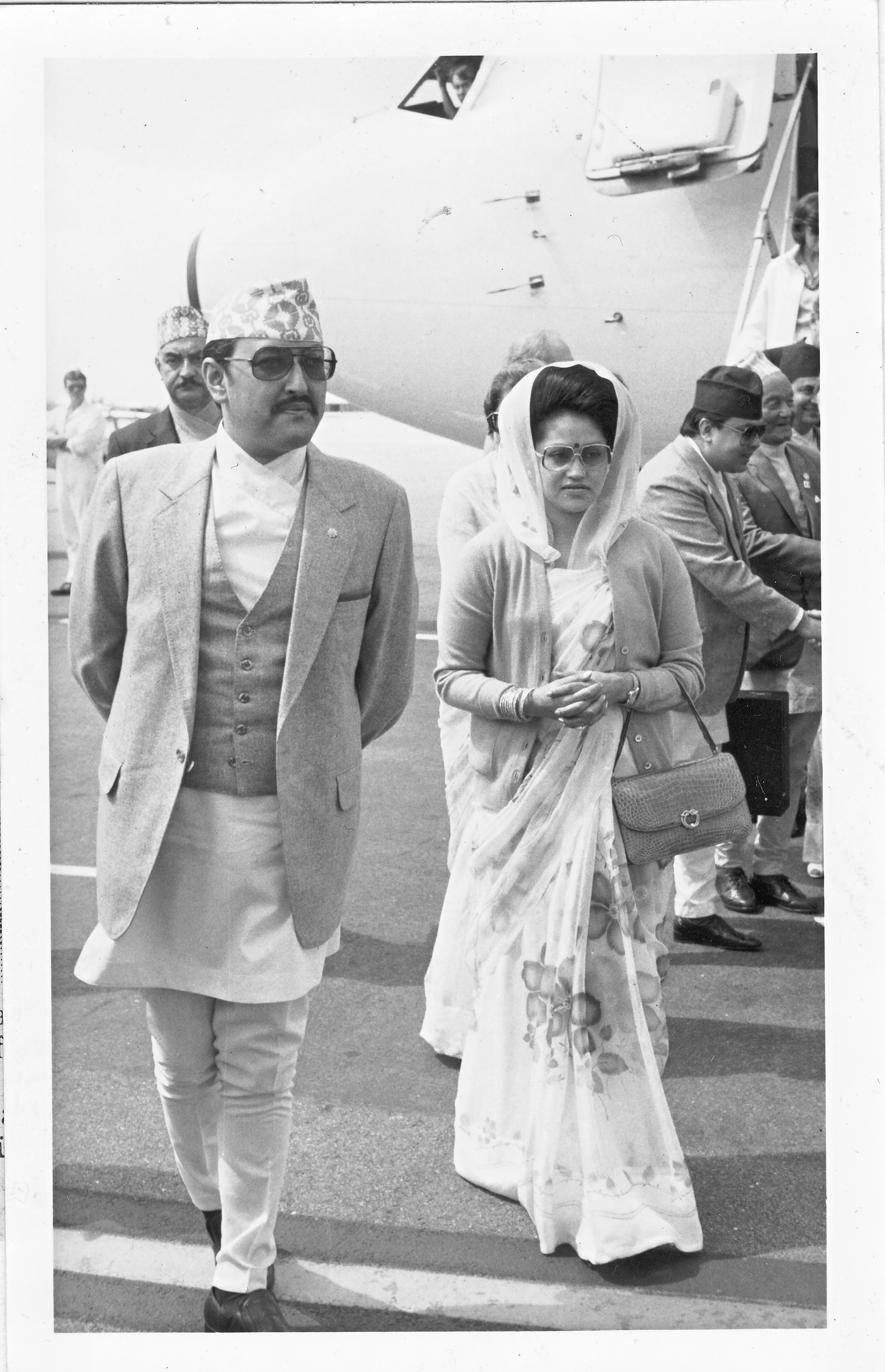
With Birendra, during a state visit to Brisbane, Australia, 1988

During the 1970s and 1980s, as Nepal faced growing political tension and movements from anti-monarchist groups, Queen Aishwarya was the subject of various rumours. Her strong presence and influence were sometimes perceived as dominance over King Birendra. Known for her outspoken and assertive nature, she was often contrasted with her more reserved husband. During the period of absolute monarchy, she was perceived as a key influence in the palace, with some believing she advocated for retaining absolute rule. However, in 1990, King Birendra ultimately agreed to transition Nepal to a constitutional monarchy, relinquishing his absolute powers.

The extent of Queen Aishwarya's influence remains debated, but over time, perceptions of her shifted. While she was once seen as a dominant figure, later accounts described her as a steadfast companion to King Birendra, whose popularity and stature grew throughout his reign.

== Literary works ==
She was interested in literature and, under the pen-name Chadani Shah, wrote dozens of poems, which have been collected under the title Aphnai Akash Aphnai Paribesh. The anthology is prefaced with criticisms about Chadani Shah's writing by veteran critics of Nepalese literature. She was also a song writer, and her songs were frequently aired by Radio Nepal and Nepal Television.

== Assassination ==
Queen Aishwarya was killed in the Nepalese royal massacre along with her husband, their three children and several other family members. It is widely believed that the motive for the massacre was strong opposition to Dipendra's proposed marriage to Devyani Rana. Her face was so badly disfigured by gunshot wounds that, for the widely attended state funeral procession, it was covered by a porcelain mask bearing her likeness.

== Honours ==
=== National ===
- Kingdom of Nepal:
  - Most Glorious Mahendra Chain
  - Member Grand Cross of the Order of Honour
  - Member Grand Cross of the Order of the Benevolent Ruler
  - Member Grand Cross of the Order of Gorkha Dakshina Bahu
  - King Birendra Investiture Medal (24 February 1975)
  - Commemorative Silver Jubilee Medal of King Birendra (31 January 1997)

=== Foreign ===
- Denmark: Dame Grand Cross of the Order of the Dannebrog
- Egypt: Grand Cross of the Order of the Virtues, Special Class
- Finland: Grand Cross of the Order of the White Rose
- France: Grand Cross of the Order of National Merit
- Germany: Grand Cross Special Class of the Order of Merit of the Federal Republic of Germany
- Japan: Dame Grand Cordon of the Order of the Chrysanthemum
- Lao Royal Family: Dame Grand Cross of Royal Order of the Million Elephants and the White Parasol
- Pakistan: Grand Cross of the Order of Excellence
- Socialist Republic of Romania: Grand Cross of the Order of 23 August
- Spain:
  - Dame Grand Cross of the Order of Charles III
  - Dame Grand Cross of the Order of Isabella the Catholic
- Thailand: Dame Grand Cordon of the Order of Chula Chom Klao (1986)
- Yugoslavia: Grand Cross Great Star of the Order of the Yugoslav Star

Royal titles
Preceded by Ratna	Queen consort of Nepal; 1972–2001	Vacant Title next held by Komal
