= Nepal Pratap Bhaskara =

Nepal Pratap Bhaskara Nepal Decoration of Honour
- Type: Order
- Awarded for: Members of the Nepalese and foreign royal families.
- Presented by: Nepal
- Established: 25 December 1966
- First award: In 1966 to King Mahendra of Nepal
- Final award: In 2001 to Queen Komal of Nepal

Highlights
- Total: 11 awarded till date
- Ribbon bar of the order

Precedence
- Next (higher): Birendra Chain
- Equivalent: Order of Ojaswi Rajanya
- Next (lower): Tribhuvan Prajatantra Bhaskara

The Nepal Pratap Bhaskara (Nepali: नेपाल प्रताप भास्कर) is a decoration of Nepal. It is also called as the Nepal Decoration of Honour. It is the highest honour of Nepal given to only foreign monarchs and Nepalese ruling sovereign.

== History ==
It is instituted on 25 December 1966 by King Mahendra Bir Bikram Shah Dev.

== Insignia ==
The ribbon of the order is blue with a white-edged red central stripe. It has a badge worn on the chest and one on the sash ribbon.

== Grades ==
The Nepal Pratap Bhaskara has one grade: Member. The decoration consists of the Sovereign (Parama-Nepal-Pratap-Bhaskara), Grand Master (Ati-Nepal-Pratap-Bhaskara), and ordinary members (Nepal-Pratap-Bhaskara). Conferred on members of the Nepalese and foreign Royal houses.

== Recipients ==
- King Mahendra of Nepal (1966)
- Queen Ratna of Nepal (1966)
- King Birendra of Nepal (1972)
- Queen Aishwarya of Nepal (1975)
- King Juan Carlos I of Spain (1983)
- King Bhumibol Adulyadej of Thailand (1986)
- Queen Sirikit of Thailand (1986)
- Queen Margrethe II of Denmark (1989)
- Crown Prince Dipendra of Nepal (1995)
- King Gyanendra of Nepal (2001)
- Queen Komal of Nepal (2001)
