= Order of Ojaswi Rajanya =

Order of Ojaswi Rajanya ओजस्वी राजन्यको मानपदवी (Order of the Benevolent Ruler)

Awarded by King of Nepal
- Type: Order
- Established: 14 May 1934
- Eligibility: Members of the Nepalese and foreign royal families.
- Status: discontinued
- Grades: Member

Statistics
- First induction: 1934
- Last induction: 2004

Precedence
- Next (higher): Mahendra Chain
- Next (lower): Tribhuvan Prajatantra Shripada
- Equivalent: Nepal Pratap Bhaskara
- Ribbon bar of the order

The Most Glorious Order of Ojaswi Rajanya (Nepali: Ojaswi Rajanyako Manapadvi) was an order of knighthood of Nepal. It was given to foreign heads of state, foreign or Nepalese monarchs.

== History ==
The order was instituted on 14 May 1934 by King Tribhuhvan Bir Bikram Shah Dev. It was the highest order of Nepal until Nepal Pratap Bhaskara was instituted in 1966.

== Insignia ==
The ribbon of the order is light yellow with narrow white edge stripes. It has a badge worn on the chest and a badge on the sash ribbon.

== Grades ==
The Order of Ojaswi Rajanya has one grade: Member. The order consists of the Sovereign (Parama-Ojaswi-Rajanya), Grand Master (Ati-Ojaswi-Rajanya), and ordinary members (Ojaswi-Rajanya). Conferred on members of the Nepalese and foreign royal families and foreign heads of state.

== Members ==
- Charles de Gaulle
- Queen Aishwarya of Nepal
- Akihito
- Ahmad Shah Khan, Crown Prince of Afghanistan
- Princess Beatrix of the Netherlands
- King Charles III
- Queen Elizabeth The Queen Mother
- Queen Elizabeth II
- Frederik X of Denmark
- Henrik, Prince Consort of Denmark
- Hirohito
- Masahito, Prince Hitachi
- Hanako, Princess Hitachi
- Queen Kanti of Nepal
- Queen Ishwari of Nepal
- Ayub Khan
- Empress Kōjun
- Queen Komal of Nepal
- Heinrich Lübke
- Empress Michiko
- Mohammad Reza Shah Pahlavi
- Indra, Crown Princess of Nepal
- Prince Philip, Duke of Edinburgh
- Prince Basundhara of Nepal
- Prince Himalaya of Nepal
- Kaiser Shumsher Jung Bahadur Rana
- Nir Shumsher Jung Bahadur Rana
- Queen Ratna of Nepal
- Princess Sirindhorn of Thailand
- Queen Sofía of Spain
- Josip Broz Tito
- King Jigme Singye Wangchuck of Bhutan
- King Maha Vajiralongkorn
- Princess Soamsawali of Thailand
- Princess Chulabhorn of Thailand
