= Baglung Airport =

Airport in Nepal

Baglung Airport बाग्लुङ विमानस्थल
- IATA: BGL; ICAO: VNBL

Summary
- Airport type: Public
- Serves: Baglung, Nepal
- Elevation AMSL: 3,320 ft / 1,012 m
- Coordinates: 28°12′46″N 83°39′59″E

Map
- Location of airport in Nepal

Runways
Direction	Length		Surface
Direction	m	ft	Surface
01/19	608	1,995	Black top pitch

Baglung Airport (IATA: BGL, ICAO: VNBL), also known as Balewa Airport, is a domestic airport serving Baglung, a municipality located in the western region of Gandaki Province of Nepal.

== History ==
Baglung Airport was originally opened in 1973 but ceased to operate after road access to Pokhara was established in 1992. On 14 January 2018, the Civil Aviation Authority of Nepal, airline companies and the Baglung municipality signed an agreement to reopen the airport. On 14 March 2018, Tara Air conducted its test flight to the airport, officially reopening it 26 years after its closure.

== Facilities ==
The airport resides at an elevation of 3,320 feet (1,012 m) above mean sea level. It has one grass/clay runway which is 608 metres (1,995 ft) in length.

== Airlines and destinations ==
Since the early 2020s, there are no scheduled services to and from Baglung Airport. Previously Nepal Airlines operated routes to Kathmandu.

== See also ==
- List of airports in Nepal
