= Prince Nirajan of Nepal =

Prince Nirajan Bir Bikram Shah Dev राजकुमार निराजन वीर विक्रम शाह देव
- Prince of Nepal
- Born: 6 November 1978; Narayanhiti Royal Palace, Kathmandu, Nepal
- Died: 1 June 2001 (aged 22); Narayanhity Royal Palace, Kathmandu, Nepal
- Cause of death: Assassination (gunshot wounds)
Names
- Nirajan Bir Bikram Shah Dev
- House: Shah dynasty
- Father: King Birendra
- Mother: Aishwarya Rajya Lakshmi Devi Shah
- Religion: Hinduism

Prince Nirajan Bir Bikram Shah Dev (Nepali: निराजन वीर विक्रम शाह; 6 November 1978 – 1 June 2001) was a prince of Nepal, the younger son of King Birendra and Queen Aishwarya of Nepal. He was assassinated along with his parents in the Nepalese royal massacre.

== Education and interests ==
He was educated at Budhanilkantha School, Kathmandu and Eton College and had a degree of B.B.A. from Kathmandu College of Management. He was interested in sports, especially swimming.

The name Nirajan means "One without fault; perfect in all forms".

== Death ==
Nirajan was among the victims of the Nepalese royal massacre on 1 June 2001 along with his father, mother, sister, brother and other close royal relatives.

== Honours ==
National Honours

- Commemorative Silver Jubilee Medal of King Birendra (31 January 1997).
