= Kingdom of Isma =

Former kingdom located in present-day Nepal

Kingdom of Isma Nepali: इस्मा
- Government: Monarchy
- Historical era: Chaubisi Rajyas
Succeeded by
Kingdom of Nepal
- Today part of: Nepal

The Kingdom of Isma (Nepali: इस्मा राज्य) was a petty kingdom in the confederation of 24 states known as Chaubisi Rajya. It was situated at the top of a big hill and there were about 250 houses.

== History ==
The Kingdom of Isma was founded around BS 1550 (c. 1493 CE). It reached east to the border of Musikot, west from the Aglung ascent to the Jhimruk river, north to Gwalichaur in Baglung, and south to the border of Dhurkot.

Local tradition mentions that Magar kings ruled Isma before the Brahmins, but several historians claim that Magars served only as local chiefs under the Licchavi and later Khas Pahari rulers, and that Isma was never an independent Magar kingdom. The region was later brought under Palpa by Aneksingh Sen of Ribdikot, and his son Khamraj Sen (1465–1510) ruled it for a time, which is why the area was also known as "Khamdesh". After the deaths of the king and queen in battle, the work of governing passed to the Aryal/Arjyal Brahmins.

Arjyal Brahmins ran the kingdom for six generations. The Arjyals later handed the political power to a Surath Singh, a Rajput political refuge in Gulmi with the Kingdom.

The westward expansion of the Gorkhali state began in the reign of Govinda Singh Rayathaur, and the Gorkhali army conquered Isma on 4 Ashwin BS 1843 (c. 1786 CE). Estimates of the dead range from about 200 Isma and 50 Nepali soldiers to 53 Khadka Chhetris, 22 Thakuris and 10 Sarkis on the Isma side against 50 Gorkhalis, and some sources say only 100 Isma soldiers died. Govinda Singh escaped and settled at his in-laws' home in Badagaun, Salyan, and the kingdom was handed to Palpa under an agreement between the Gorkhali and Palpali kings.
