= Kingdom of Bajhang =

Former kingdom located in present-day Nepal

Kingdom of Bajhang Nepali: बझाङ
- 1446–2008
- Government: Monarchy
- Raja
- Historical era: Chaubisi Rajyas
  - Established: 1446
  - Disestablished by Federal Government: 7 October 2008
Succeeded by
Kingdom of Nepal
- Today part of: Nepal

The Kingdom of Bajhang (Nepali: बझाङ) was a petty kingdom in the confederation of 24 states known as Chaubisi Rajya. The kingdom was established in 1503 BS. The kingdom was ruled by 61 thakuri kings.

In 1848 BS, the kingdom was annexed to the Kingdom of Nepal, however, the royals of Bajhang were given special status. This changed in 2017 BS when the democratic government of Nepal passed an act to not recognize any of such status. The prince of Bajhang, Om Jung, at the time was unsatisfied and appealed in court against the act, but he could not succeed to revert the act. Instead, he started to make his own army to fight against the Nepal government. In the same year, the rebellion movement of Om Jung caused a fight with Nepal police in which 150 were injured. Omjung flee to India to collect more arms and army. Later, Om Jung was killed in an army operation in Bajhang District.

The latest generation descendant seems to be Binod Singh (son of Princess Shanti Singh of Nepal), who felicitated MMA artist Rabindra Dhant in september 2024.

== Kings (Rajas) of Bajhang ==
Following are the list of kings (rajas) of Bajhang

1. Raja Bam Bajhang (राजा बम बझाङ) (Son of Malaibam; he founded the Kingdom of Bajhang. According to some sources, his father, who ruled over the Khas Empire, gave him the small portion of territory known as Bajhang. He died in Battle of Sinja.)
2. Shree Bam (श्री बम) (Son of Raja Bham Bajhang)
3. Jayati Bam Bajhang (जयाती बम बझाङ)
4. Malai Bam Bajhang (मलाई बम बझाङ)
5. Shakti Singh (शक्ति सिंह) (died in 1408) (while Raja Bam Bajhang was the first King of Bajhang, Shakti Singh was the first formal King of Bajhang. He also built Byasikot Durbar and changed the surname of the kings of Bajhang from Bam to Singh.)
6. Jakti Singh (जक्ति सिंह) (He was the son Shakti Singh he was supposed to succeed his father but he has took his military career in 1404. He never became a king and had an internal conflict with his brother Sujan Singh because he has reblied with his own family. Following his territorial disputes with his bother he has broke away from the main kingdom of Bahajang and had march unto neighbouring territory of thalahara and had formed the kingdom of thalahara in Baise Rajya. He was involved heavily involved in battle outside of kingdom such as wars of succession over the collapse of Khas Empire , he has also long standing conflict with humla dullu region. To defeat them he had from an alliance with Prince Baliraj which successfully led the conquer conquer jumla and jumla This campaign had successfully overthrown the old regional order and led to the historic coronation of Prince in the throne of jumla in 1404 AD , this also established the famous Kalyal Dynasty in jumla which ended in 1789 AD.)
7. Sujan Singh (सुजन सिंह) (1408-1415)( He has ruled over bahajang from 7 years.During the early 15th century, Bajhang was not yet a fully consolidated, independent powerhouse but was a minor principality within the broader, fracturing dynamics of the Far-Western Khas Empire. Sujan Singh’s reign was characterized by geopolitical vulnerability. The regional principalities (which later formalized into the Baise Rajya or 22 Kingdoms) were constantly at war with one another over fertile valley lands, trade routes, and fortresses (kots). Bajhang sat precariously between the heavily influential Kingdom of Doti and the remnants of the Jumla administration. Rather than waging expansive external conquests, Sujan Singh’s military engagements were defensive frontier skirmishes aimed at protecting the young kingdom's borders from aggressive neighbors. His reign concluded in 1415 AD, after which he was succeeded by King Sahu Singh, who managed a much longer, more stabilizing 32-year rule.)
8. Sahu Singh (शाहु सिंह) बझाङ (1414-1446)(Sahu Singh had ruled over bahajang for 32 years. Unlike his predecessor, who only managed a turbulent seven-year rule, Sahu Singh’s extended tenure gave him the time needed to lay down deep roots for the young kingdom.• During the 15th century, the far-western Baise Rajya principalities relied entirely on fortified hilltops called kots. Sahu Singh's primary military and architectural achievement was fortifying the borders of Bajhang against the larger Kingdom of Doti. He focused local labor on building defensive stone outposts to guard the river valleys.While Sahu Singh did not wage massive regional expansion campaigns, his military forces frequently engaged in territorial skirmishes. The primary conflict of his reign was a series of localized, seasonal border battles against neighboring chieftains over control of high-altitude alpine ridges and migratory animal trade routes.His long-standing rule stabilized the palace hierarchy. Upon his death in 1446 AD, the crown passed directly to King Bhew Singh.
9. Bhew Singh (भ्यु सिंह) बझाङ (1446-1473)(Bhew Singh had ruled over bahajang over 27 years. Bhew Singh had governed during a critical period in Far-Western Nepal where once stood the old Khas Empire which had been completely shattered, leaving a power vacuum. During his reign he had faced immense struggle from the powerful kingdom of doti.Doti considered many of the smaller surrounding principalities—including Bajhang—as its rightful subordinates. Bhew Singh fought multiple seasonal, defensive border battles to keep the Doti kings from encroaching into the Seti River valley corridors. Military operations during his reign did not involve massive standing armies or open-field clashes. Instead, warfare was localized and centered around the kots (hilltop forts). Bhew Singh's forces engaged in grueling siege tactics and ambush skirmishes to protect local agricultural trade routes and alpine valleys from neighboring rival chieftains.• Because he maintained the kingdom’s borders intact against stronger neighbors for nearly three decades, his reign is regarded by historians as a period of consolidation. He successfully preserved the distinct administrative independence of Bajhang, passing down a secure territory when he died. Following his death in 1473 AD, he was succeeded by King Hari Singh, who inherited a well-defended and battle-tested principality.)
10. King Hari Singh (राजा हरि सिंह)(1473-1503)(Son of Bhew Singh he ruled of bahajang for 30 years.Hari Singh’s three-decade reign was heavily defined by the rapid fragmentation of the old Khas Empire and intense regional rivalry. Bajhang’s most persistent threat during this era was the Kingdom of Doti. Doti was a dominant regional powerhouse that consistently tried to turn Bajhang into a tax-paying vassal state. Hari Singh spent much of his reign engaging in defensive border warfare to block Doti's advances into the strategic Seti River valley. During his reign Bajhang controlled access to lucrative northern trade routes heading toward Tibet, it was a frequent target. Hari Singh successfully led his forces in periodic ambush campaigns and hill-fort (kot) defenses against both the Raika rulers of Doti and rival Malla chieftains from neighboring areas. • Despite the constant external pressures and localized skirmishes, his 30-year rule is considered highly successful by historians. He managed to fully secure the territorial integrity of Bajhang without losing ground to his larger neighbors. Upon his death in 1503 AD, he passed a stable, sovereign, and well-fortified kingdom to his successor, King Pratap Singh.)
11. King Partap Singh(प्रताप सिंह)(1503 -1526)( Partap Singh had ruled over for bahajang for 23 years.Pratap Singh's lifetime was defined by shifting regional boundaries and the constant threat of absorption by the dominant Kingdom of Doti and because of that is main focus for 23 years was too prevent the expension of Raika kings of Doti from seizing Bajhang's lowland rice valleys. Pratap Singh commanded local forces in several fierce seasonal skirmishes along the disputed frontier borders. Battles during his time did not look like massive open-field clashes. Instead, they were gritty, defensive sieges. Pratap Singh heavily utilized Bajhang's high-altitude hilltop fortresses, using them as launchpads to ambush invaders and protect the lucrative salt and wool trade routes moving north toward Tibet. His greatest historical achievement was successfully passing down the kingdom entirely intact. Despite being surrounded by aggressively expanding neighbors, his defensive tactics ensured Bajhang remained independent. Upon his death in 1526 AD, he was succeeded by King Malaibam Singh, who inherited a highly fortified and strategically secure domain.)
12. Malaibam Singh (मलाई बम सिंह)(1526-1534)( His exact birth date his own but according to some historian say he was born during his grandfather regin in late 14 century. He ruled over bahajang for 21 years. Malaibam Singh’s lifetime was defined by aggressive regional polarization, as neighboring principalities weaponized the collapse of the central Khas Empire to expand their Like his predecessor he has also faced kingdom of doti ,While prior kings focused exclusively on defensive actions, Malaibam Singh actively commanded retaliatory operations against Doti's frontier garrisons to stop their encroachment into the Seti River valley.Under his command, Bajhang's army heavily fortified their kots (hilltop forts). He led forces through several grueling seasonal sieges, blocking hostile rival chieftains who tried to seize control of the valuable Himalayan trade networks flowing north toward Tibet. His tactical maneuvering kept the micro-state structurally sound and completely independent.)
13. Prthvi Singh
14. Ratan Singh (रतन सिंह)
15. Dungur Singh (डुंगरा सिंह)
16. Jitari Singh (1534-1569)
17. Madheni Singh
18. Indra Singh (इन्द्र सिंह) (died in 1569)
19. Rajkumar Bijay Singh
20. Bhairab Singh (भैरब सिंह) (1569-1606)
21. Rajkumar Mukti Singh
22. Dilip Singh (1606-1641)
23. Mahendra Singh (died in 1641)
24. Rajkumar Gugu Singh (राजकुमार गगु सिंह)
25. Rajkumar Birbhadra Singh (राजकुमार वीरभद्र सिंह)
26. Prighvi Singh (पृथ्वी सिंह) (died in 1641)
27. Ratan Singh (रतन सिंह) (died in 1671)
28. Kalyan Singh (कल्याण सिंह) (1679-1688)
29. Amar Singh (अमर सिंह) (1688-1730)
30. Samundar Singh (समुन्द्र सिंह) (1730-1804)
31. Raghunath Singh (1804-1807)
32. Indra Singh (इन्द्र सिंह) (1807-1812

54 Bikram Bhadur Singh(Frist regin)(विक्रम बहादुर सिंह)(Bikram Bhadur Singh born in 1854 and died 23 December 1923. His Frist regin started from mid of 19 century in late 1860s to early 1870s, specifically following the rule of his predecessor, Bhupendra Singh. Historical documents point to his rule being fully active by 1874 (1931 BS), which is the year he issued a prominent Shyaha Mohar Rukka (royal decree) as the reigning Raja. His first reign lasted until his forced abdication in 1889. To bridge the geopolitical gap between the autonomous Bajhang state and the ruling Kathmandu central government, Bikram Bahadur Singh married Rani Rudra Kumari Devi. She was the daughter of Nepal's highly powerful Rana Prime Minister, Jung Bahadur Rana.On August 20, 1877, his eldest son and heir, Jaya Prithvi Bahadur Singh, was born in Chainpur, Bajhang. Jaya Prithvi would grow up to become one of Nepal’s greatest humanitarians, educators, and social reformers.• As his eldest son showed remarkable early brilliance, the central Rana government intervened. At age eight, Jaya Prithvi was taken away from Bajhang to Kathmandu to be educated at the exclusive Thapathali Durbar School, effectively putting the future king under the watchful eye and cultural molding of the Rana regime.• Despite the marriage alliance, Bikram Bahadur Singh fiercely valued the internal autonomy of Bajhang. Over the 1880s, severe political differences and administrative disagreements broke out between him and the autocratic Rana Prime Minister in Kathmandu. Bikram Bahadur resisted the absolute subjugation of his state to the Rana dynasty's centralizing policies.The friction reached a breaking point in 1889. Unable to tolerate his independence, the Rana regime applied intense political pressure, stripping Bikram Bahadur of his power and forcing him to abdicate the throne. His 12-year-old son was subsequently crowned as a minor king under Kathmandu’s close supervision.)

55 jay prithvi bhadur Singh (जय पृथ्वी बहादुर सिंह)(1889-1914 . He was born in August 21 1877 and died October 15 1940 aged 60 in Banglore India .He ascended the throne as a young boy in 1889 after his father was forced to abdicate by th. central Rana regime. He chose to voluntarily walk away from his crown in 1914 to travel the world and preach global peace, passing the throne back to his father.In 1894, at age 17, he married Khageshwari Devi (also recorded as Khagaraja Divyeshwari), the daughter of the powerful central Rana Prime Minister, Chandra Shumsher Jang Bahadur Rana. The marriage unfortunately bore no surviving children (their infant daughter died tragically at six months old). Consequently, they adopted his niece, Shanti Kumari Singh (the daughter of his brother, Bir Jung Bahadur Singh .Disillusioned by the Rana regime's strict bans on educating common citizens, he personally authored and published Aksharank Shiksha, universally recognized as the very first primary textbook and grammar guide in the Nepali language. He funded and expanded over 150 schools, making education accessible to poor children by distributing free slates, books, and clothing. In 1899, he was instrumental in establishing and managing the Gorkhapatra Corporation, creating Nepal's very first continuously published national newspaper.Long before modern legal frameworks existed, he introduced Mohani Haq (tenant farmer land rights) in Bajhang, protecting poor farmers from exploitation. He also built Ayurvedic hospitals, roads, and bridges for the public.His progressive activities and textbooks alarmed his conservative Rana in-laws in Kathmandu. Despised by the ruling class, he left Nepal for good. He established The Humanity newspaper in Bangalore and traveled internationally—even addressing the World Fellowship of Faiths in Chicago in 1933, where American papers like the New York Times covered his unique philosophy of "Humanism".Showing true global empathy, he traveled to Africa to volunteer as a medic to treat casualties during the Italian invasion of Ethiopia, where he was briefly imprisoned by Fascist Italian forces. He was also later jailed by the British in India for supporting the Indian anti-colonial revolutionary movement.)

56 bikram bhadur Singh(second regin)(विक्रम बहादुर सिंह)(born in 1854 and died 23 December 1923 . His second regin start from 1914 to 1923 after Raja jay prithvi bhadur Singh after he was exile.Because the throne was suddenly vacant, Raja Bikram Bahadur Singh stepped out of retirement and assumed power for a second time.His second reign directly overlapped with World War I (1914–1918). As a subordinate principality under the central Kingdom of Nepal, Bajhang had to contribute financial tribute and coordinate regional recruitment drives for the British-Gurkha war efforts demanded by Rana Prime Minister Chandra Shumsher.Bikram Bahadur spent his final years walking a diplomatic tightrope. He had to ensure that his son's radical, anti-establishment reputation abroad did not give Kathmandu an excuse to permanently annex Bajhang or strip away its hereditary privileges. He successfully maintained the peace until his death in 1923.He had 14 children among them where:

Raja Jaya Prithvi Bahadur Singh: His eldest son (born to his senior queen, Rani Rudra Kumari, who became the legendary 56th King, world traveler, and humanist.

Raja Devi Jung Bahadur Singh: The son who directly succeeded him after his death in 1923, becoming the 57th King of Bajhang and ruling until 1941.

57 Devi Jung bhadur Singh(देवी जंग बहादुर सिंह)(1924-1941 he was born in 1884 and died in 1941. He begins his reign in 1924 until 1941 where he died . He was the son of Bikram bhadur Singh. He was married to Rani Ganga Kumari Devi (also known as Ganga Divyeshwari). She was the prominent daughter of Commanding-General Raja Khadga Shumsher Jang Bahadur Rana, a powerful former Commander-in-Chief (Mukhtiyar) of Nepal. This marriage cemented a massive political alliance between the autonomous Bajhang state and the elite Rana regime in Kathmandu.He had several sons who shaped Western Nepalese history, including Raja Ram Jang Bahadur Singh (the 58th Raja), Raja Ishwari Jung Bahadur Singh (the 59th Raja and Supreme Court Judge), Krishna, Dharma, Keshar, Lakshman, and Sarbeshwar.Because his wife was the daughter of the exiled leader Khadga Shumsher Rana, Devi Jung had to walk a very fine line to maintain Bajhang’s autonomous princely state status without angering the ruling Prime Ministers in Kathmandu (like Bhim Shumsher and Juddha Shumsher).He quietly maintained the socio-educational foundations laid down by his predecessor, Raja Jaya Prithvi Bahadur Singh, allowing Bajhang to remain one of the more progressive and literate pockets of far-western Nepal during an era where public education was largely restricted across the country.)

58 Ram Jung bhadur Singh (राम जंग बहादुर सिंह.)(1941 - unkown he was the member of Nepali Congress and had succeed his father Devi Jung bhadur Singh in 1941. He was heavily aligned with the expatriated Nepali Congress party. Due to his opposition to the absolute monarchical Panchayat system in Kathmandu, he spent many years living in exile in India. In the early 1960s, his son, Om Jang Bahadur Singh, led an armed democratic insurrection into western Nepal. His son was eventually cornered and killed by the Nepal Army in the high mountains between Darchula and Bajhang.Following a royal pardon from King Mahendra, Raja Ram Jang historicially returned from exile to Bajhang in May 1971. He later lived mostly in Kathmandu and reconciled with the ruling Shah dynasty. His nephew Deepak Jang (the 60th Raja) went on to marry Princess Shanti, the daughter of King Mahendra in 1963.

59 nominated om Jung bhadur Singh(ओम जङ्ग बहादुर सिंह)(om jung bhadurSingh was born during the peak of Rana Shah era . He was the son Raja ram bhadur Singh. He had ruled over Bajhang since his father was exile in India . He was killed in action in 1963during a military operation led by the Royal Nepalese Army in the rugged mountains of Far-Western Nepal because he was unhappy with The raja Rajuta Unmulan Ain, 2017 ( kingship Abolition Act, 1960) which was an aggressive state-centralization act introduced by King Mahendra. Before this act, Nepal allowed unified peripheral principalities to run their own localized courts, enforce local policing, collect land revenues (malpot), and manage internal security . His reign only for 2 or 3 years. death in 1962). The enforcement of the 2017 B.S. Act immediately collided with his ascension. In 1960, the B.P. Koirala administration sent a federal judge named Uttam Kumar Pokhrel to Bajhang to completely shut down the traditional palace courts and establish a modern, centralized judicial system. Om Jung resisted, famously arresting and imprisoning the federal judge at Bhopul Durbar, which triggered the military intervention that ended his rule. According to this act there where 17 kingdom and only 4 of them kingdom of Bajhang,( Which was Deepak jung bhadur Singh since om jung bhadur Singh wasn't recognised by kingdom of Nepal), kingdom of Mustang(led King Angun Tenzing Trandul but the state has recognised his youngest son jigme dorje palbar bista) kingdom of salyana(led by king Gopendra bhadur Shah) kingdom of jajarkot(led by captain Raja Prakash Bikram Shah ) and others 7 monarchies that weren't allowed to pace there title to next generation where kingdom birkot, bajura , drama etc. Most people criticise this thing because at thst time most of the states where relatives ot shah family in one or another way)

60 He wad Deepak jung bhadur Singh(दीपक जंग बहादुर सिंह)( Deepak Jung bhadur Singh was born around 1940 was the son Bahadur Singh offten Raha Devi Jung bhadur Singh and Rani of Bajhang . He had complete school from normal school in India and had married in February 8 1965 in Kathmandu Nepal . He had married to shanti Singh daughter of king Mahendra.)

61 Binod Singh( विनोद सिंह)( last king of bajhang. Born binod bhadur Singh of bahajang. He is son Deepak jung bhadur Singh and princess shanti Singh of Nepal who is daughter of king Mahendra of Nepal and this marking briendra of Nepal. Through his father binod is related to monarchy of Bajhang and through his mother related Shah dynasty of Nepal and also rana dynasty. He was titler king of Bajhang from 1989 until 2008 when monarchy was abolished. He is too siblings pramod and Chhaya Devi. Not much is known about them but Chhaya Devi is married to Pradeep Bikram Rana of jajarkot and this makes binod relate to former Nepali monarchies of Nepal. And his related through them from his mother younger sister marriage to king Relations ÷

he is the nephew king breindra , gyanendra dhirendra, princess sharada , princess shova and prince Ravindra illegement son of king Mahendra through his illegitimate wife Geeta gurung. He is the first cousin of dipendra, Shruti, nirajan, paras, prerana bikash Bikram,Deebas Bikram ,Ashish Bikram, princess Puja, princess Dilasha , princess sitashma , sheya Shah ,Ushaana laela Shah , Himvan shahi, Manuja Shah. He is also uncle of girvana Rajya laxmi, surangana Rajya laxmi , princess purnika , prince hridayendra , princess kirtika parthav bhadur Singh ,vignajeet shahi , Rayaki shahi , manushree Shahi . Through is maternal grandmother Indra Rajya laxmi Devi Shah whose father was Hari sumsher who was the son juddha sumsher Jung bhadur Rana making juddha binod great great grandfather. And he is also related juddha by uncle wife who where juddha great granddaughter he also related arzu Rana debua who as also granddaughter of juddha sumsher by her father binod sumsher and this makes arzu son jaybir Rana debua his uncle and sher bhadur debua his grandfather. Also through juddha sumsher he is related to entire sumsher family of Nepal and also he is related to Thapa dynasty because great great grandfather dir sumsher Jung bhadur Rana whose mother Ganesh Kumari thapa younger sister mathabar Singh thapa father nain Singh thapa younger brother bhimsen thapa . He is also related to Basnet family because bhimsen thapa grandfather bir bhadra thapa aunt wife Shivam Singh Basnet and aslso Pandey family through tulram Pandey by Ganesh Pandey

He has two children riddhima singh and Devengana Singh . He also owns hotel Sherpa

There was another king who ruled between ram Jung Deepak when om Jung wasn't recognized by the state it was raja iswari Jung bhadur Singh who was a member of the royal family of Bajhang and served as a judge of supreme court of Nepal

== See also ==
- Bajhang District
