= Galkot Durbar =

Palace in Nepal

- गलकोट दरबार
- Interactive map of the Galkot Durbar area

General information
- Location: Galkot, Baglung, Nepal
- Coordinates: 28.238385223415765°N 83.4229542886626°E

Galkot Durbar (Nepali: गलकोट दरबार) is a historical palace located in Galkot, Gandaki Province, Nepal.

It was built by King Bharat Bam Malla, the then Kingdom of Galkot, a petty kingdom in the confederation of 24 states known as Chaubisi Rajya.

Historical documents from the palace were looted by Maoists during the Nepalese Civil War. Galkot Durbar is currently in a neglected stage.

Galkot Durbar has been described as "Galkot's crown jewels".
