= Kingdom of Argha =

Former kingdom located in present-day Nepal

Kingdom of Argha Nepali: अर्घा
- Demonym: Argali
- Government: Monarchy
- Historical era: Chaubisi Rajyas
| Preceded by | Succeeded by |
| Kingdom of Palpa | पाल्पा राज्य |
- Today part of: Nepal

The Kingdom of Argha (Nepali: अर्घा) was a petty kingdom in the confederation of 24 states known as Chaubisi Rajya. It was part of the Kingdom of Palpa before it seceded to become an independent kingdom. Later Argha, and the Kingdom of Khanchi merged, becoming Arghakhanchi. Argha was annexed into the Kingdom of Nepal during the Unification of Nepal by commanders Amar Singh Thapa and Damodar Pande.
