= Kingdom of Ghiring =

Former kingdom located in present-day Nepal

Kingdom of Ghiring Nepali: घिरिङ्ग
- Government: Monarchy
- Historical era: Chaubisi Rajyas
Succeeded by
Kingdom of Nepal
- Today part of: Nepal

The Kingdom of Ghiring (Nepali: घिरिङ्ग राज्य) was a petty kingdom in the confederation of 24 states known as Chaubisi Rajya. Ghiring was formerly part of the Kingdom of Tanahun, it became independent after their brothers divided the kingdom into three sub-division.
