= Kingdom of Butwal =

Former kingdom located in present-day Nepal

Kingdom of Batwal Nepali: बुटवल
- Government: Monarchy
- Historical era: Chaubisi Rajyas
Preceded by	Succeeded by
Kingdom of Palpa	Kingdom of Nepal
- Today part of: Nepal

The Kingdom of Batwal (Nepali: बुटवल राज्य) was a petty kingdom in the confederation of 24 states known as Chaubisi Rajya. Batwal was part of Kingdom of Palpa, it became independent, however, it was later merged back in 1710 after the first King Binayak Sen's grandson had no children. In 1804, Batwal was annexed by the Gorkhas.
