= Vassal states of Nepal =

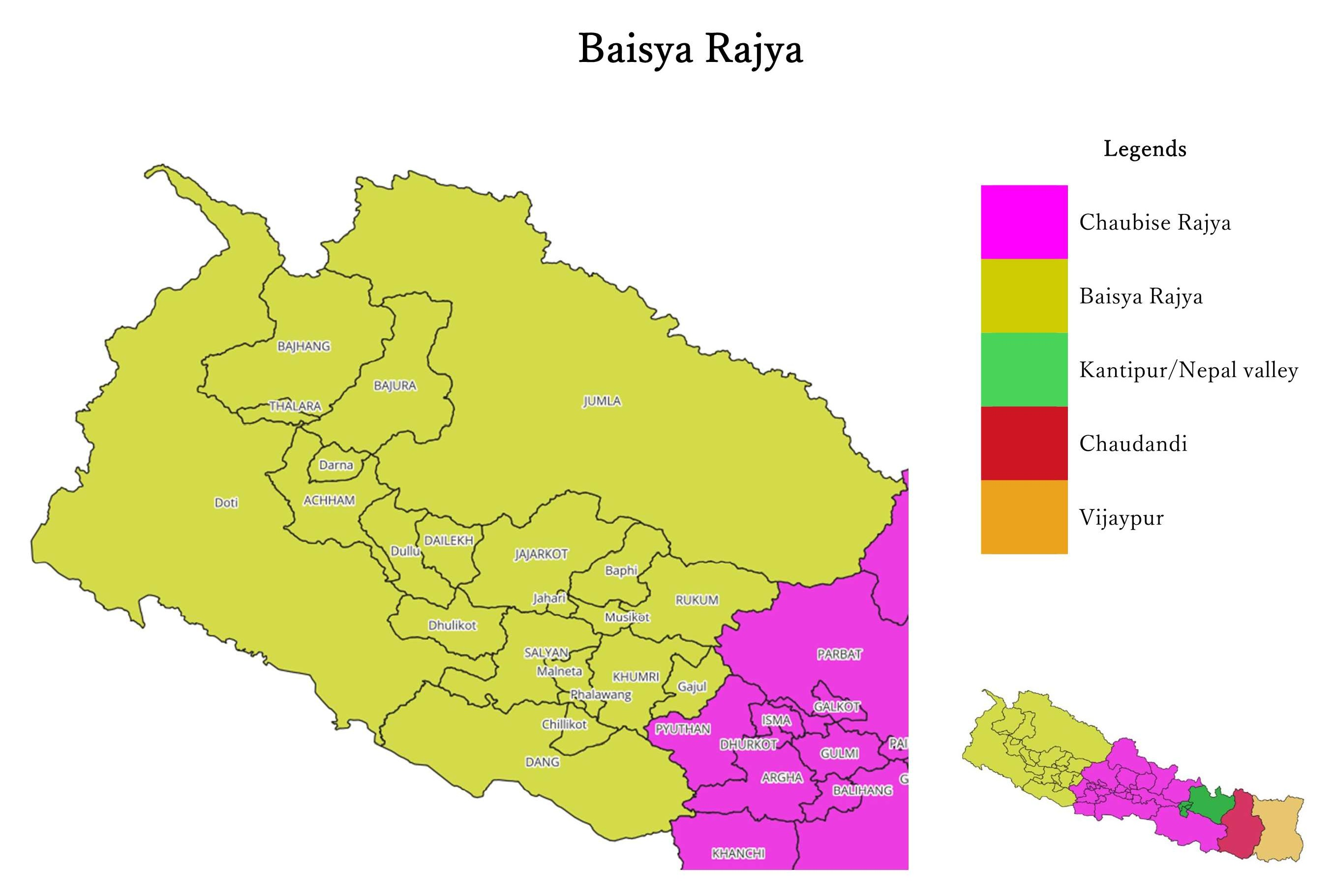
Nepal Baisya Rajyas 22 states of Nepal before unification

The Petty States, also known as Rajauta State, (Nepali: रजौटा राज्य ) was a formal entity in the history of the Kingdom of Nepal, initially a sovereign and later a nominal entity after 2017 BS. These kingdoms, which were incorporated into Nepal through treaties of dependency, were ruled by local kings. The rulers of the Petty kingdom were largely allowed to govern their own territories, but were not allowed to have relations with states outside Nepal, and were not allowed to wage war against other kingdoms. As they contributed to the unification of Nepal, the Raja Rajouta was given the authority to oversee land revenue, administration, and justice within the kingdom, in addition to foreign relations and military affairs. They were married into the royal family, the Rana khalak. Until 2017, they were ranked 24th in the order of precedence.

Before the enactment of the Rajouta Act in 2017, 16 princely states were officially recognized. The State Princely Act recognizes the kings of the following seventeen princely states: Salyan, Jajarkot, Mustang, Bajhang, Bhirkot, Darna, Bajura, Thalahara, Galkot, Gulmi, Garaukot, Maleneta, Dullu, Parbat, Nuwakot, Khumrikot (Pyuthan), and Udayapur (Pyuthan).

In 1959 during the premiership of KI singh, vassal kingdoms were deprived from their judicial authority. The vassal kingdoms and right and privileges of their rulers were abolished by the Rajya Rajauta Ain on 1961 April 9. The act recongnise the status of rulers of Mustang, Salyan, Jajarkot, and Bajhang to keep their inheritable titles. The Crown Prince of Bajhang had revolt against this act but was suppressed and killed. The remaining titular kingships under Nepali sovereignty were abolished after the country is declared republic on 2008 Oct 7.

== List ==
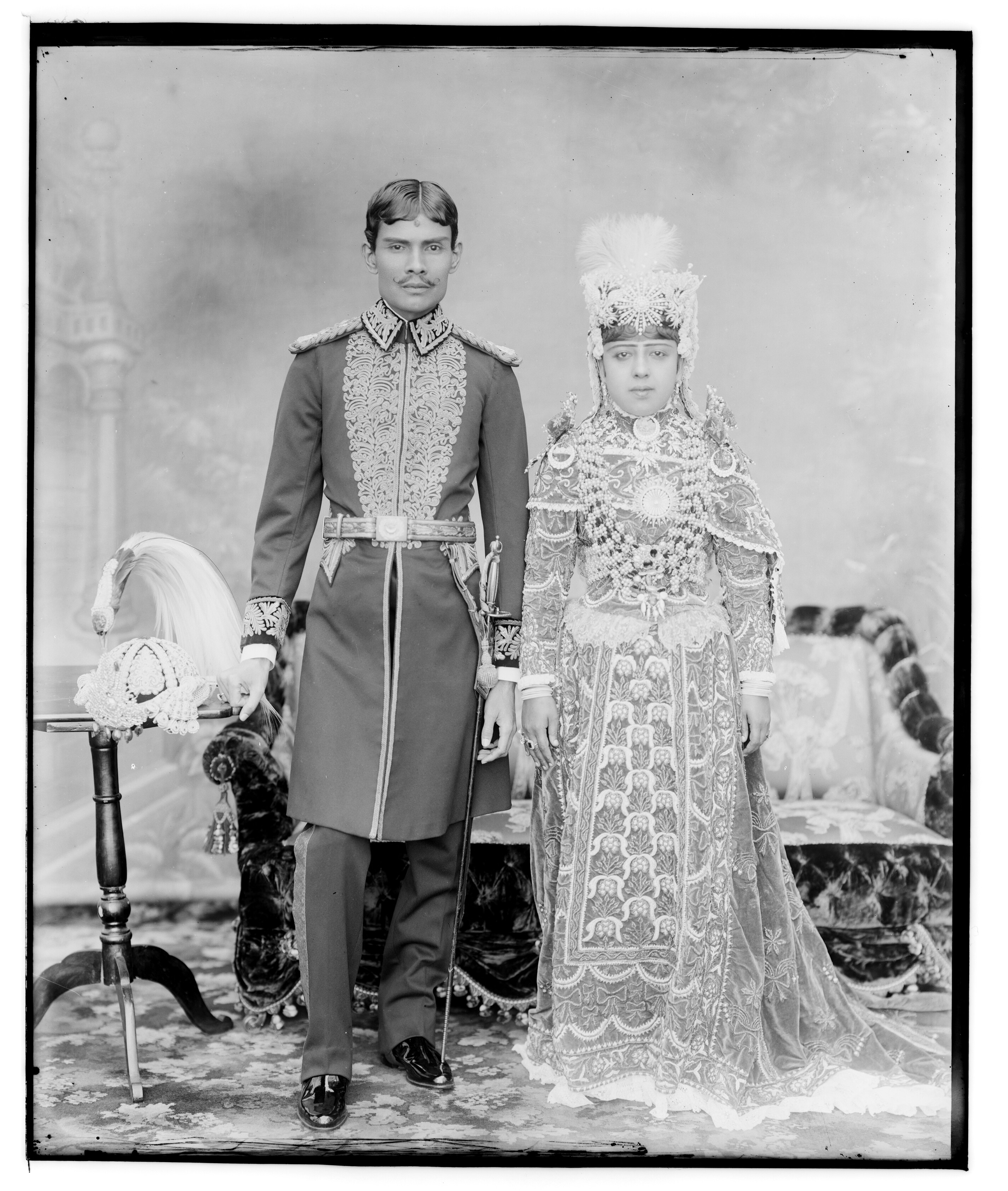
Raja of Bajhang Jaya Prithvi Bahadur Singh with his wife Khagaraja Divyeshwari

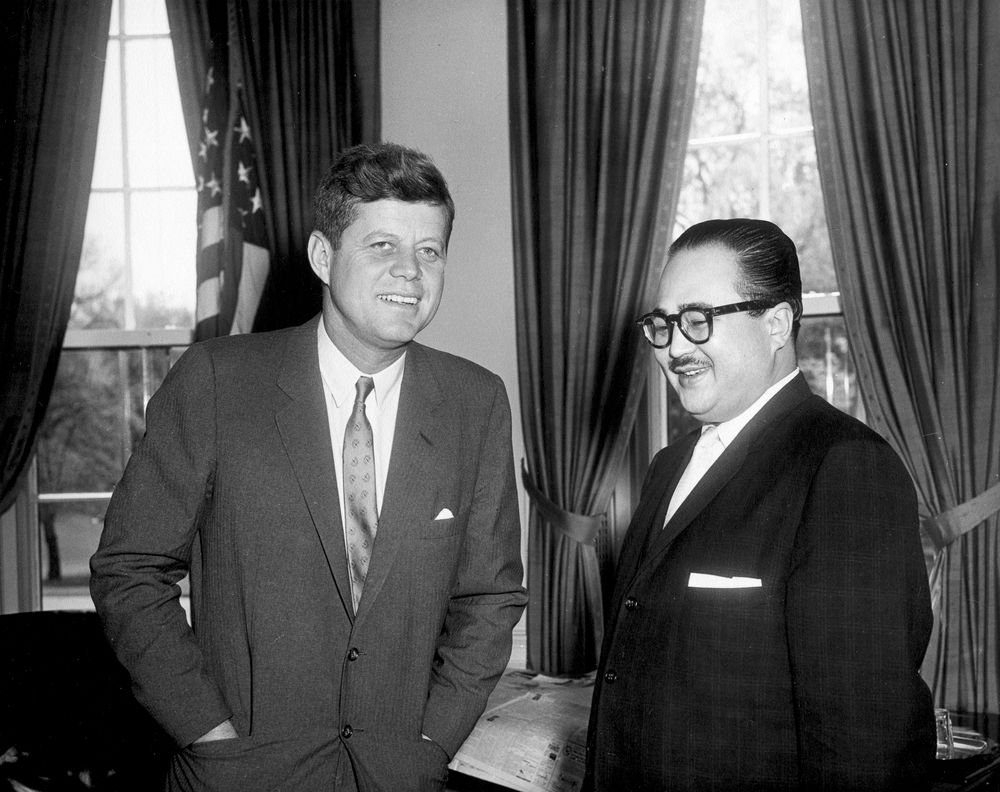
President John F. Kennedy Meets with Ambassador of Nepal Rishikesh Shah (Raja of Bhirkot)

#	Kingdom	Accede in Nepal	Dynasty of King
1	Salyan	1847	
2	Jajarkot	1843	
3	Bajhang	1848	Singh
4	Mustang	1846	Bista
5	Bhirkot	1842	
6	Darna	1847	
7	Bajura	1848	
8	Thalahara	1848	
9	Galkot	1842	
10	Gulmi	1861	Shah
11	Garaukot	1842	
12	Dullu	1846	Shah
13	Malneta	1846	Shah
14	Pyuthan	1842	
15	Parvat	1843	Bam Malla
16	Khumri	1843	

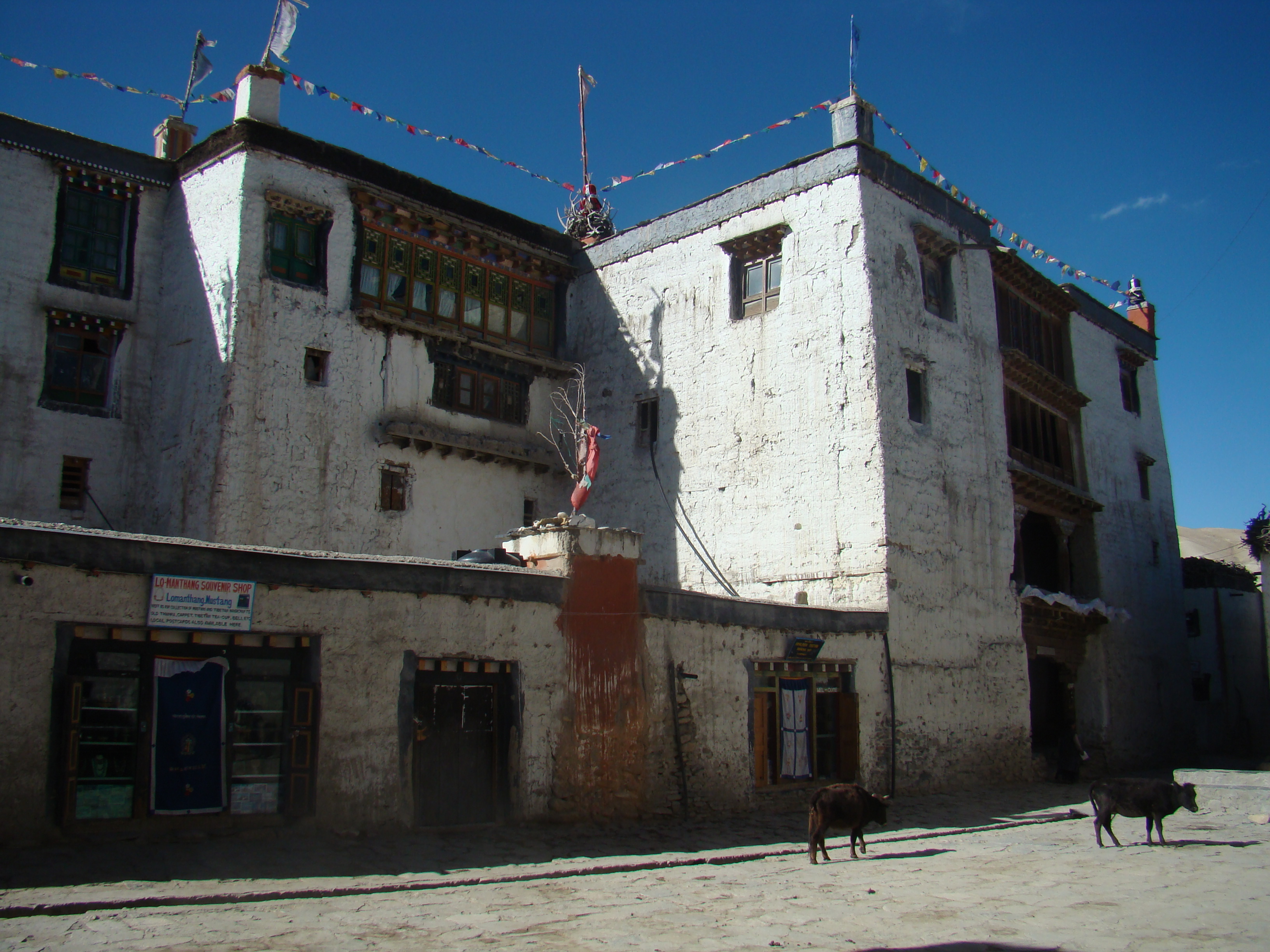
Lo Manthang Palace

== Powers and Functions ==
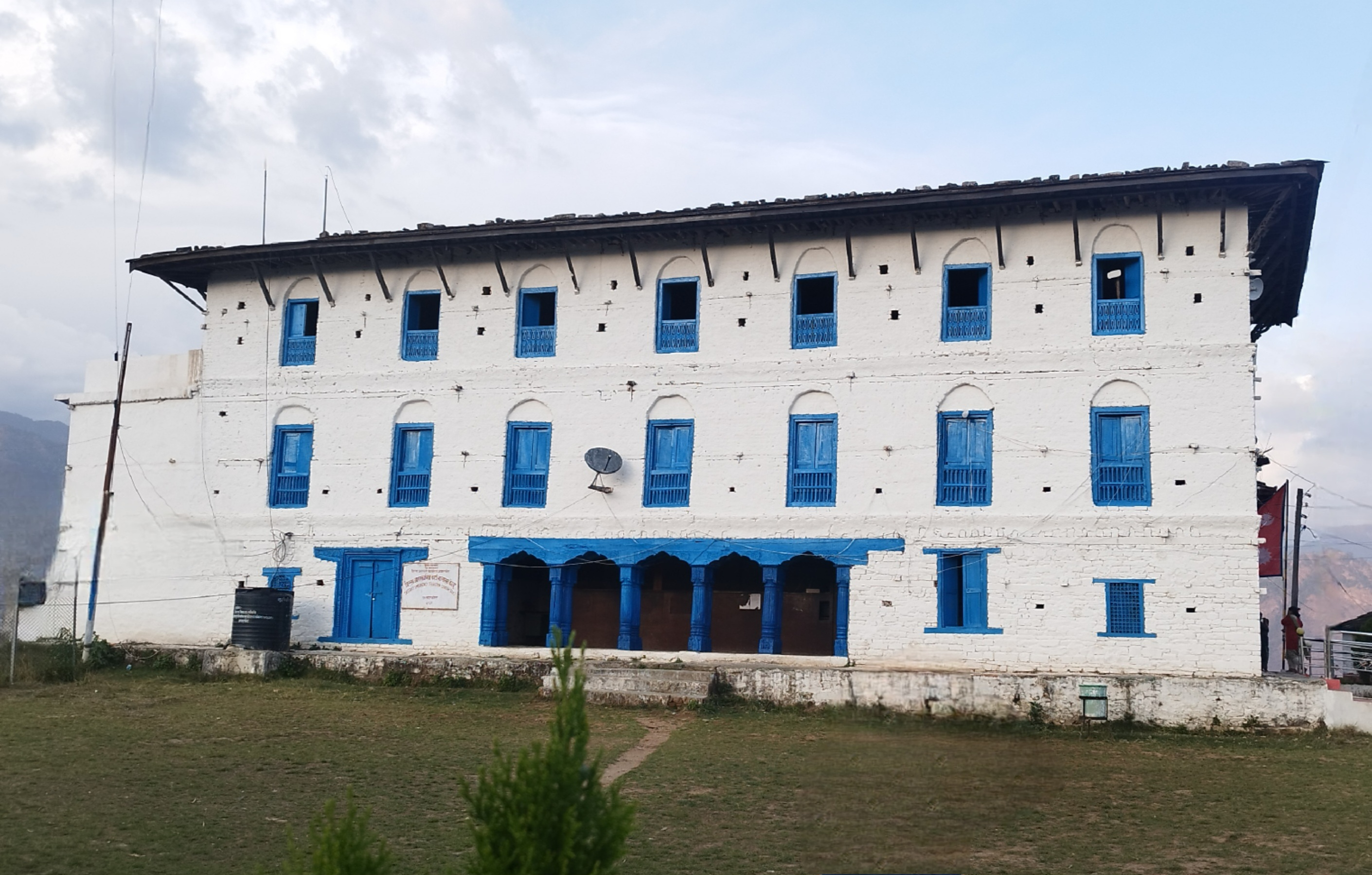
Jajarkot Palace

The principal traditional powers and functions of the vassal chiefs included administration of justice and the collection of revenues. The central government also granted them autonomy in matters like running day-to-day administration within the jurisdiction of their Rajyas. Since the available contemporary documents do not throw much light on this last point, the judicial 'and revenue collection functions of the vassal chiefs demand spеcial treatment.

=== Judicial ===
The vassal chiefs possessed powers to hear and decide original cases that came from the people living inside their Rajyas. While deciding cases they had to follow the provisions of the Ain (Legal Code) enforced by the central government. But their power to decide major cases was severely limited. Thus they were not allowed to decide penal cases that fell within the ambit of Pancha Khat, i.e., slaying a Brahmin, killing of cow, killing of a woman, killing of a child, and unlawful sexual intercourse, such as incest. In other words, the vassal chiefs could not decide cases of serious nature which carried capital punishment, branding, shaving, and the like.

Appeals against the decisions of the chiefs lay either in the nearest district law court or in the district governor, known as Hakim. Likewise, complaints regarding the injustice meted out by the chiefs to their subjects were heard by the district law court or the district governor.

=== Revenue Collection ===
Royal charters given to the vassal states at the times of their acceptance of Gorkhali overlordship confirmed the rights aud privileges of the chiefs to grant Birta lands to private individuals and to enjoy tax-exempt land revenues for themselves. Their rights to grant lands to religious, guthi and philanthropic institutions were also confirmed. Chiefs who farmed land revenues on Thekka or contract were, however, required to pay land-taxes like Serma and Pota, along with the stipulated amount mentioned in the contract.

Chiefs of all categories could cultivate waste or barren lands and enjoy the revenues of such lands for themselves.

The vassal chiefs held the lands of Jagirdars (civil and military personnels who received lands as Jagir, in lieu of cash payment) on Thekka or contract. After paying the stipulated amount to the Jagirdars, the balance was appropriated by themselves. Revenues collected by the chiefs on the part of the central government were deposited in the district revenue office, called Mal.

If the lands of the central government and its employees (Jagirdars) were farmed, probably you are using the term technically. Is so, explain the chiefs were held responsible for the maintenance of water-channels and the improvement of irrigational facilities. They received complaints from the ryots (tenants) and recommended the government for remissions of land taxes, if the harvest was damaged following drought and other natural calamities.

In addition to the collection of land revenues, the vassal chiefs collected and forwarded levies, fees, and taxes, like Chumawan, Gadimubarak, Goddhuwa, Kascharai, etc., to the central government.

=== Revoking of Title "Raja" ===
On the following circumstances in which the title "Raja" of vassal chief can be revoked:

- If renounces the Hindu religion.
- If becomes a foreign citizen.
- If marries a foreigner without permission.
- If Shree Panch feels that he has committed bad conduct.
- If he acts against the State Revenue Act/Regulations.

== See also ==
- Princely state
- Flags of Indian princely states
- Political integration of India
- List of princely states of British India (by region)
- List of Indian monarchs
- Praja Mandal
- Salute state
- Indian feudalism
- Indian honorifics
- Ghatwals and Mulraiyats
- Jagirdar
- List of Maratha dynasties and states
- List of Rajput dynasties and states
- Maratha Empire
- List of Jat dynasties and states
- Oudh Bequest
- Rajputana
- Zamindar
