= Thirbam Malla =

Nepalese revolutionary and military commander (1924–1950)

Thir Bam Malla
- थीर बम मल्ल
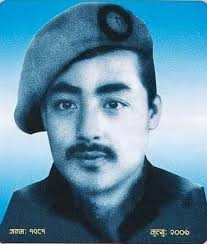
- Thir Bam Malla
- Born: 1924; Nepal
- Died: 11 November 1950; Raxaul, Bihar, India
- Education: Tri-Chandra College; military training in Dehradun
- Relatives: Bharat Bam Malla (father); Chaitanya Rajya Laxmi Rana (mother); Subarna Shumsher Rana (maternal uncle)
- Military career
- Allegiance: Nepali Congress
- Branch: Congress Liberation Army (Mukti Sena)
- Commands: Birgunj revolutionary forces (1950)
- Known for: Commanding the Birgunj operation during the 1950 Nepalese revolution
- Conflicts: 1950–1951 Nepalese revolution

Thir Bam Malla (Nepali: थीर बम मल्ल; 1924 – 11 November 1950) was a Nepalese revolutionary and military commander who participated in the 1950–1951 Nepalese revolution against the hereditary rule of the Rana dynasty. A member of the royal family of Galkot, he joined the Nepali Congress' armed revolutionary organization, the Mukti Sena (Liberation Army), and commanded forces during the capture of Birgunj in November 1950. He was fatally shot during the operation, becoming one of the earliest casualties of the armed uprising.

Prior to the uprising, Malla had received military training in India and participated in efforts to obtain weapons from Burma. His involvement in the revolution placed him among the military figures associated with the campaign that contributed to the end of Rana rule in February 1951.

== Early life and family background ==
Malla was born in 1924 as a prince of the Kingdom of Galkot, a former principality historically associated with the Chaubisi principalities of western Nepal. He was the second son of Bharat Bam Malla, the last hereditary ruler of Galkot, and Chaitanya Rajya Laxmi Rana, who is also identified in published accounts as Chaitanya Rajeshwari. As a member of Galkot's ruling Malla dynasty, he belonged to one of the hereditary royal families of western Nepal.

His mother was reportedly a daughter of Hiranya Shumsher Rana, a son of Bhim Shumsher Jung Bahadur Rana, who served as Nepal's prime minister from 1929 to 1932. Through this maternal relationship, Malla was a nephew of Subarna Shumsher Rana, a prominent political leader and financial supporter of the anti-Rana movement.

The Malla family maintained historical connections with both the former ruling houses of western Nepal and the Rana political establishment. Despite these connections, members of the family became involved in the movement for democratic government. Bharat Bam Malla was associated with the Nepali Congress and later entered parliamentary politics following the end of Rana rule.

Malla's elder brother, Laxman Bam Malla, was also involved in the revolution. According to accounts of the period, Laxman participated in revolutionary activities in the Bhairahawa region under the leadership of K. I. Singh.

Accounts differ regarding Malla's birthplace. Some identify Kathmandu as his place of birth and Galkot as the location of his childhood, while others state that he was born in Galkot and subsequently raised in Kathmandu. Both locations were closely associated with his early life.

== Education and military training ==
Malla received his higher education at Tri-Chandra College in Kathmandu, where he completed the Intermediate of Science (I.Sc.) course. He subsequently travelled to Dehradun, India, for military education.

At the time, opportunities for Nepalese students to receive formal military training abroad were limited, and the Rana government generally selected individuals for government-sponsored military education. According to regional historical reporting, Malla pursued his training in Dehradun through his own initiative and at his own expense rather than through a government-sponsored appointment.

He underwent military instruction that included officer-level training. His education in India subsequently became relevant to the Nepali Congress' preparations for an armed campaign, during which the revolutionary leadership sought individuals familiar with military organization and weapons.

While Malla was completing his training, political opposition to the Rana administration was intensifying. The Nepali Congress was preparing an armed campaign against the government, and several of its senior leaders were organizing political and military activities from India.

After completing his military studies, Malla became involved in the revolutionary preparations. His maternal relationship with Subarna Shumsher Rana and his connections with other Nepali Congress leaders helped bring him into the movement. Family accounts cited in Nepalese reporting also identify his father as an influence on his political outlook.

== Role in the 1950 Nepalese revolution ==
=== Political background ===
The Rana dynasty had exercised hereditary executive power in Nepal since 1846. By the late 1940s, opposition to Rana rule had grown among political activists, exiled Nepalese leaders and reform-minded members of the country's political establishment.

In April 1950, the Nepal National Congress and the Nepal Democratic Congress merged to form the Nepali Congress. Among its leading figures were B. P. Koirala, Matrika Prasad Koirala and Subarna Shumsher Rana. The organization adopted an armed strategy after its leadership concluded that political agitation alone would be insufficient to bring about the transfer of power.

The movement's military preparations were undertaken largely from Indian territory. The revolutionary organization, commonly known as the Mukti Sena, included former soldiers, politically active volunteers and individuals with military training. The Nepali Congress sought to acquire weapons, establish command arrangements and coordinate operations against government positions inside Nepal.

Malla became involved in these preparations as a militarily trained member of the revolutionary organization.

=== Mission to Burma ===
One of Malla's earliest documented assignments was his participation in a mission to secure weapons for the planned uprising.

The Nepali Congress faced significant difficulties obtaining arms in India, where the government of Prime Minister Jawaharlal Nehru discouraged an armed insurrection against the Rana administration. Revolutionary leaders consequently explored alternative sources of military supplies, including contacts with socialist political figures in Burma.

B. P. Koirala established contacts with Burmese socialist officials through Indian socialist leaders, including Jayaprakash Narayan and Ram Manohar Lohia. The Burmese representatives indicated their willingness to provide arms but expected the Nepalese revolutionaries to arrange transportation.

According to Koirala's memoir Atmabrittanta, the Burmese representatives requested that the Nepali Congress send someone with knowledge of military equipment. Malla, who had recently completed his training in Dehradun, was selected for the assignment and accompanied by Indian socialist activist Bhola Chatterji.

Chatterji's account, cited by writer Amish Raj Mulmi in The Wire, records that he and Malla arrived in Rangoon on 10 August 1950. During the mission, Chatterji held discussions with Burmese socialist officials concerning the supply of weapons for the revolution.

The Burmese authorities eventually agreed to provide arms, while responsibility for transporting the equipment remained with the revolutionary organizers. The subsequent operation involved arrangements for aircraft transportation through the assistance of Mahabir Shumsher Rana, whose aviation business operated in India.

Weapons obtained through these arrangements were transported to India and made available to the Nepali Congress' armed organization before the beginning of the uprising. The Burma mission became an important component of the movement's military preparations.

=== Preparations for the armed uprising ===
The Nepali Congress formally adopted the decision to undertake an armed struggle at the Bairgania Conference in September 1950. The party leadership subsequently prepared for coordinated attacks on government positions along the Nepal–India border.

The movement's plans included operations in Birgunj, Biratnagar, Bhairahawa and other strategically significant locations. These towns provided access to important routes, administrative offices and government installations.

The political situation became increasingly urgent in November when King Tribhuvan and members of the royal family sought refuge at the Indian Embassy in Kathmandu. The Nepali Congress leadership decided to begin military operations as the political crisis intensified.

Malla was assigned a leading role in the Birgunj operation. His forces were tasked with capturing government positions and establishing revolutionary control over the town, a commercially and strategically important location near the Indian border.

=== Capture of Birgunj ===
The attack on Birgunj began during the night of 10–11 November 1950. Revolutionary forces advanced from the direction of Raxaul, the Indian border town opposite Birgunj.

According to B. P. Koirala's account, the operation was led by Malla and Purna Singh, with Subarna Shumsher Rana exercising overall responsibility for the campaign. The attacking force targeted the residence of the local governor, government offices and other strategically important positions.

The revolutionaries encountered resistance at the governor's residence but succeeded in obtaining the surrender of the local administrator, Som Shumsher, whom Malla took prisoner. Other detachments secured government facilities and the treasury.

By the morning of 11 November, the Mukti Sena had captured much of Birgunj. The operation resulted in the acquisition of government arms, ammunition and a substantial quantity of money from the treasury.

In Atmabrittanta, Koirala recalled that the revolutionary forces obtained approximately 50 lakh rupees, 250 rifles and ammunition during the operation. The captured resources strengthened the revolutionaries' military and financial position at an early stage of the campaign.

Following the capture of the town, the revolutionaries announced a provisional administration in the territory under their control. The seizure of Birgunj became one of the earliest significant military successes of the 1950 uprising and received attention beyond Nepal.

=== Death ===
Malla was fatally shot on 11 November 1950, during the final stages of the Birgunj operation.

According to an account published in The Kathmandu Post, Malla was issuing instructions intended to maintain peace and public order after the revolutionary forces had secured important positions in the town. During this period, a Rana officer fired at him and fled the scene.

Other Nepalese accounts similarly describe Malla being shot after the capture of Birgunj, although they differ in details concerning the circumstances of the shooting. Some identify the assailant as a government agent who attacked while Malla was addressing the population.

Malla suffered a gunshot wound and was evacuated towards Raxaul for medical treatment. Accounts differ on whether he died while being transported or after reaching the hospital. He was 26 years old.

B. P. Koirala recalled that Malla's death was a serious loss to the revolutionary forces. Following the fighting, his body was taken to the banks of the Sirsiya River near the border, where he was cremated with military honours.

== Aftermath and historical significance ==
Although the Birgunj operation succeeded, revolutionary forces faced greater resistance at other locations, including Biratnagar and Bhairahawa. The fighting nevertheless demonstrated that the Rana administration could be challenged militarily and contributed to the growing political pressure on the government.

The revolution continued after Malla's death. Political negotiations involving the monarchy, the Rana government and the Nepali Congress ultimately led to a settlement in February 1951. The resulting political arrangement ended the Ranas' hereditary monopoly on executive power and established a coalition government under King Tribhuvan.

Malla's contribution has been discussed in both political histories and later commemorative accounts of the revolution. His involvement in the procurement of weapons from Burma and his command during the Birgunj offensive distinguish his role within the military preparations and early fighting of the movement.

Nepalese historical reporting has frequently identified him as the first martyr of the armed phase of the 1950 revolution.

== Legacy and commemoration ==
Malla is commemorated in Nepal as one of the figures associated with the struggle to establish democratic government.

Around 1952 (2009 BS), his parents, Bharat Bam Malla and Chaitanya Rajeshwari, established the Shahid Thirbam Library in Harichaur, Galkot, in his memory. The library subsequently experienced difficulties maintaining regular operations, particularly during Nepal's later period of armed conflict.

In 1996 (2053 BS), members of the Malla family established the Shahid Thirbam Malla Memorial Foundation. Based in Kathmandu, the foundation has supported educational activities, scholarships, school supplies and sporting programmes in the Galkot area.

Its activities have included assistance to schools in Harichaur and Hatiya, while the Nepal Badminton Association has organized a badminton tournament bearing Malla's name.

Malla's memory has also been preserved through public monuments and commemorative material. A statue of him stands in the Martyrs' Park in Baglung, alongside monuments to other figures associated with Nepal's democratic movement. A Nepalese commemorative postage stamp featuring him was also released in 2000.

The foundation and members of the Malla family have periodically called for greater public recognition of his historical role. Commemorative activities have continued particularly in Baglung District, where his family's association with Galkot remains part of the region's historical memory.
