= Kingdom of Rishing =

Former kingdom located in present-day Nepal

Kingdom of Rishing Nepali: ऋषिङ्ग
- Government: Monarchy
- Historical era: Chaubisi Rajyas
Succeeded by
Kingdom of Nepal
- Today part of: Nepal

The Kingdom of Rishing (Nepali: ऋषिङ्ग राज्य) was a petty kingdom in the confederation of 24 states known as Chaubisi Rajya. King of Tanahun, Hammar Sen, had controlled Rishing.
