= Kingdom of Palpa =

Former kingdom located in present-day Nepal

Kingdom of Palpa Nepali: पाल्पा
- Demonym: Palpali
- Government: Monarchy
- Historical era: Chaubisi Rajyas
Succeeded by
Kingdom of Nepal
- Today part of: Nepal

The Kingdom of Palpa (Nepali: पाल्पा राज्य) was a petty kingdom in the confederation of 24 states known as Chaubisi Rajya. Palpa became part of the Kingdom of Nepal after Prime Minister Bhimsen Thapa ordered the beheading of Prithivipal Sen, King of Palpa.

== History ==
Kingdom of Palpa was one of the most powerful kingdom in the Chaubisi rajya. It was also much bigger before Argha, Khanchi, and Gulmi seceded to become independent kingdoms.

Branches of the Sena dynasty that ruled Palpa also ruled Makawanpur and Tanahun. The Makawanpur branch further divided and created the kingdoms of Chaudandi and Vijayapur. The Chaudandi kingdom contained the present-day Nepal's Madhesh Province, and south-eastern regions of Bagmati Province. The Vijayapur kingdom contained the present-day Province No. 1.

In the early 18th century, the king of Palpa had submitted to the overlordship and protection to the nawabs of Oudh. However, during the late 18th century Oudh gradually became weaker, seeing Palpa lose an important protector and became more vulnerable to the neighboring Gorkha Kingdom and the British East India Company.
