= Jaya Prithvi Bahadur Singh =

Nepalese humanist and peace activist

H.H. Shree Tin Raja Sir Jaya Prithvi Bahadur Singh
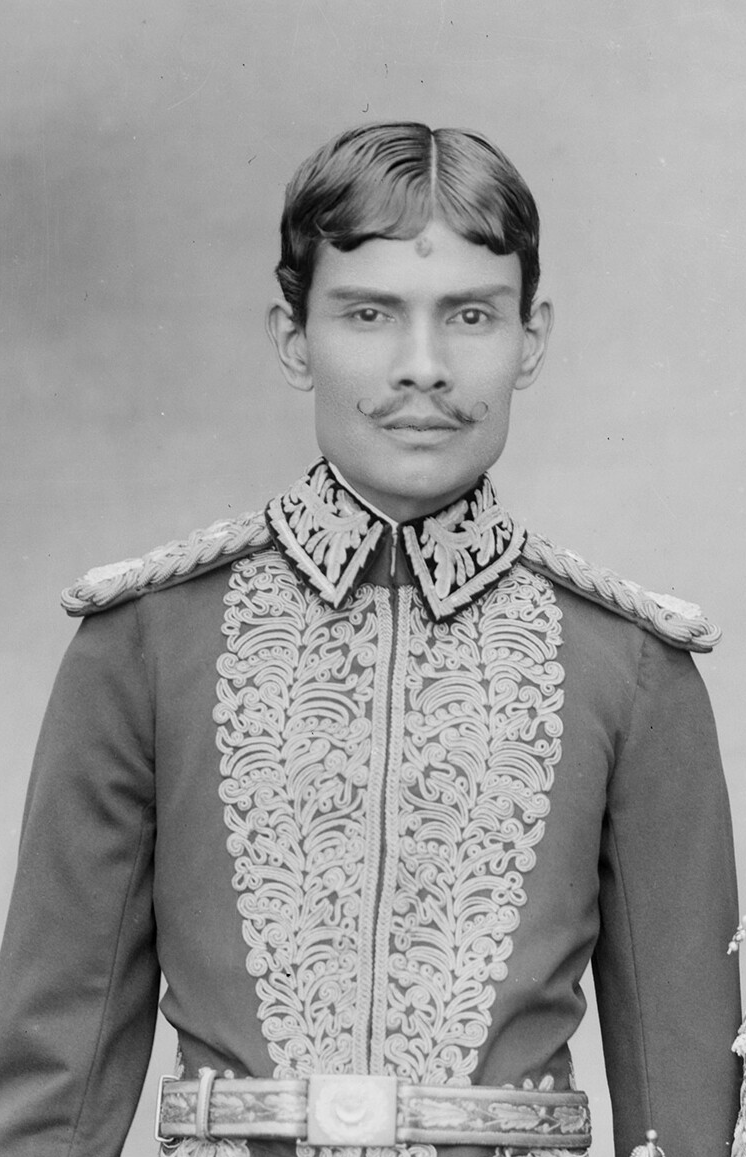
- Singh in the c. 1900s-1920s
- Born: 23 August 1877; Bajhang, Nepal
- Died: 15 October 1940 (aged 63); Bangalore, India
- Education: University of Calcutta
- Occupations: Humanist, writer, peace advocate, social activist, national hero
- Title: Raja of Bajhang
- Website: Humanism and Jai Prithvi Foundation

His Highness Raja Sri Teen Jaya Prithvi Bahadur Singh (23 August 1877 – 15 October 1940), was the Raja of the Nepali vassal Princely state of Bajhang. He was known as a humanist, peace advocate, writer and social activist from Nepal. He devoted his life to social welfare and world peace. He is known mainly for humanitarianism, peace advocacy and human rights advocacy for education. He also contributed to the development of education, literature, journalism and health.

== Early life and education ==
Raja Jaya Prithvi Bahadur Singh, the eldest son of Bajhangi King Bikram Bahadur Singh and Rani Rudra Kumari Singh (daughter of the then Prime Minister Jung Bahadur Rana) of Bajhang vassal State, was born on 20 August 1877 (7 Bhadra 1934 BS) in Chainpur, Bajhang.

Singh began his education when he was five years old. His creativity became obvious in his early childhood years, and consequently he was moved to the Thapathali Darbar School in Kathmandu at the age of eight. After completing his primary education he was admitted to Durbar High. Jaya Prithvi received his higher education from India. He matriculated from Calcutta University in 1895 and I.A. from Allahabad College in 1897. And graduated in law from the University of Calcutta in 1906.

== Career ==
After completing his studies, Singh established an Ayurvedic hospital for the local people. He established a system of giving Mohiyani Haq (law related to landownership) in the society. He constructed many roads and bridges for the facility of the people of the community. He established a primary school where poor children could get an education.

Singh's contributions to Education in Nepal is of great significance. He was one of those early educationists who paved the way of modern education in Nepal. In 1963 BS (1906–1907), he established Satyavadi Pathshala in his own palace at Naxal, Kathmandu. He himself wrote books for the school. His writing Aksharank Shiksha is considered the first textbook of Nepal. The school was aimed to provide administrative education to common Nepali people. As the Rana rulers were intolerant about education, he shifted the school to Bhopur of Bajhang just after four years.

Singh brought social reforms and wrote books on different subjects. He is considered "the first Nepalese to write Nepali-language grammar". He worked with one of the earliest Nepalese newspaper, Gorkhapatra. He played a key role in the management of Gorkhapatra in its early days. On 20 June 2022, the government of Nepal declared Jaya Prithvi Bahadur Singh as a national hero of nepal, who is also the latest person to be nominated as a national hero. At the same time, the number of National heroes of Nepal has reached 18.

== Exile ==
The authorities scrutinised his activities and Singh was forced to leave the country in 1891. He lived in exile in Bangalore and established The Humanity newspaper and the J.P. Institute. During the Italian invasion of Ethiopia, Singh volunteered to treat the war casualties and was imprisoned by the Italians. He was also imprisoned by the British for his involvement in the revolutionary movement in India.

== Personal life and death ==
He was married to Khageshwari Devi daughter of then Prime Minister Chandra Shumsher Jang Bahadur Rana. Since they were childless they adopted Shanti Kumari Singh. Shanti was Singh's niece through his brother Bir Jung Bahadur Singh. He died at the age of 63 on 15 October 1940 (1 Ashoj 1997 BS) in Bangalore.

Jaya Prithivi Journalist Award is established in his honour. The award is presented to journalist who have made a significant contribution to the journalism field.

== Gallery ==
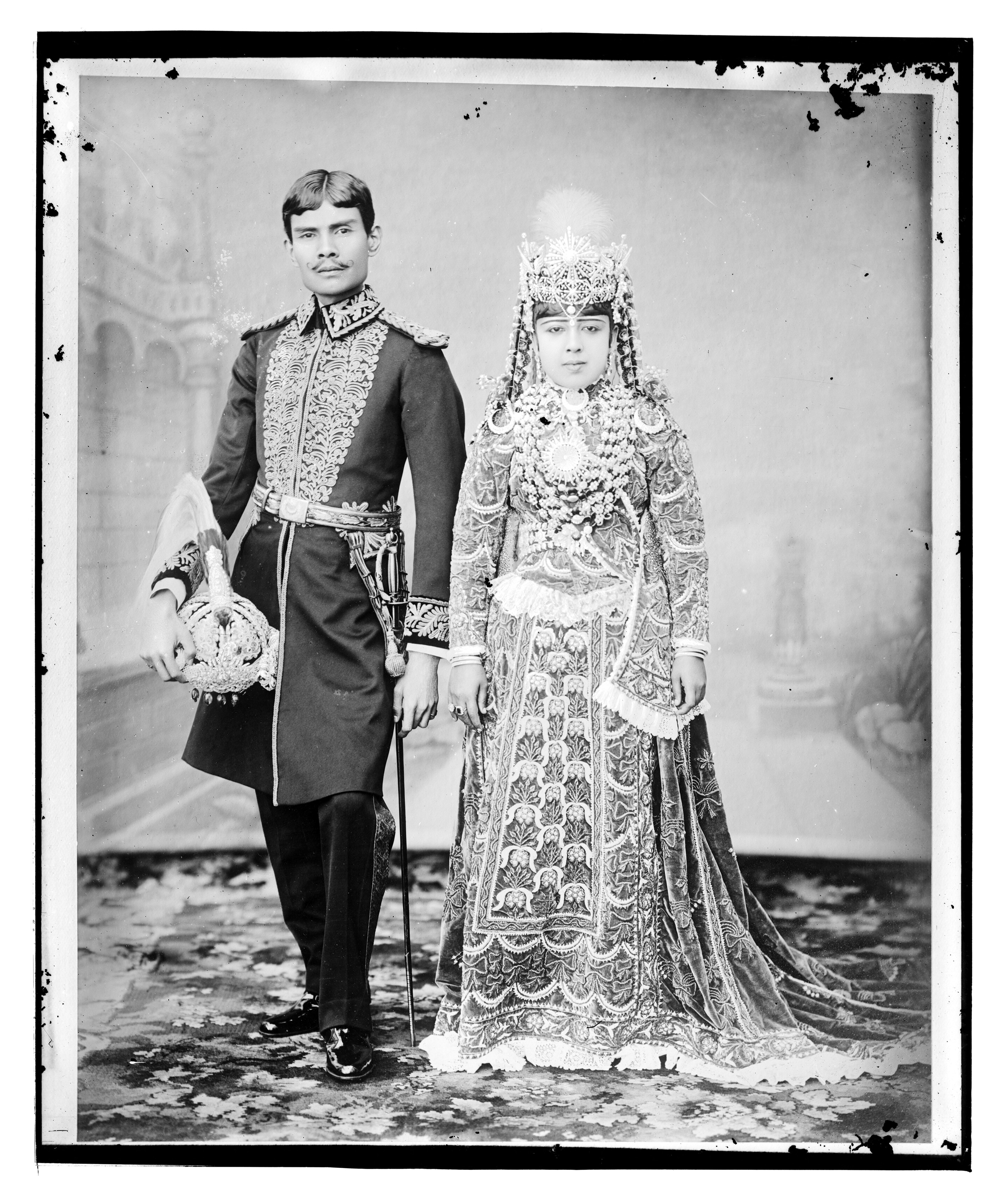
Singh with his wife, Khagaraja Divyeshwari Rajya Laxmi

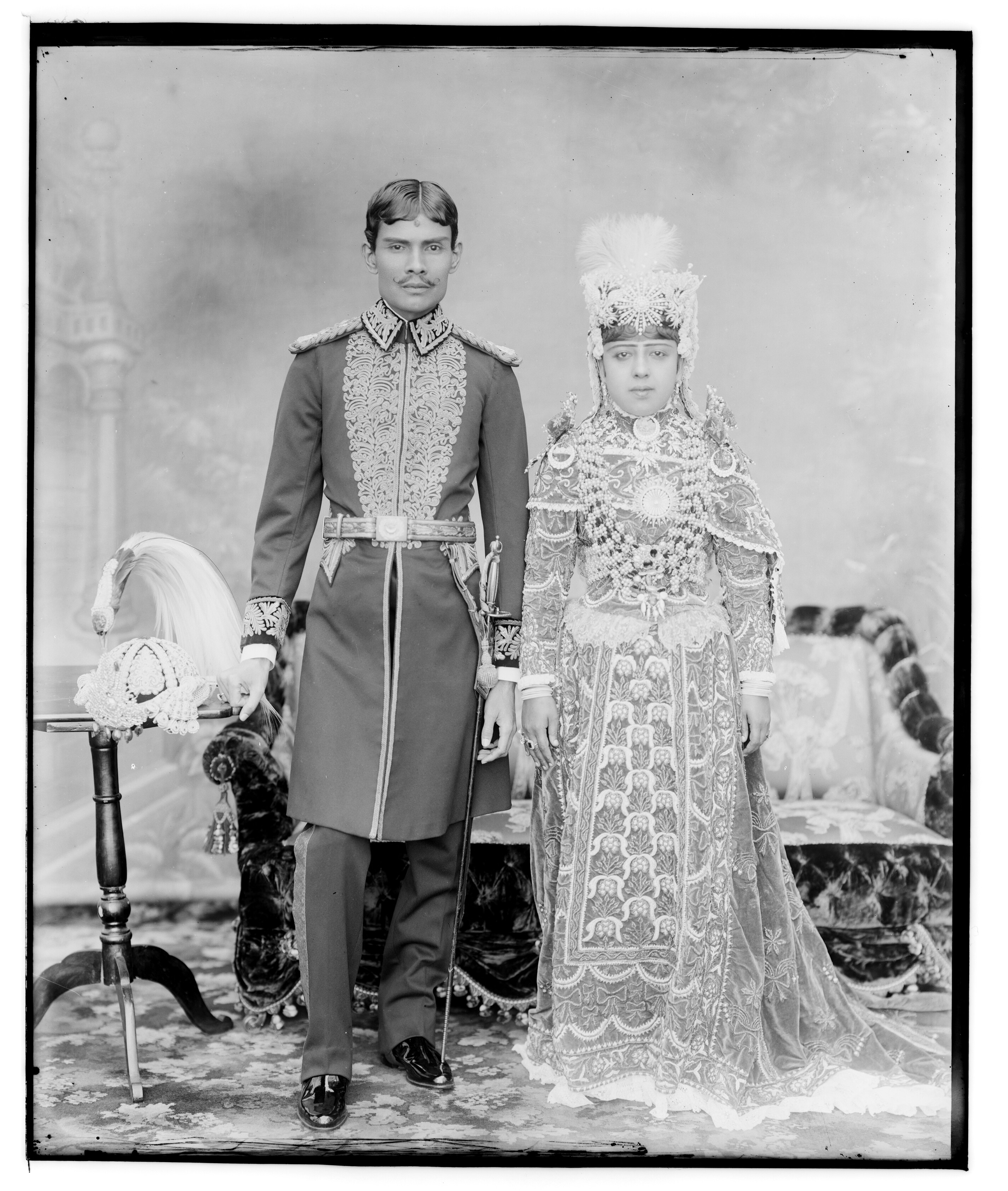
Singh with his wife, Khagaraja Divyeshwari Rajya Laxmi

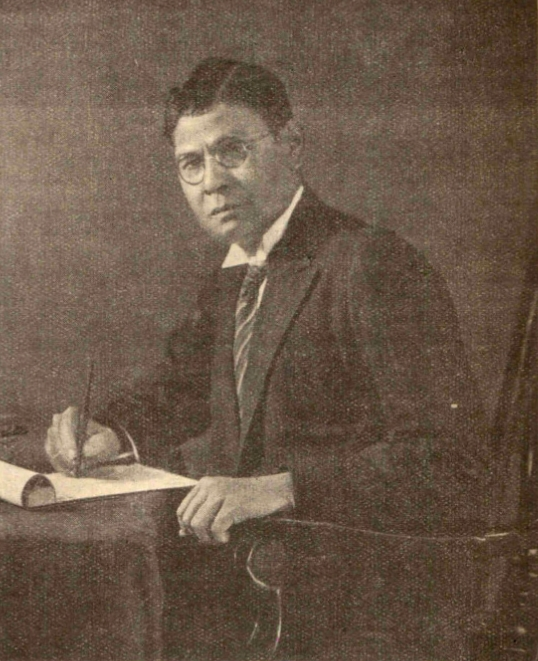
Singh in his writing desk

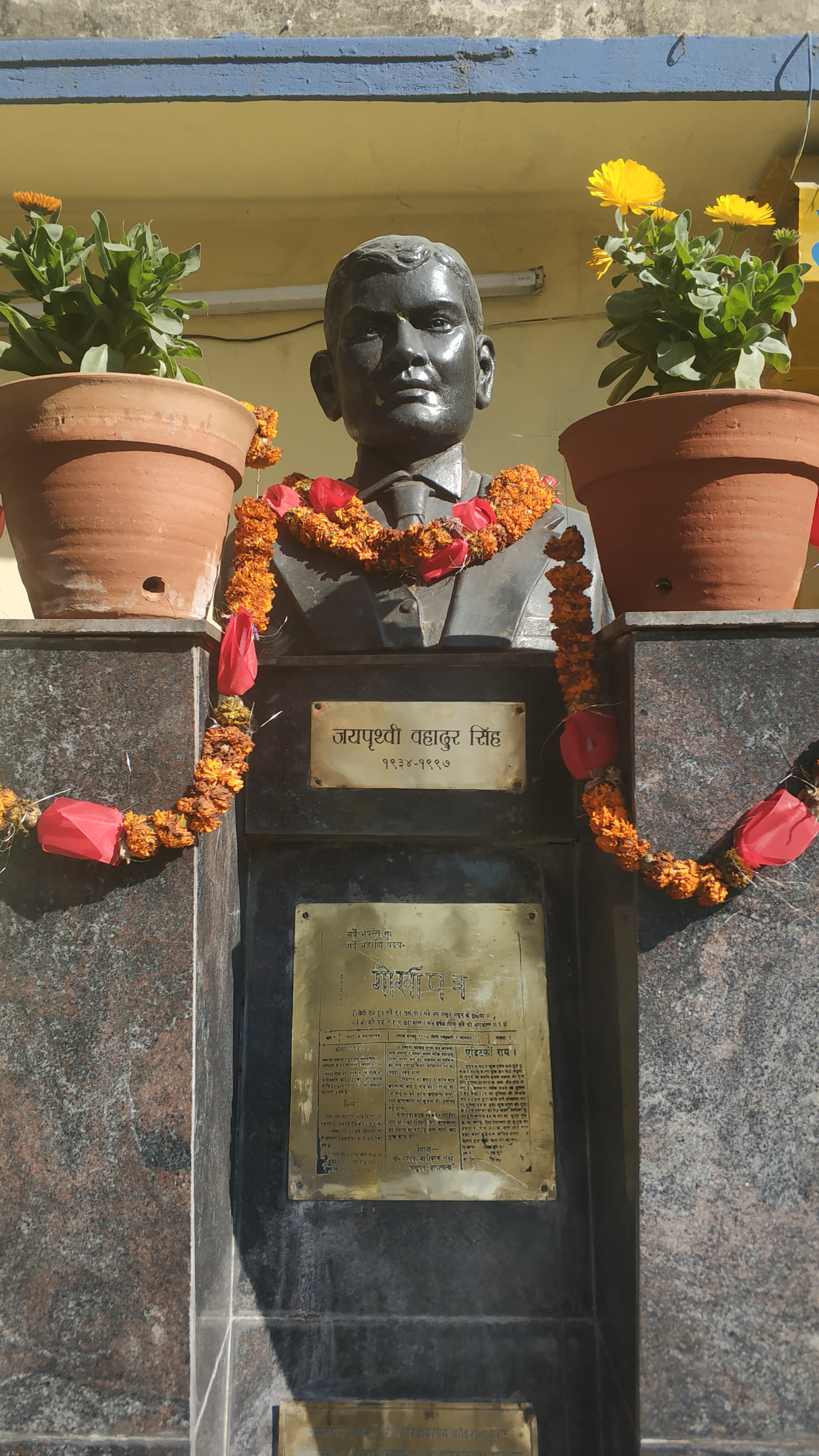
Statue of Singh in front of Gorkhapatra Corporation

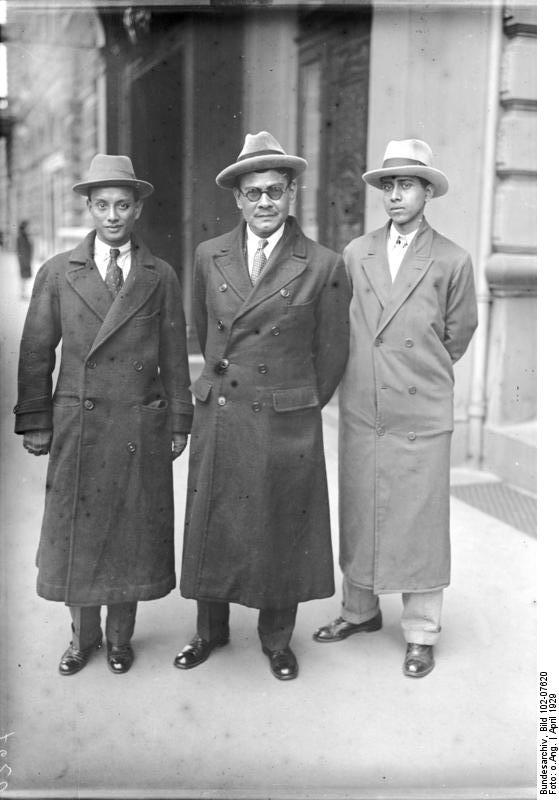
Singh (centre) in Berlin, on the way to attend the League of Nations Conference in Geneva.

== See also ==
- Rana Bahadur Shah
- Bahadur Shah
- Prithivi Narayan Shah
