= Dullu Palace =

Administrative centre of Dullu Kingdom in ancient Nepal

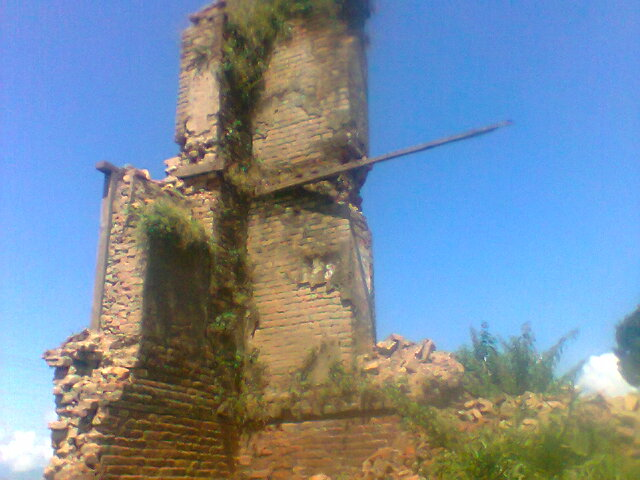
- Ruins of the palace

General information
- Type: Palace
- Location: Dailekh, Nepal
- Completed: 1453 BS (1396-1397)
- Destroyed: April 2002

Dullu Palace (Nepali: दुल्लु दरबार) used to be the administrative centre of Dullu Kingdom in ancient Nepal. It is located in Dailekh district of western Nepal. In April 2002 (29 Baisakh 2059 BS) Maoist bombarded the palace. Currently, the ruins of the palace exist in the current spot. The local government is trying to find funds to renovate the palace and convert the place into a tourist attraction.

== History ==
The palace was built by king Sansari Bamm as the administrative centre of Dullu-Sinja kingdom in 1453 BS (1396–1397). It was the winter palace; the summer palace was in Sinjakot in Jumla. In the reign of Uttim Shahi, in 1943 BS (1886–1887), Amar Singh Thapa annexed it into the Gorkha kingdom. However, the son of Uttim, Rudra Shahi was allowed to rule under the Gorkha Kingdom. After the unification of Nepal, Prithvi Narayan Shah ruled the Dullu Kingdom. Then after, Rudra Shahi, Shree Bhakta Bahadur Shahi and Janga Bahadur Shahi became the king of Dullu.

After the Raja Rajauta Unmulan Ain was enacted in 2018 BS, the land where the palace was distributed to 11 proponents. However, no one has claimed the palace. Due to the dispute, the National Archaeology department has not renovated the palace.

== Architecture ==
The palace was built by carpenters from Kathmandu. It was built with baked bricks and tilled roof. It had 18 rooms and 36 carved wooden windows. There is a temple of Hindu goddess Kali near the palace. In Dashain, pilgrims come to the temple to sacrifice animals. There are some stone inscription in Devnagari Script dating back to 1354.
