= Princess Shova Shahi of Nepal =

Princess Shova Shahi
- Princess of Nepal
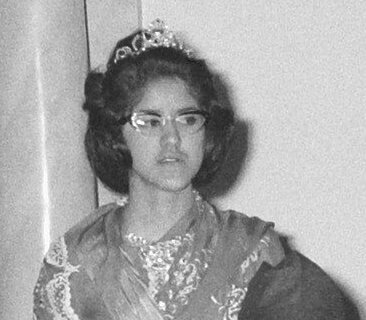
- Princess Shova in 1967
- Born: 17 January 1949 (age 77); Narayanhity Royal Palace, Kathmandu, Nepal
- Spouse: Kumar Mohan Bahadur Shahi (m. 1970)
- Issue: Himvan Shahi; Manuja Shah
Names
- Shova Rajya Lakshmi Devi Shahi
- House: Shah dynasty (by birth)
- Father: Mahendra of Nepal
- Mother: Indra Rajya Lakshmi Devi
- Religion: Hindu

Princess Shova Shahi of Nepal or Shova Rajya Lakshmi Devi Shahi (born 17 January 1949) is a Princess of Nepal as the youngest daughter of King Mahendra of Nepal. She is the only surviving daughter of King Mahendra: her older sisters Princess Shanti and Princess Sharada were murdered during the Nepalese royal massacre along with King Birendra Bir Bikram Shah Dev and his family.

The name Shobha/Shova means "grace" or "splendor".

== Life ==
Princess Shova was born in Kathmandu, the fifth child and youngest daughter of King Mahendra and his first wife, Crown Princess Indra.

She was educated at the Loreto Convent, Darjeeling.

In 1970, she married Kumar Mohan Bahadur Shahi, a descendant of the ruling families of Rukumkot, Jumla and Jajarkot. He is a former national Badminton player of Nepal.

They had two children, a son and a daughter:

- Himvan Shahi. Married and have one son;
  - Vignajeet Shahi.
- Manuja Shah (née Shahi). Married and have two daughters;
  - Rayaki Shah.
  - Manushree Shah.

On June 1, 2001, ten members of the Nepalese royal family were murdered, reportedly by an unknown murderer. The murderer first shot King Birendra. The wounded king wanted to pick up the weapon that the murderer had left behind, in an attempt to stop the massacre, but the king was stopped. She pulled out the magazine. However, the murderer had several other weapons in his possession. The massacre resulted in the deaths of ten royals including the Crown Prince. Princess Shova was wounded but survived.

In 2008, the monarchy in Nepal was abolished. Currently, Princess Shova and her brother, the former king Gyanendra, are the only remaining children of King Mahendra.

== Patronages ==
- Member of the Nepalese Red Cross Society.

== Honours ==
National Honours

- Member of the Order of Gorkha Dakshina Bahu, 1st class (13 April 1972).
- Member of the Order of Three Divine Powers, 1st class (23 October 2001).
- King Mahendra Investiture Medal (2 May 1956).
- Ati Subikhyata Sewalankar [Renowned Service Medal] (1968).
- Vishesh Sewa [Distinguished Service Medal] (1970).
- King Birendra Investiture Medal (24 February 1975).
- Commemorative Silver Jubilee Medal of King Birendra (31 January 1997).
- King Gyanendra Investiture Medal (4 June 2001).

Foreign honours

- (Netherlands) : Dame Grand Cross of the Order of the House of Orange (25 April 1967).
- (Japan) : Dame Grand Cordon of the Order of the Precious Crown (16 May 1978).
