= Kingdom of Garahun =

Former kingdom located in present-day Nepal

Kingdom of Garahun Nepali: गरहुन
- Government: Monarchy
- Historical era: Chaubisi Rajyas
Succeeded by
Kingdom of Nepal
- Today part of: Nepal

The Kingdom of Garahun (Nepali: गरहुन राज्य) was a petty kingdom in the confederation of 24 states known as Chaubisi Rajya.
