= Kingdom of Nuwakot =

Former kingdom located in present-day Nepal

Kingdom of Nuwakot Nepali: नुवाकोट
- Government: Monarchy
- Historical era: Chaubisi Rajyas
Succeeded by
Kingdom of Nepal
- Today part of: Syangja District, Nepal

The Kingdom of Nuwakot (Nepali: नुवाकोट राज्य) was a petty kingdom in the confederation of 24 states known as Chaubisi Rajya.
