= Kingdom of Dhor =

Former kingdom located in present-day Nepal

Kingdom of Dhor Nepali: धोर
- Government: Monarchy
- Historical era: Chaubisi Rajyas
Succeeded by
Kingdom of Nepal
- Today part of: Nepal

The Kingdom of Dhor (Nepali: धोर राज्य) was a petty kingdom in the confederation of 24 states known as Chaubisi Rajya. Dhor was annexed by the Kingdom of Nepal after their king supported the King of Parbat.
