= Kingdom of Pyuthan =

Former kingdom located in present-day Nepal

Kingdom of Pyuthan Nepali: प्युठान
- Government: Monarchy
- Historical era: Chaubisi Rajyas
Succeeded by
Kingdom of Nepal
- Today part of: Nepal

The Kingdom of Pyuthan (Nepali: प्युठान राज्य) was a petty kingdom in the confederation of 24 states known as Chaubisi Rajya.
