= Kingdom of Musikot =

Former kingdom located in present-day Nepal

Kingdom of Musikot Nepali: मुसिकोट
- Government: Monarchy
- Historical era: Chaubisi Rajyas
Succeeded by
Kingdom of Nepal
- Today part of: Nepal

The Kingdom of Musikot (Nepali: मुसिकोट राज्य) was a petty kingdom in the confederation of 24 states known as Chaubisi Rajya. Around 1787, Musikot was attacked by Damodar Pande who won the war subsequently it became part of the Kingdom of Nepal.
