= Kingdom of Gulmi =

Former kingdom located in present-day Nepal

Kingdom of Gulmi Nepali: गुल्मी
- Government: Monarchy
- Historical era: Chaubisi Rajyas
Succeeded by
Kingdom of Nepal
- Today part of: Nepal

The Kingdom of Gulmi (Nepali: गुल्मी राज्य) was a petty kingdom in the confederation of 24 states known as Chaubisi Rajya. Gulmi was part of the Kingdom of Palpa before it became an independent kingdom, and later became part of Nepal in 1806.

== List of Kings ==
#	Name	Reign	Notes	Ref.
1	Rana keshar kaucha Rana Dhanpati keshar kaucha Rana			
