= Loreto Convent, Darjeeling =

Loreto Convent Darjeeling
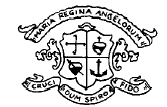

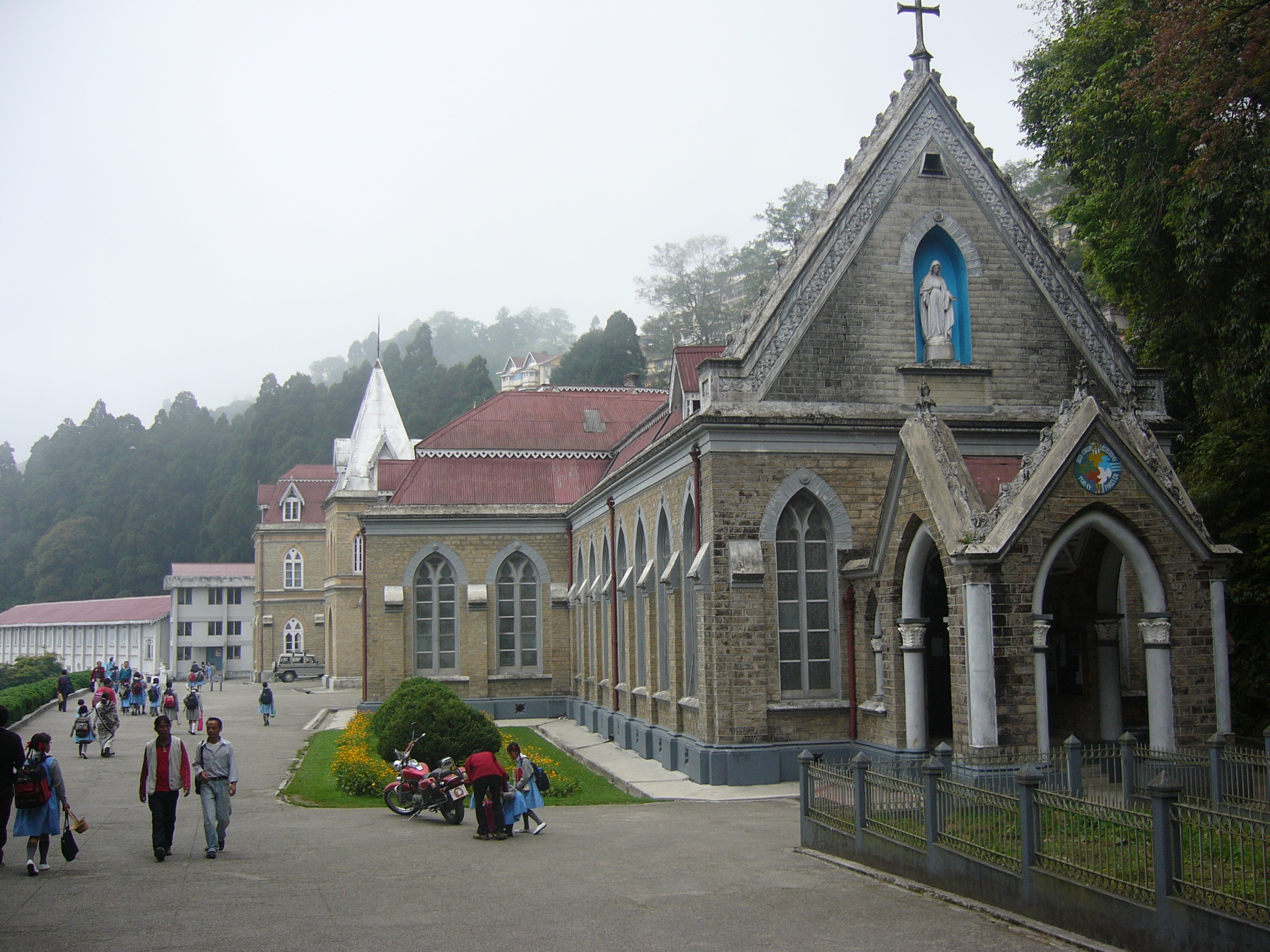
- Darjeeling, West Bengal; India

Information
- Type: Private
- Motto: Maria Regina Angelorum Cruci Dum Spiro Fido (Mary, Queen of the Angels. As long as I live I put my faith in Christ who died for me.)
- Established: 1846; 180 years ago
- Founder: Sisters of Loreto
- Principal: Sr. S.Punita
- Enrolment: 1600–1700
- Campus: Urban
- Website: Official Site

Loreto Convent is an English-medium girls' primary and secondary school located in Chauk Bazar, Darjeeling, West Bengal, India. It is run by Loreto Education Society of Darjeeling. The school is affiliated to the ICSE and ISC boards of Delhi.

== History ==
The Loreto Sisters came to India in 1841 at the invitation of the then Archbishop of Calcutta, Dr. Carew. The school was established during the British Raj by a group of Sisters of Loreto at 1846 to begin their work of 'quality education'. with the assistance of some lay gentlemen the land arrangements were made. Two choir sisters and a lay Sister with their chaplain came to start on 2 October 1846, Loreto House Branch Boarding and Day School. The party consisted of Mother Teresa Mons, Superioress, Mother Mary de Chantel Kelly with two novices. They were accompanied by Fr. John McGirr.

The Sisters began with two students, Miss Ryves and Miss Emma Moran. The sisters moved from their first residence "Snowy View" to the new Convent building on 1 May 1847 and the school building was added in 1853 which had particularly large playgrounds. The sisters continued their work of education under Bishop Carew but in 1848 they were brought under the Vicariate of Patna and Bishop Hartman. The Capuchin Ecclesiastical Superior paid his visit to the convent in April 1848. This brought Loreto Convent to a new phase where it ceased to be connected with the parent house in Calcutta- this state of things lasted till 1881. The girls were getting quality education and were proficient in English, French and had a good taste for music and drawing. The numbers went up slowly, in 1852 there were 19 pupils and in 1855 there were 30 pupils. By 1875, there were 107 and by the Golden Jubilee year, there were 173 pupils.

The convent also had a small orphanage for mainly soldiers' children which existed till 1887 when the orphans were transferred to Calcutta, i.e., Entally. In 1903, a new concert hall was built. In the same year, a new Novitiate was canonically erected and the novices came from Asansol in 1904. Mother Antoinette played a major role in the lives of the soldiers' and nurses during the World War II as they were housed in the Novitiate building. To keep in step with the educational developments, the Cambridge examinations were introduced in Darjeeling (1905) and the first three candidates presented were successful. From the turn of the century, the number of boarders grew and by 1917, there were 211 students out of which 117 were boarders.

By 1926, Arthur Forbes of Purnea had set up a line of fine buildings as the children began to grow in numbers. The dining room, dressing rooms, the skating rink and the Lytton hospital were completed. the school expanded and developed and provided holistic education. The hostel was the home of children for many South-Asian children and those from Calcutta, Purnea and other places.

In 1988, the school hostel was forced to relocate due to the threats of agitation. Loreto is presently a neighborhood school with 1600 pupils from every strata of society with the same benefits of "all round education".

== Notable alumni ==
- Sri Aurobindo (1872–1950), Indian nationalist, scholar, poet, mystic, evolutionary philosopher, yogi and guru
- Vivien Leigh (1913–1967), British two-time Oscar-winning film and stage actress
- Leila Seth (1930–2017), first female Chief Justice of an Indian state
- Princess Shanti Singh of Nepal (1941–2001)
- Princess Sharada Shah of Nepal (1943–2001)
- Princess Shobha Shahi of Nepal (born 1949)
- Princess Jayanti Shah of Nepal (1946–2001)
- Jetsun Pema (born 1940), activist, sister of the 14th Dalai Lama

== See also ==
- List of schools in West Bengal
