= Salyan =

Salyan may refer to:

== Places ==
=== Azerbaijan ===
- Salyan District (Azerbaijan), a district of Azerbaijan
- Salyan, Azerbaijan, capital of the Salyan rayon (district)
- Shirvan-Salyan economic region, an economic region of Azerbaijan

=== Nepal ===
- Salyan District, Nepal, a district of Nepal
- Salyan Khalanga, the headquarters of Salyan District
- Salyan, Baglung, a village development committee
- Salyan, Kaski, a town and village development committee
- Salyan, Solukhumbu, a village development committee
- Salyan 1 (constituency), Nepali parliamentary constituency

=== Russia ===
- Salyan, Republic of Dagestan

== Sports ==
- FK Mughan Salyan, Azerbaijani football team
- Plastik Salyan FK, Azerbaijani football team
- Salyan Olympic Sport Complex Stadium, Azerbaijani sport complex
