= Kingdom of Bhirkot =

Former kingdom located in present-day Nepal

Kingdom of Bhirkot Nepali: भिरकोट
- Government: Monarchy
- Historical era: Chaubisi Rajyas
| Succeeded by |
| Kingdom of Nepal |
- Today part of: Nepal

The Kingdom of Bhirkot (Nepali: भिरकोट राज्य) was a petty kingdom in the confederation of 24 states known as Chaubisi Rajya. The Kingdom of Gorkha's royal family were related to Kings of Bhirkot by agnatic seniority. During the reign of Mughal emperor Akbar, Bhupal Rana, fled to Bhirkot after he was chased by Muslims.
