= Kingdom of Dhurkot =

Former kingdom located in present-day Nepal

Kingdom of Dhurkot Nepali: धुर्कोट
- Government: Monarchy
- Historical era: Chaubisi Rajyas
| Succeeded by |
| Kingdom of Nepal |
- Today part of: Nepal

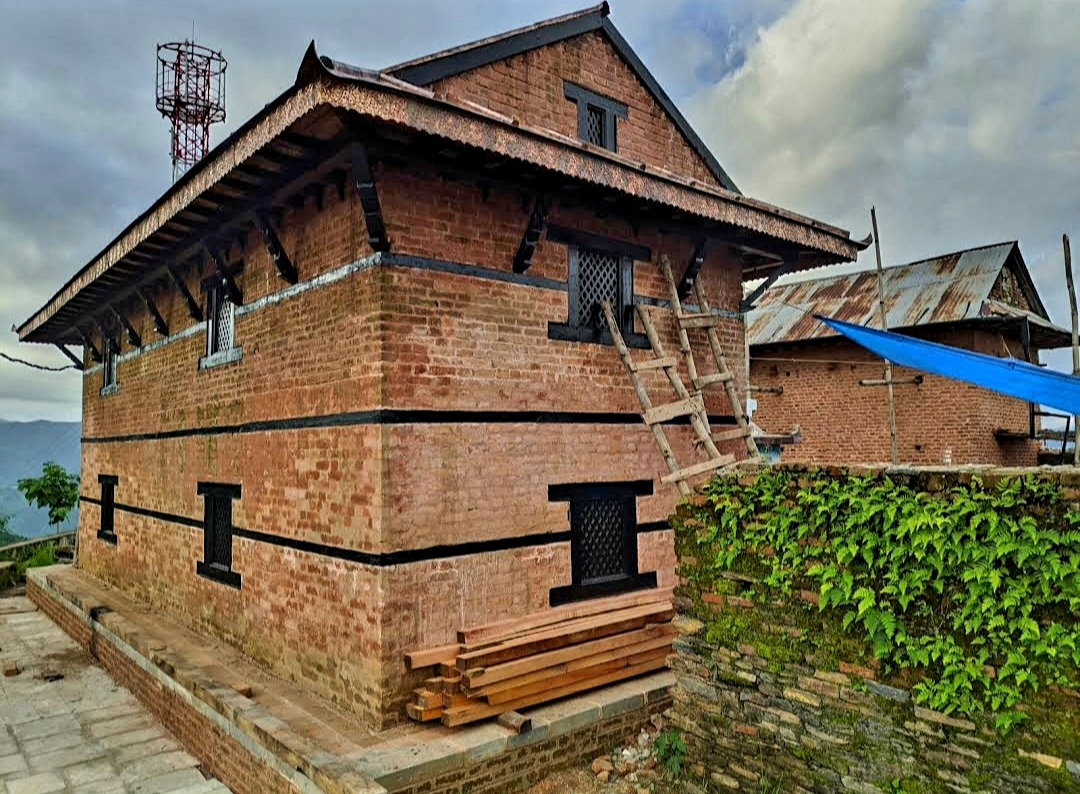
The historical Kingdom of Dhurkot is located in Rajasthal, Ward No. 6 of Dhurkaet Rural Municipality

The Kingdom of Dhurkot (Nepali: धुर्कोट राज्य) was a petty kingdom in the confederation of 24 states known as Chaubisi Rajya. Founded by Khadga raj Shah from Meghasi clan.The Kingdom of Palpa supported Bahadur Shah of Nepal who annexed Dhurkot and in return, Palpa kings were given various item including 101 elephants, 1,001 horses, and money. The territory of Dhurkot now forms part of Gulmi District of Lumbini Province.
