= Indra, Crown Princess of Nepal =

Indra Rajya Lakshmi Devi Shah इन्द्र राज्यलक्ष्मी देवी शाह
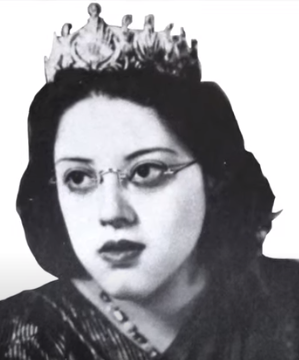
- Indra in 1945

Crown Princess of Nepal
- Reign: 8 May 1940 – 4 September 1950
- Born: 25 July 1926; Hari Bhawan, Bagmati, Kathmandu, Nepal
- Died: 4 September 1950 (aged 24); Narayanhity Royal Palace, Kathmandu, Nepal
- Spouse: Mahendra Bir Bikram Shah Dev (m. 1940)
- Issue: Princess Shanti; Princess Sharada; King Birendra; King Gyanendra; Princess Shobha; Prince Dhirendra
Names
- Indra Rajya Lakshmi Devi Shah
- Dynasty: Rana dynasty (by birth); Shah dynasty (by marriage)
- Father: Hari Shamsher Jang Bahadur Rana
- Mother: Megha Kumari Rajya Lakshmi
- Religion: Hinduism

Indra Rajya Lakshmi Devi Shah (25 July 1926 – 4 September 1950) was the consort and Crown Princess of Mahendra Bir Bikram Shah Dev.

== Life ==
She was the first wife of Mahendra of Nepal (1920–1972). Crown Princess Indra belonged to the aristocratic Rana family and was the daughter of late Honorary General Hari Shamsher Jang Bahadur Rana and his wife, Megha Kumari Rajya Lakshmi.

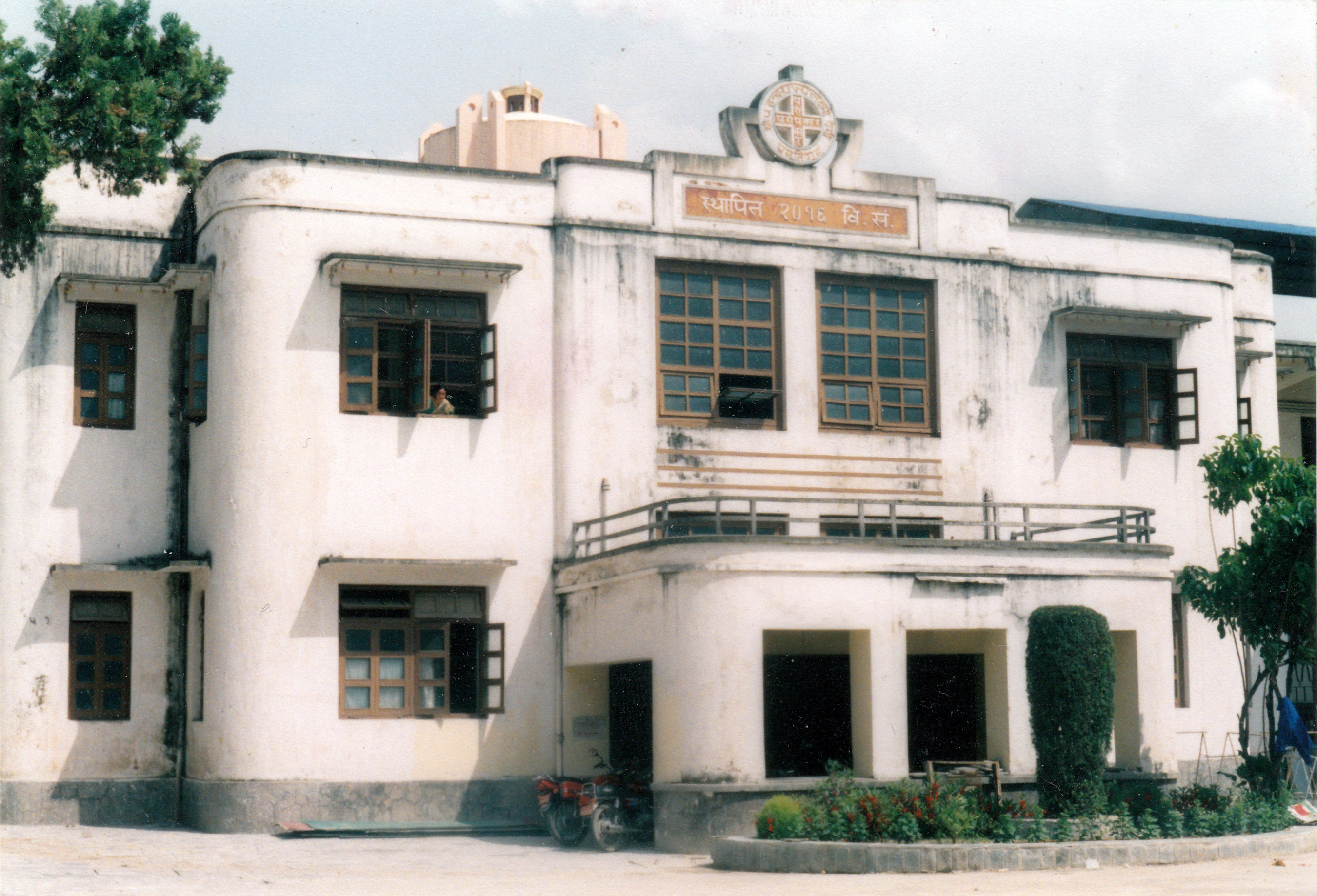
Prasuti Griha, built on the grounds of Charburja Durbar

She married Crown Prince Mahendra on 8 May 1940 as a teenager at 14, and died on 4 September 1950 at the age of 24. She bore three sons and three daughters before her early death. She succumbed to a post-partum haemorrhage, a complication following the birth of her sixth child, Dhirendra. The death of the Crown Princess led to the building of the kingdom's first maternity hospital, the Prasuti Griha, and her head-and-shoulders statue stands in the entrance of the hospital that was built on the grounds of Charburja Durbar and was opened on 17 August 1959.

Two years after Indra's death, her younger sister Ratna married Crown Prince Mahendra. There were no children by this marriage.

== Offspring ==
Name	Birth	Death	Spouse	Children
Princess Shanti	20 November 1940	1 June 2001 (aged 60)	Deepak Jang Bahadur Singh	1) Binod Singh; 2) Pramod Singh; 3) Chhaya Devi
Princess Sharada	2 February 1942	1 June 2001 (aged 59)	Khadga Bikram Shah	1) Bikash Bikram Shah; 2) Deebas Bikram Shah; 3) Ashish Bikram Shah
King Birendra	29 December 1945	1 June 2001 (aged 55)	Queen Aishwarya	1) King Dipendra; 2) Princess Shruti; 3) Prince Nirajan
King Gyanendra	7 July 1947 (age 79)	Living	Queen Komal	1) Crown Prince Paras; 2) Princess Prerana
Princess Shova	17 January 1949 (age 77)	Living	Mohan Bahadur Shahi	1) Himvan Shahi; 2) Manuja Shah
Prince Dhirendra	14 January 1950	1 June 2001 (aged 51)	1) Princess Prekshya; 2) Jaya Pandey; 3) Shirley Greaney	1) Princess Puja; 2) Princess Dilasha; 3) Princess Sitashma; 4) Shreya Shah; 5) Ushaana Laela Shah

Four of her children were killed in the 2001 royal massacre.

Royal titles
Preceded by Lalit	Crown Princess of Nepal; 1940–1950	Succeeded by Ratna
