= Salyan, Baglung =

Coordinates: 28°9′N 83°26′E

Salyan सल्यान
- Village development committee
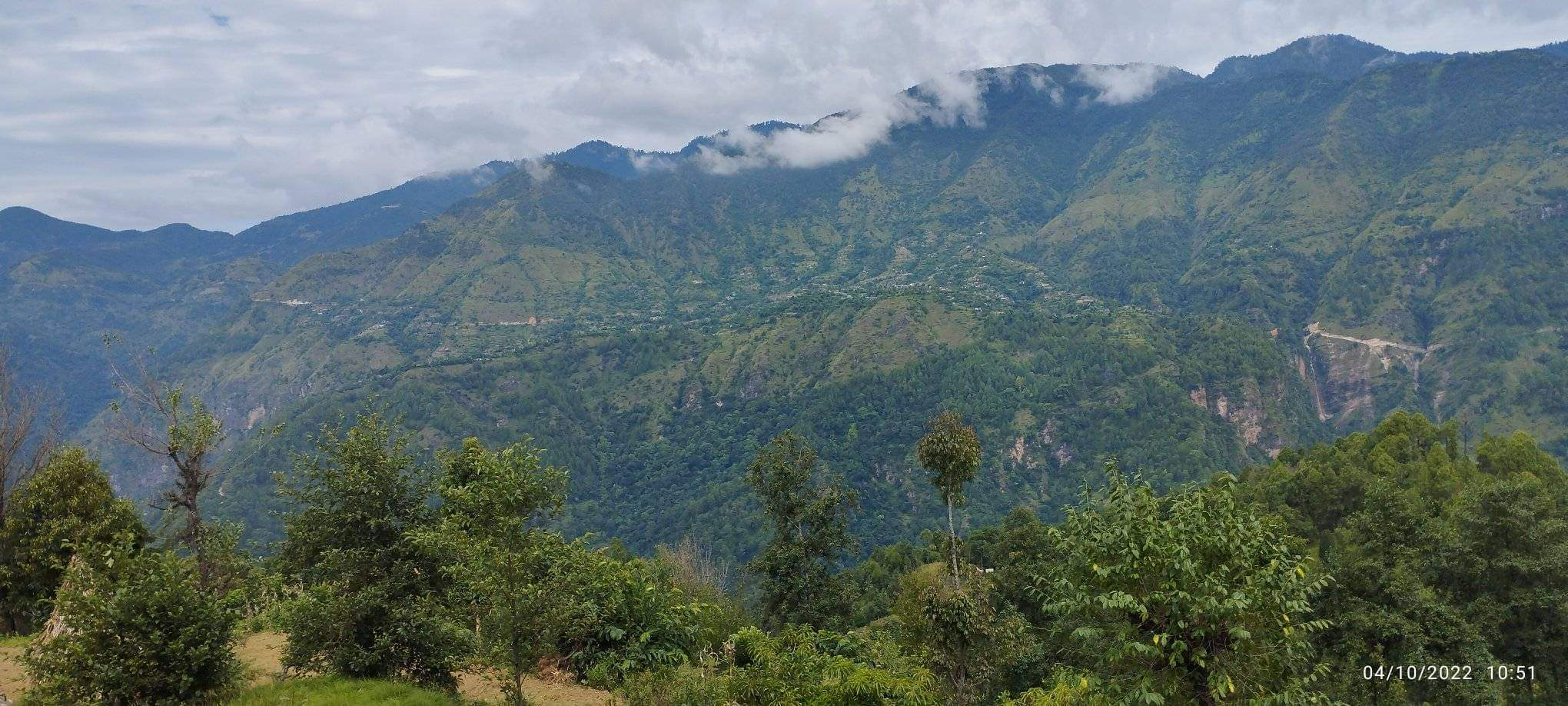

- Location in Nepal Salyan (Nepal)
- Country: Nepal: Nepal

Population (2021)
  - Total: 1,525
  - Density: 120/km^{2} (310/sq mi)
  - Religions: Hindu
- Time zone: Nepal Time
- Postal code: 33300
- Area code: 068

Salyan Village is located in the Bareng Rural Municipality of Baglung District in Nepal. It is located in Gandaki Province. Before 2074 B.S (2017), it was the Salyan V.D.C. Later, it changed the entire area to a single ward, Bareng Rural Municipality Ward No. 4. The total population is 1365, according to the 2021 census, and the area of Salyan is 10.99 km2.

== Geography ==
Located at an altitude of about 2,100 metres above sea level, the average temperature is 13.2 °C (55.76°F). The most important rivers in Salyan are the Tamu Khola in the west and the Hudi Khola. There is a waterfall about 50 metres high in Salyan, but it does not attract tourists due to lack of infrastructure and advertisement.

Salyan has a total of 9 pokhari (natural pools):

1. सल्यान ठूलो पोखरी

2. पालेवान पोखरी

3. डाँडा पोखरी

4. माथिल्लो डाँडा पोखरी

5. देउजी पोखरी

6. डहरे पोखरी

7. ठूला शौरा पोखरी

8. चुरे पोखरी

9. खाली डाँडा पोखरी

Salyan also has important Hindu temples:

1. शिव मन्दिर (डहरे)

2. शिवालय मन्दिर (सपाउँदे)

3. शिवालय मन्दिर (धावा)

4. माईको मन्दिर (सल्यान)

5. कालिका मन्दिर (बगाले)

6. थुम्का मन्दिर (थुम्का)

== Tourist attractions ==
Bhritri Ban: It is a tourist spot with a flat area that includes a football field under construction and a naturally dense forest.

Arukharkha Chair: The highest axis of the rural municipality with flat terrain that offers a panoramic view of the valley below. Waterfall area of Bhandar Khola: more than 150 stairs and a waterfall of over 50 metres, along with a small hydropower plant. For nature enthusiasts and adventure seekers, Salyan Village serves as a gateway to explore the surrounding natural wonders. Trekking and hiking routes are abundant, offering opportunities to discover hidden trails, pristine water sources, and panoramic viewpoints. The village also serves as a starting point for treks to popular destinations like Dhorpatan Hunting Reserve and the Jaljala Trek.

== Tourism ==
The entire population is Hindu. From the summit of Salyan you can see the Dhaulagiri mountain region from close up. The village is surrounded by rolling hills, with the posh town of Shantipur to the south and dense forests. All people walk about 12 km to Shantipur for various purposes. in 2068 BC, the road reached Salyan: Salyan, Lekha (Sapaude), Besi (Thaplung) and Dhava. The fertile land and favorable climatic conditions are suitable for the cultivation of rice, maize, millet, wheat and various vegetables. The villagers also breed livestock, including cows, goats and chickens.

== Festival And Facility ==
Every year, cultural events such as Salyan Mahotsab take place in Salyan. Salyan has four schools, one of which goes up to class 10, and the others go up to class 5. Basic amenities such as Salyan Health Post and local shops are available to cater to the needs of the villagers.

== See More ==
BaglungBareng rural municipality

Gandaki

Gandaki
