= Gwalichaur =

Gwalichaur ग्वालीचौर
- Village development committee
- Location in Nepal Gwalichaur (Nepal)
- Coordinates: 28.27°N 83.23°E
- Country: Nepal
- Zone: Dhawalagiri Zone
- District: Baglung District

Population (1991)
  - Total: 3,907
  - Religions: Hindu
- Time zone: UTC+5:45 (Nepal Time)

Gwalichaur is a village development committee in Baglung District in the Dhawalagiri Zone of central Nepal. At the time of the 1991 Nepal census it had a population of 3,907 and had 699 houses in the town.
