= Princess Shanti Singh of Nepal =

Princess Shanti Singh
- Princess of Nepal; Rani of Bajhang
- Born: 20 November 1940; Narayanhity Royal Palace, Kathmandu, Nepal
- Died: 1 June 2001 (aged 60); Narayanhity Royal Palace, Kathmandu, Nepal
- Cause of death: Assassination (gunshot wounds)
- Spouse: Kumar Deepak Jang Bahadur Singh, 60th Raja of Bajhang (m. 1965; died 1984)
- Issue: Binod Singh, 61st Raja of Bajhang; Pramod Singh; Chhaya Devi
Names
- Shanti Rajya Lakshmi Devi Singh
- House: Shah dynasty (by birth)
- Father: Mahendra of Nepal
- Mother: Indra Rajya Lakshmi Devi
- Religion: Hindu

Princess Shanti Singh of Nepal or Shanti Rajya Lakshmi Devi Singh (20 November 1940 – 1 June 2001) was a Nepalese princess and Rani of Bajhang after her marriage to Kumar Deepak Jang Bahadur Singh, 60th Raja of Bajhang. The eldest child of King Mahendra of Nepal, she was one of the ten people who died in the June 2001 Nepalese royal massacre.

The name Shanti means "inner peace".

== Life ==
The eldest child of King Mahendra and his first wife Crown Princess Indra, Princess Shanti was educated at Loreto Convent, Darjeeling and Tribhuvan University.

Known as humble and hardworking, Princess Shanti was involved in different social welfare activities. She was Patron of the Nepal Leprosy Relief Association.

She married in Kathmandu, on 8 February 1965, Kumar Deepak Jang Bahadur Singh, 60th Raja of Bajhang (died in 1984 in London). They had three children, two sons and one daughter:

- Binod Singh, 61st Raja of Bajhang.
- Pramod Singh.
- Chhaya Devi. She married Pradeep Bikram Rana, of Jajarkot.

In 1972, she founded the Nepal Leprosy Relief Association and became its patron in 1994. A life member of the Nepalese Red Cross Society and the Family Planning Association, Princess Shanti also greatly contributed to the welfare of disabled people, becoming the president of the Disabled Welfare Fund Management Committee in 1987.

She was killed in the Nepalese royal massacre on 1 June 2001, along with nine other members of the Nepalese royal family.

== Honours ==
National honours

- Member of the Order of Three Divine Powers, 1st class.
- Member of the Order of the Gurkha Right Hand, 1st class (13 April 1972).
- Vishesh Sewalankar [Distinguished Service Medal].
- King Mahendra Coronation Medal (2 May 1956).
- King Birendra Coronation Medal (25 February 1975).
- Commemorative Silver Jubilee Medal of King Birendra (31 January 1997).
