= Prince Dhirendra of Nepal =

Prince Dhirendra
- Prince of Nepal
- Born: 4 January 1950; Narayanhity Royal Palace, Kathmandu, Nepal
- Died: 1 June 2001 (aged 51); King Birendra Military Hospital, Chhauni, Nepal
- Cause of death: Assassination (gunshot wounds)
- Spouse: Prekshya Rajya Lakshmi Devi (m. 1972) Jaya Pandey; Shirley Greaney
- Issue: Princess Puja; Princess Dilasha; Princess Sitashma; Shreya Shah; Ushaana Laela Shah
Names
- Dhirendra Bir Bikram Shah Dev
- House: Shah dynasty
- Father: Mahendra of Nepal
- Mother: Indra Rajya Lakshmi Devi
- Religion: Hindu

Prince Dhirendra Bir Bikram Shah Dev of Nepal (Nepali: अधिराजकुमार धिरेन्द्र बीर विक्रम शाह देव) (4 January 1950 – 1 June 2001) was the youngest son of King Mahendra of Nepal and his first wife, Crown Princess Indra.

== Education ==
He studied with his brothers King Birendra and King Gyanendra in St Joseph's College, Darjeeling, India; and in 1969, he graduated from Tribhuvan University, Kathmandu.

== Life ==
His mother Indra died due to birth complications.

Prince Dhirendra was often described as the "wayward" one among Mahendra's sons. He was described as fun-loving, generous and kind. When he was in school, he was interested in theatre. Prince Dhirendra was also interested in sports. He had a black belt (2 Dan) in Judo from Kodokan Judo Institute, Japan. He was also a chief scout of Nepal and patron of the National Sports Council. In 1987, he was the chairman of the National Youth Services Foundation. In 1974, he represented the king at the coronation of Bhutanese King Jigme Singye Wangchuck.

Prince Dhirendra renounced his title of Prince and the style of His Royal Highness because of his relationship with a foreigner in December 1987. After that, he lived in England until he returned to Nepal in 1998.

== Marriages and family ==
On 13 May 1973, he married his second cousin (and the sister of the wives of his brothers, Queen Aishwarya and Queen Komal), Princess Prekshya (19 January 1956 – 12 November 2001). From this marriage, he had three daughters:

- Princess Puja Rajya Lakshmi Devi Shahi (b. 24 March 1977). She married Captain Dr Rajiv Raj Shahi in 1998. She had children;
- Princess Dilasha Rajya Lakshmi Devi Rana (b. 4 August 1979). She married in 2003 Kumar Adarsha Bikram Rana. She had children;
- Princess Sitashma Rajya Lakshmi Devi Shah (b. 11 May 1981). She married Abinesh Shah in 2003. She had children.

The couple did not get along. He and Prekshya separated when he renounced the style of Royal Highness, which Prekshya did not. Dhirendra went to live in London with an English woman who became his partner.

== Death ==
Dhirendra was killed in the June 1, 2001 royal massacre at Narayanhiti Royal Palace, during one of his rare visits to the country. He was due to regain his title and place in the line of succession.

== Styles ==
- 1950 - 1972: His Royal Highness Sri Panch Adhirajkumar Dhirendra Bir Bikram Shah Deva.
- 1972 - 1986: Colonel His Royal Highness Suprasidha-Prabala-Gorkha-Dakshina-Bahu Sri Panch Adhirajkumar Dhirendra Bir Bikram Shah Deva.
- 1986 - 1987: Colonel His Royal Highness Suprasidha-Prabala-Gorkha-Dakshina-Bahu Sri Panch Adhirajkumar Sir Dhirendra Bir Bikram Shah Deva, GCMG.
- 1987 - 2001: Suprasidha-Prabala-Gorkha-Dakshina-Bahu Sir Dhirendra Bir Bikram Shah Deva, GCMG.

== Honours ==
- 2 May 1956: King Mahendra Coronation Medal.
- 13 April 1972: Order of the Gurkha Right Hand, 1st class (Suprasidha-Prabala-Gorkha-Dakshina-Bahu).
- 24 February 1975: King Birendra Coronation Medal.
- 17 February 1986: Knight Grand Cross of the Order of St Michael and St George (GCMG).
- 24 February 1997: Commemorative Silver Jubilee Medal of King Birendra.
