= Jajarkot Palace =

Palace in Karnali, Nepal

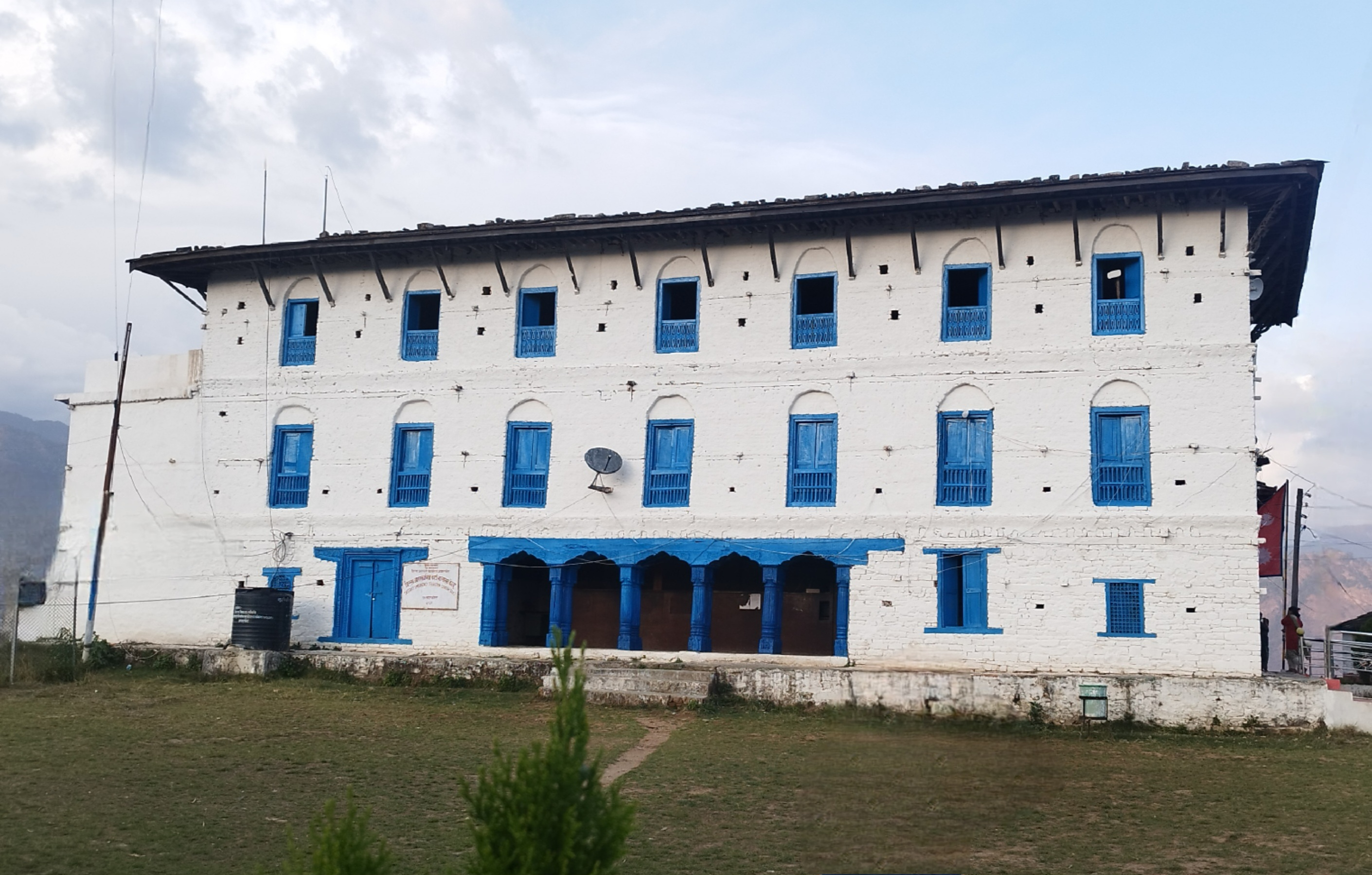

- Location within Karnali Province Jajarkot Palace (Nepal)

General information
- Type: Palace
- Architectural style: Nepalese architecture
- Location: Jajarkot District, Karnali Province, Nepal
- Coordinates: 28.699101189843365°N 82.2006814639445°E

Jajarkot Palace is a historic place located in Jajarkot District, Karnali Province, Nepal.

The palace was built by the King of Jajarkot Hari Shah in 1825 (Bikram Sambat). The palace was originally seven storeys and was reduced to four storeys due to the 1934 Nepal–India earthquake. The April 2015 Nepal earthquake further damaged the building.
