= Princess Sharada Shah of Nepal =

Princess Sharada Shah
- Princess of Nepal
- Born: 2 February 1942; Narayanhity Royal Palace, Kathmandu, Nepal
- Died: 1 June 2001 (aged 59); Narayanhity Royal Palace, Kathmandu, Nepal
- Cause of death: Assassination (gunshot wounds)
- Spouse: Kumar Khadga Bikram Shah (m. 1965)
- Issue: Bikash Bikram Shah; Deebas Bikram Shah; Ashish Bikram Shah
Names
- Sharada Rajya Lakshmi Devi Shah
- House: Shah dynasty (by birth)
- Father: Mahendra of Nepal
- Mother: Indra Rajya Lakshmi Devi
- Religion: Hindu

Princess Sharada Shah of Nepal or Sharada Rajya Lakshmi Devi Shah (2 February 1942 – 1 June 2001) was the middle daughter of King Mahendra of Nepal. Princess Sharada and her husband, Kumar Khadga, were two of the ten members of the Nepalese royal family killed in the June 2001 Nepalese royal massacre.

== Life ==
Princess Sharada was the second daughter of King Mahendra and his first wife, Crown Princess Indra.

The name Sharada means "Goddess of Art and Knowledge".

Princess Sharada was educated at Loreto Convent, Darjeeling and Tribhuvan University. She was active in social welfare and child welfare activities. Princess Sharada was affiliated with the Nepalese Red Cross Society, the Disaster Relief Subcommittee, and the Child Welfare Subcommittee, among other organizations. In 1971, she founded the SOS Village-Nepal, and was its chairperson.

Princess Sharada married Kumar Khadga Bikram Shah (1939–2001) on 29 May 1965 in Kathmandu. His ancestors were the rajas of Jumla in the west region of Nepal. He was a well-known academic and writer, and they had three sons:

1. Brigadier General Bikash Bikram Shah, Special Operations Force Commander: First married to Sheeba Shivangini Singh, a writer. Later they divorced, and he married Priyadarshini Pande, a granddaughter of Sardar Bhim Bahadur Pande, a member of the aristocratic Pande family.
2. Deebas Bikram Shah, Convener: He married Preeti Rajya Lakshmi.
3. Ashish Bikram Shah: He married Pramada Rajya Lakshmi, a social activist, daughter of Prabhat Shumsher Jang Bahadur Rana and his wife, Neera Rajya Lakshmi, and granddaughter of Nir Shumsher Jung Bahadur Rana and his second wife, Bimala Rajya Lakshmi. Later they divorced.

Both Princess Sharada and Kumar Khadga were killed in the Nepalese royal massacre on 1 June 2001.

== Honours ==
National Honours

- Member of the Order of Gorkha Dakshina Bahu, 1st class (13 April 1972).
- King Mahendra Investiture Medal (2 May 1956).
- King Birendra Investiture Medal (24 February 1975).
- Commemorative Silver Jubilee Medal of King Birendra (31 January 1997).

Foreign Honours

- Japan : Dame Grand Cordon of the Order of the Precious Crown (16 May 1978).
- Spain : Dame Grand Cross of the Order of Isabella the Catholic (17 September 1983).
