= Kingdom of Tanahun =

Former kingdom located in present-day Nepal

Kingdom of Tanahun Nepali: तनहुँ
- Capital: Tanahunsur
- Government: Monarchy
- Historical era: Chaubisi Rajyas
Succeeded by
Kingdom of Nepal
- Today part of: Nepal

The Kingdom of Tanahun (Nepali: तनहुँ राज्य) was a petty kingdom in the confederation of 24 states known as Chaubisi Rajya.

== List of monarchs ==
#	Name	Reign	Notes	Ref.
1	Bihanga Sen			
2	Hammar Sen			
3	Tula Sen			
4	Damodar Sen			
5	Dig Vijaya Sen			
