= Kingdom of Galkot =

Former kingdom located in present-day Nepal

Kingdom of Galkot Nepali: गल्कोट
- Government: Monarchy
- Historical era: Chaubisi Rajyas
Succeeded by
Kingdom of Nepal
- Today part of: Nepal

The Kingdom of Galkot was a historical kingdom located in Baglung, Nepal. It was among the Chaubisi Rajya's before Prithivi Narayan Shah unified into Nepal. Lieutenant colonel James Achilles Kirkpatrick described the kingdom as a "considerable fort and town". It was ruled by the Malla kings.

== See also ==
- Galkot Durbar
