= Chaubisi Rajya =

Former confederation in Nepal

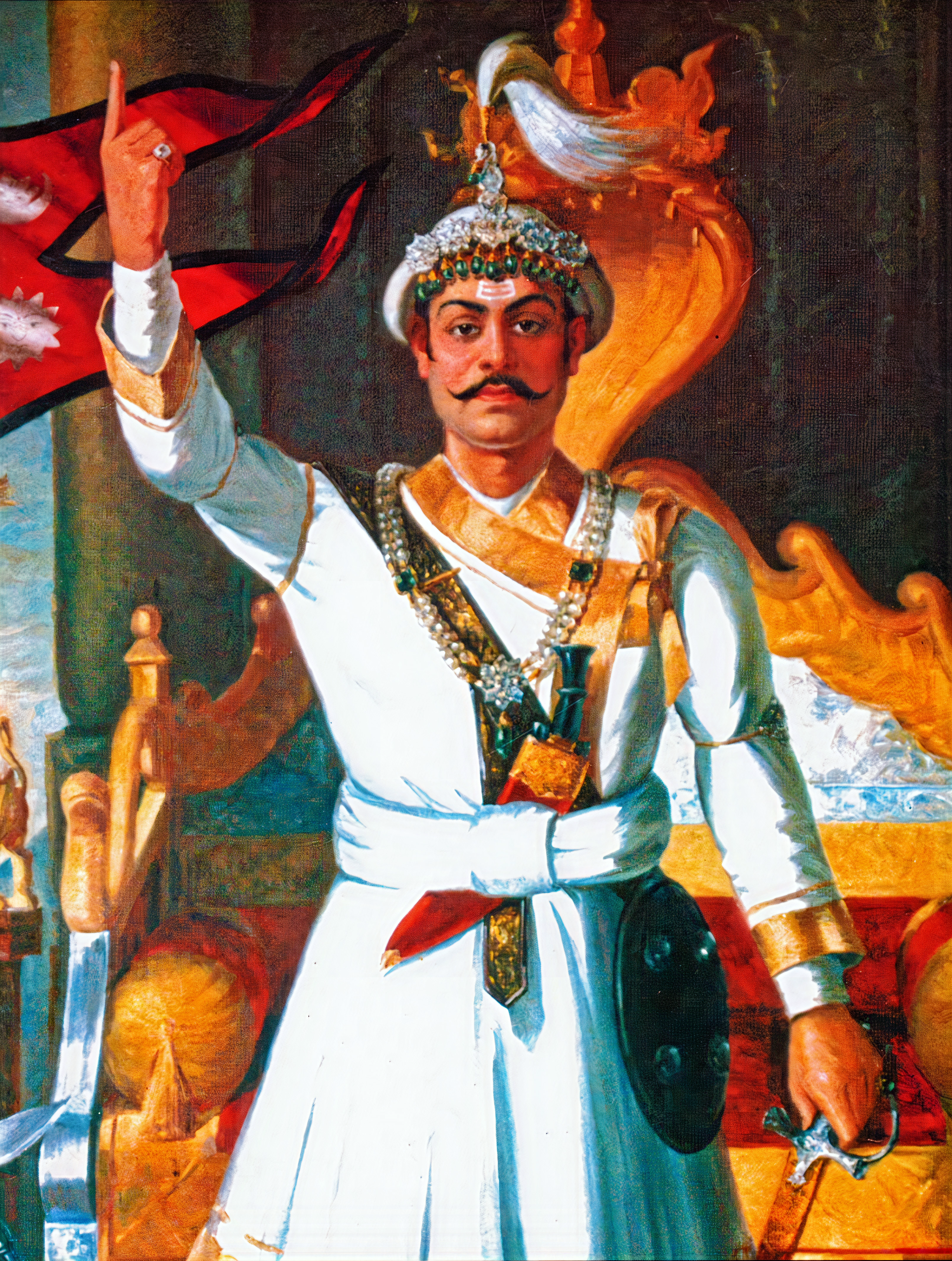
Prithvi Narayan Shah, the last ruler of the Gorkha Kingdom and the first King of Nepal

The Chaubisi Rajya, Chaubise Rajya, or Chaubisye Rajya (Nepali: चौबीसी राज्य, चौबीसे राज्य; lit. ‘24 principalities’) were a group of sovereign and intermittently allied petty kingdoms located in the mid-hill regions of present-day central and western Nepal. These principalities were ruled by various local dynasties, including Thakuri, Khas, and Magar lineages, reflecting the ethnic and political diversity of the region. One of these kingdoms, Gorkha, under King Prithvi Narayan Shah, began a campaign of unification soon after his accession in 1743 AD. This process led to the gradual annexation of the Chaubisi states between 1744 and 1816 AD. To the west of the Gandaki Basin, a parallel confederation of 22 small kingdoms known as the Baise Rajya (Nepali: बाइसे राज्य) also existed, with similarly diverse ruling groups.

The Shah Kingdom was founded by Drabya Shah, the youngest son of Yasho Brahma Shah, king of Kaski and Lamjung, his eldest son became the king of Kaski and Lamjung which created a fight for supremacy. Palpa was one of the biggest and most powerful kingdoms; the rulers were able to create independent kingdoms in Tanahu, Makwanpur and Vijaypur. The first battle took place in Nuwakot. Prithvi Narayan Shah sent Kaji Biraj Thapa Magar to attack Kathmandu, but he returned without fighting, suggesting that they had misjudged the enemy’s strength and the valley’s defenses. Later, Shah sent Kaji Kalu Pande with a larger force. In 1757, during the first Battle of Kirtipur, Kalu Pande was killed, and the Gorkhali army suffered a heavy defeat, marking an important early setback in Shah’s campaign.

Chief of Nuwakot Jayanta Rana Magar (former Kaji of Gorkha) was defending a Nuwakot and knowing that Gorkha is going to attack them in near future had gone to take help from Jaya Prakash Malla. Meanwhile, on September 1744 Prithvi Narayan Shah led the surprise attack on Nuwakot. While Jayanta Rana Magar was away, his son Commander of Nuwakot Sankha Mani Rana Magar tried to defend, but lost. In 1744, Shah conquered Nuwakot, then went on to win a battle against Belkot (Jayanta Rana Magar second fort).

Not much is known about these principalities but these kingdoms played a pivotal role in the modern history of Nepal. The unified Kingdom of Nepal continued to be ruled by the Shah dynasty, with the Rana dynasty de facto ruling the country from 1846 to February 1951 AD. In 2006, a democracy movement broke out that overthrew the monarchy and transitioned to the Federal Democratic Republic.

== List of kingdoms ==
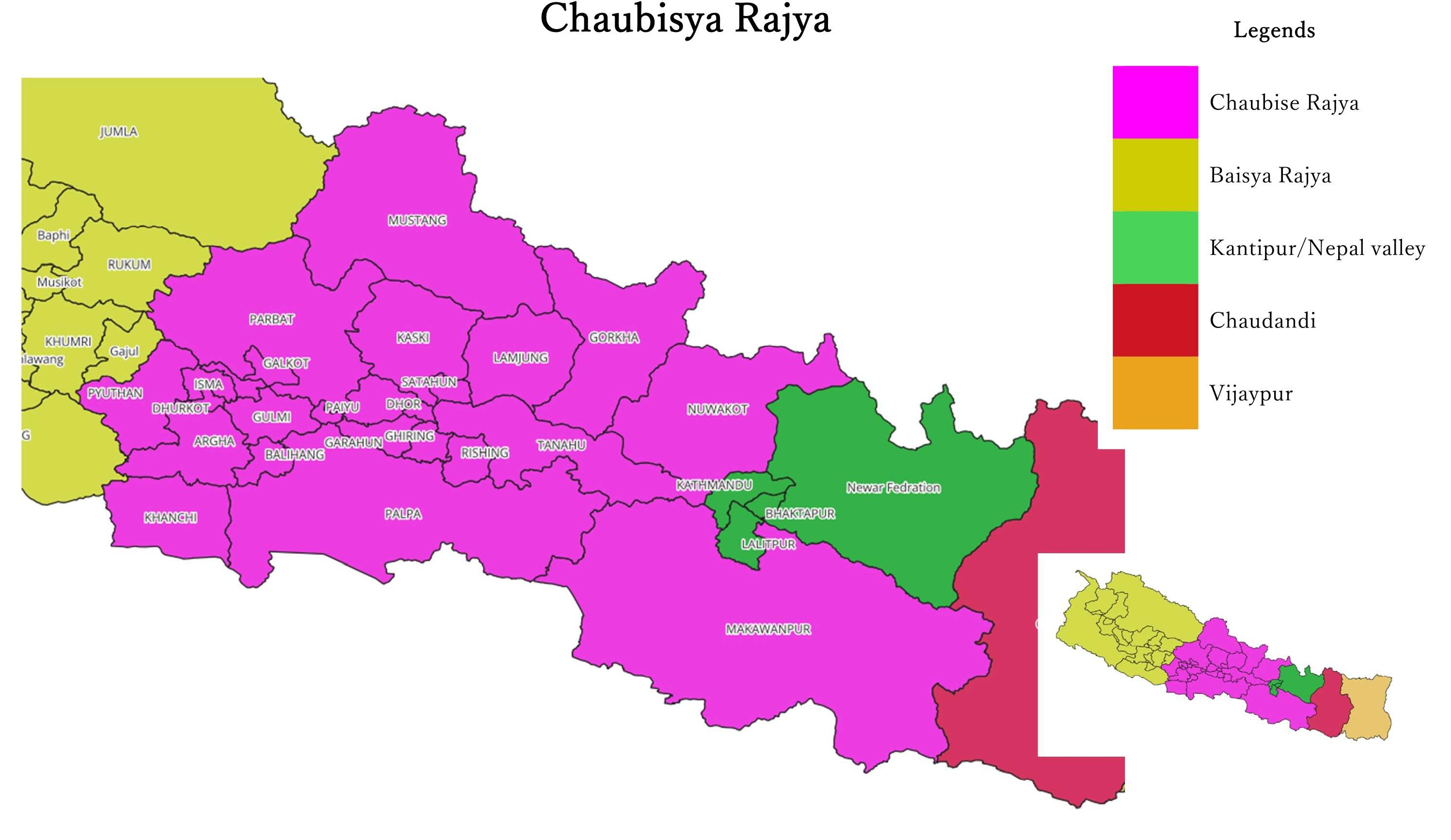

The 24 principalities
Name	Current location
Kingdom of Argha	Lumbini Province
Kingdom of Bajhang	Sudurpashchim Province
Kingdom of Bhirkot	Gandaki Province
Kingdom of Butwal	Lumbini Province
Kingdom of Dhor	Gandaki Province
Kingdom of Dhurkot	Lumbini Province
Kingdom of Galkot	Gandaki Province
Kingdom of Ghiring	Gandaki Province
Kingdom of Garahun	Gandaki Province
Kingdom of Gorkha	Gandaki Province
Kingdom of Gulmi	Lumbini Province
Kingdom of Isma	Lumbini Province
Kingdom of Kaski	Gandaki Province
Kingdom of Khanchi	Lumbini Province
Kingdom of Lamjung	Gandaki Province
Kingdom of Musikot	Lumbini Province
Kingdom of Nuwakot	Gandaki Province
Kingdom of Paiyun	Gandaki Province
Kingdom of Palpa	Lumbini Province
Kingdom of Parbat	Gandaki Province
Kingdom of Pyuthan	Lumbini Province
Kingdom of Rishing	Gandaki Province
Kingdom of Satahun	Gandaki Province
Kingdom of Tanahun	Gandaki Province

== See also ==
- Baise Rajya
