= Kingdom of Khanchi =

Former kingdom located in present-day Nepal

Kingdom of Khanchi Nepali: खाँची
- Government: Monarchy
- Historical era: Chaubisi Rajyas
Succeeded by
Kingdom of Nepal
- Today part of: Nepal

Before the unification of Nepal, Khanchi was one of 24 principalities in the Gandaki River Basin, known collectively as Chaubisi Rajya. Khanchi, established by Raja Hang Vir Singh in Saka era 1357 (AD 1435), was one of three Meghasi Kingdoms; the others were Argha, founded by Raja Huwambar Singh, and Dhurkot, founded by Raja Jagat Jit Singh.

The last Raja of Khanchi was Raja Durga Bhajan Shah. Khanchi was annexed by Gorkha in AD 1786 (1843 BS).

The territory of Khanchi now forms part of Arghakhanchi District.
