= Petty kingdom =

Small kingdom with low significance

The main Anglo-Saxon kingdoms' names are written in red

A petty kingdom is a kingdom described as minor or having little significance. The term comes from the French 'petit' meaning small.

Its use stands in contrast to an empire or unified kingdom that either preceded or succeeded it (e.g. the numerous kingdoms of Anglo-Saxon England unified into the Kingdom of England in the 10th century, or the numerous Gaelic kingdoms of Ireland as the Kingdom of Ireland in the 16th century). Alternatively, a petty kingdom would be a minor kingdom in the immediate vicinity of larger kingdoms, such as the medieval Kingdom of Mann and the Isles relative to the kingdoms of Scotland or England or the Viking kingdoms of Scandinavia.

By the European High Middle Ages, many post-Roman Early Middle Ages petty kingdoms had evolved into principalities, grand duchies, or duchies. By the European Early Modern era, many of these principalities had been mediatized into larger monarchies, but the ruling families were not considered morganatic for marriage considerations, and ranked equal to royal families in society. The various small states of the Holy Roman Empire are generally not considered to be petty kingdoms since they were at least nominally subject to the Holy Roman Emperor and not fully independent.

== England ==
Before the Kingdom of England was established as a united entity, there were various kingdoms in the area—of which the main seven were known as the heptarchy. These were Wessex, Mercia, Northumbria (which also extended into present-day Scotland and originally formed from the earlier kingdoms of Deira and Bernicia), East Anglia (formed from the union of the early kingdoms of Suffolk and Norfolk), Sussex, Kent, and Essex. Other small Anglo-Saxon kingdoms existed at various points, including Hwicce, Lindsey (which survived as the Parts of Lindsey, Lincolnshire) and the Wihtwara (Isle of Wight). These are commonly referred to as "petty kingdoms".

== Norway ==
The petty kingdoms of Norway numbered at least 28:

- Agder
- Grenland
- Gudbrandsdal
- Hadeland
- Hålogaland
- Hardanger
- Hedmark
- Hordaland
- Land
- Namdalen
- Nordmøre
- Oppland
- Orkdalen
- Ranrike
- Raumarike
- Ringerike
- Rogaland
- Romsdal
- Sogn
- Solør
- Sunnmøre
- Telemark
- Toten
- Trøndelag
- Vestfold
- Vestmar
- Vingulmark
- Voss

== Scotland ==
There were many petty kingdoms in Scotland before its unification. They can be grouped by language:

- Brittonic/Cumbric (see Hen Ogledd):
  - Gododdin
  - Strathclyde
  - Rheged (also extended into modern England)
- Pictish:
  - Fortriu
  - Pictavia
  - Cait
  - Ce, situated in modern Mar and Buchan
  - Circinn, perhaps situated in modern Angus and the Mearns
  - Fib, the modern Fife, known to this day as 'the Kingdom of Fife'
  - Fidach, location unknown
  - Fotla, modern Atholl (Ath-Fotla)
- Anglian/Anglo-Saxon:
  - Bernicia (also extended into modern England; conquered the former Gododdin territory)
  - Northumbria (formed from the union of Bernicia with the more southerly Deira; later controlled territory further west upon the incorporation of Rheged)
- Gaelic:
  - Dál Riata (mostly modern Argyll and Bute but originated in and initially extended into Ireland)
- Old Norse/Norse-Gaelic; see also Scandinavian Scotland
  - Kingdom of the Isles (Old Norse: Suðreyjar; also the Kingdom of Mann and the Isles)
  - the Northern Isles (Old Norse: Norðreyjar) and Caithness were also Norse-ruled but were generally subject to Norway and/or Scotland (see Earldom of Orkney).

== See also ==
- Chiefdom
- Feudal fragmentation
- Kleinstaaterei
