= Mahendra of Nepal =

King of Nepal from 1955 to 1972

Mahendra
- Sri Panch Maharajadhiraja Sarkar
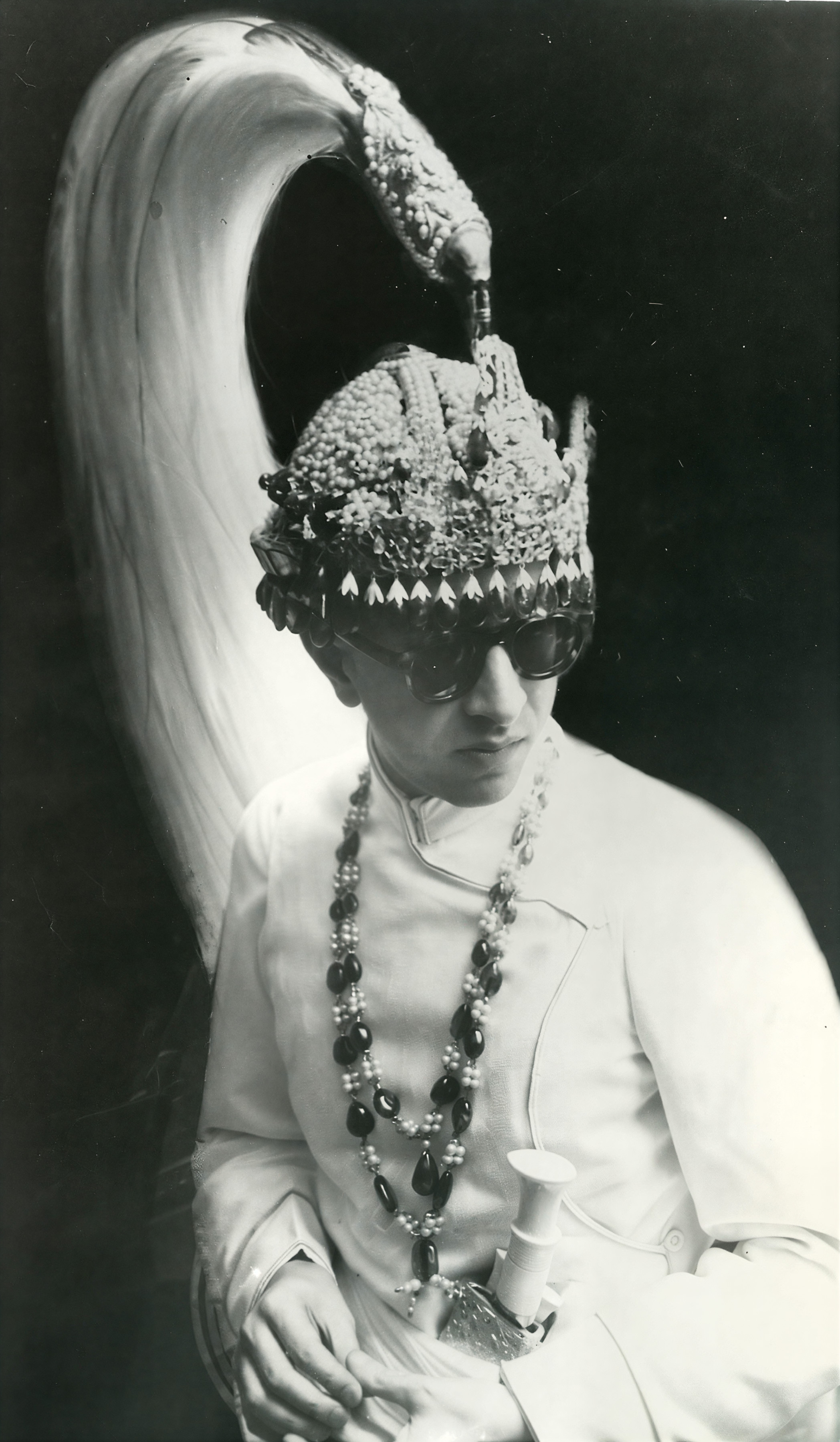
- Mahendra at his coronation in 1956

King of Nepal
- Reign: 13 March 1955 – 31 January 1972
- Coronation: 2 May 1956
- Predecessor: Tribhuvan
- Successor: Birendra
- Prime ministers: See list: Matrika Koirala (1953–1955); Tanka Acharya (1956–1957); K. I. Singh (1957); Subarna Rana (1958–1959); B. P. Koirala (1959–1960); Tulsi Giri (1963); Surya Thapa (1963–1964); Tulsi Giri (1964–1965); Surya Thapa (1965–1969); Kirti Nidhi Bista (1969–1970); Gehendra Rajbhandari (acting: 1970–1971); Kirti Nidhi Bista (1971–1973)
- Born: 11 June 1920; Narayanhiti Durbar, Kathmandu, Kingdom of Nepal
- Died: 31 January 1972 (aged 51); Diyalo Bangala, Chitwan, Kingdom of Nepal
- Spouse: Indra Rajya Lakshmi Devi (m. 1940; died 1950) Ratna Rajya Lakshmi Devi (m. 1952)
- Issue: Prince Rabindra; Princess Shanti; Princess Sharada; Prince Birendra; Prince Gyanendra; Prince Dhirendra; Princess Shova
Names
- Mahendra Bir Bikram Shah Dev; Nepali: महेन्द्र बीर बीक्रम शाह देव
Regnal name
- Sri Panch Maharajadhiraja Mahendra Bir Bikram Shah Dev; Nepali: श्री ५ महाराजाधिराज महेन्द्र बीर बीक्रम शाह देव
- Dynasty: Shah
- Father: Tribhuvan
- Mother: Kanti
- Religion: Hinduism
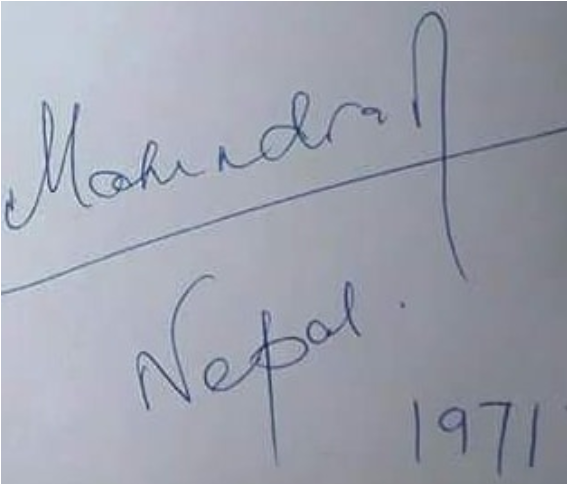
- Signature

Sri Panch Mahendra Bir Bikram Shah Dev (Note: Nepali: महेन्द्र बीर बीक्रम शाह देव, romanized: Mahendra Bīra Bikrama Śāha Deva) (11 June 1920 – 31 January 1972) was King of Nepal from 13 March 1955 until his death in 1972. He led the 1960 royal coup, in which he dismissed the government, suspended the constitution, banned political parties, jailed their leaders, and established the Panchayat rule.

He ruled the country with his Panchayat system for 28 years, with the Panchayat system itself remaining until the introduction of multi-party democracy in 1990. During his reign, Nepal experienced a period of industrial, political and economic change which opened it to the rest of the world for the first time, after the 104-year-long reign of the Rana rulers, who kept the country under an isolationist policy, came to an end in 1951.

== Early life ==
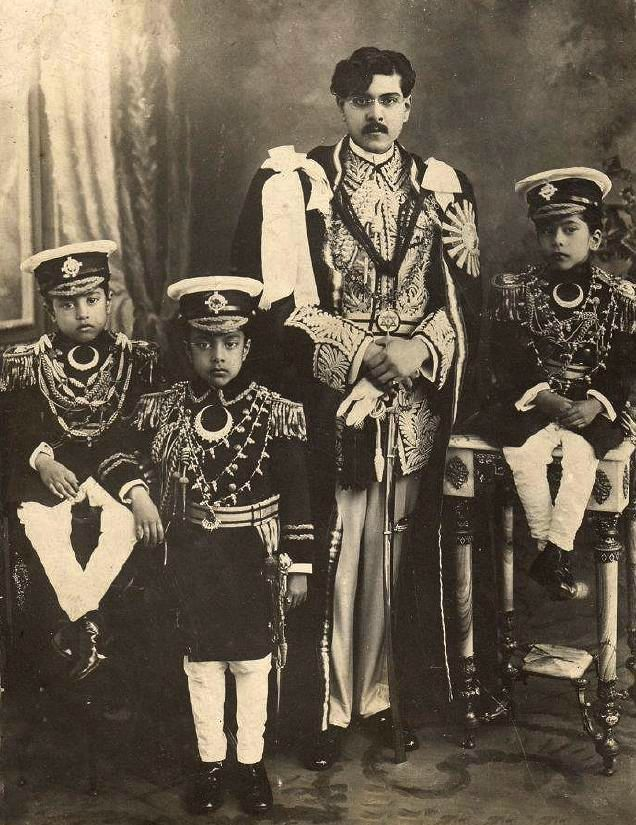
Crown Prince Mahendra, Prince Himalaya Pratap, Prince Basundhara and their father, King Tribhuvan, in 1932.

Mahendra was born on 11 June 1920 at the Narayanhiti Palace to King Tribhuvan of Nepal. He was the eldest child of King Tribhuvan and Queen Kanti. Under the Rana dynasty, the power of the king was reduced to that of a figurehead. Although Tribhuvan was nominally king since 1911, the royal family had been held captive in Narayanhiti Palace since the rise of the prominent Rana dynasty.

Even though he did not have formal education, King Mahendra was privately educated inside the palace and learned politics, economics and Nepali literature, history and culture. He had secret affairs with Gita Gurung in child, he could not marry as she was concubine. So, his family decided to marry her in other royal family status. In 1940, he married Indra Rajya Lakshmi Devi, the granddaughter of Juddha Shumsher Jung Bahadur Rana and daughter of General Hari Shamsher Jung Bahadur Rana. Mahendra had three sons, Birendra, Gyanendra, and Dhirendra and three daughters Shanti, Sharada, and Shova. His first wife, Crown Princess Indra died in 1950.

In 1951 King Tribhuvan launched a successful political movement against the Ranas and established Nepal as a constitutional monarchy. Mahendra was not happy that King Tribhuvan had reduced the rights of the monarchy in the 1951 Interim Constitution while bidding farewell to the Rana dynasty after the 1951 revolution.

After the death of his first wife Indra in 1950, the then Prince Mahendra was in a love affair with sister-in-law, Ratna, but King Tribhuvan was planning to prevent his son from marrying Rana's daughter Ratna under any circumstances. Prince Mahendra did not like the pressure of his father to marry the girl of his choice. King Tribhuvan, on the other hand, was not in favor of expanding relations with the Rana family, even more so with the Shamsher clan. King Tribhuvan was outraged by the insult inflicted on him by Juddha Shamsher, but the dispute had been going on for a long time. In 1952, two years after the death of his crown princess, Mahendra married Indra's younger sister, Ratna Rajya Lakshmi Devi. This created bad relations between him and his father. This marriage produced no children, as King Mahendra had married on the condition his personal life should not hinder his national duties, and the queen agreed to be childless. He became king on 13 March 1955 but his coronation took place on 2 May 1956 due to the one year mourning period of death of his father.

=== Tanka Prasad Acharya's cabinet ===
On 27 January 1956 King Mahendra appointed Acharya as the prime minister of Nepal. The first five-year plan was launched during his tenure as prime minister. During his time, Nepal Rastra Bank and the Supreme Court were established. Acharya's tenure is also seen as a golden age for Nepal in foreign relations. In addition to establishing diplomatic relations with many countries, the government was able to establish close ties with the Chinese government. The Chinese government had provided Rs 60 million to Nepal on 7 October 1956. Tanka Prasad Acharya resigned as prime minister in July 1957.

=== Kunwar Indrajit Singh's cabinet ===
Kunwar Indrajit Singh was appointed prime minister by King Mahendra in 1957. His cabinet included Education Minister Mahakavi Laxmi Prasad Devkota. He tenure was mostly spent in attempts to curtail his own enemies He was later replaced by a government led by Suvarna Samsher Rana. According to General Nara Shumsher Jang Bahadur Rana, he was dismissed by King Mahendra because he tried to stage a coup against the king and relegate him to a 'puppet king', just like in the Rana days.

=== 1959 constitution of the Kingdom of Nepal ===
King Mahendra had promulgated the constitution in 1959 to take the country towards a parliamentary system. On the basis of the royal announcement on 1 February 1958 a Constitution Drafting Commission was formed on 27 March 1958 to take the country towards a parliamentary system. On the basis of the draft prepared by the Constitution Drafting Commission, the Constitution of the Dominion of Nepal (2015) was announced on 12 February 1959 from King Mahendra. Sections 73 and 75 came into force on 12 February 1959, and the rest of the sections came into force from 17 June 1959. In that law, which has a bicameral system, the lower house was the House of Representatives and the upper house was the General Assembly. There was a system of 109 members elected from 109 constituencies in the House of Representatives, while in the General Assembly there were 36 members with 18 elected and 18 nominated. Candidates were required to be 25 years of age to become a candidate for the House of Representatives and 30 years of age to be a candidate for the General Assembly. After reaching the age of 21, one could become a voter. The constitution had made the first provision of Public Service Commission which required one-third member to have not had served government job for last 5 years. The arrangement of the Auditor General was also made for the first time while there was no arrangement for an Election Commission. The constitution recognized Nepali as the official language and Devanagari as the official script of the country. The 1959 election was held in accordance with this constitution.

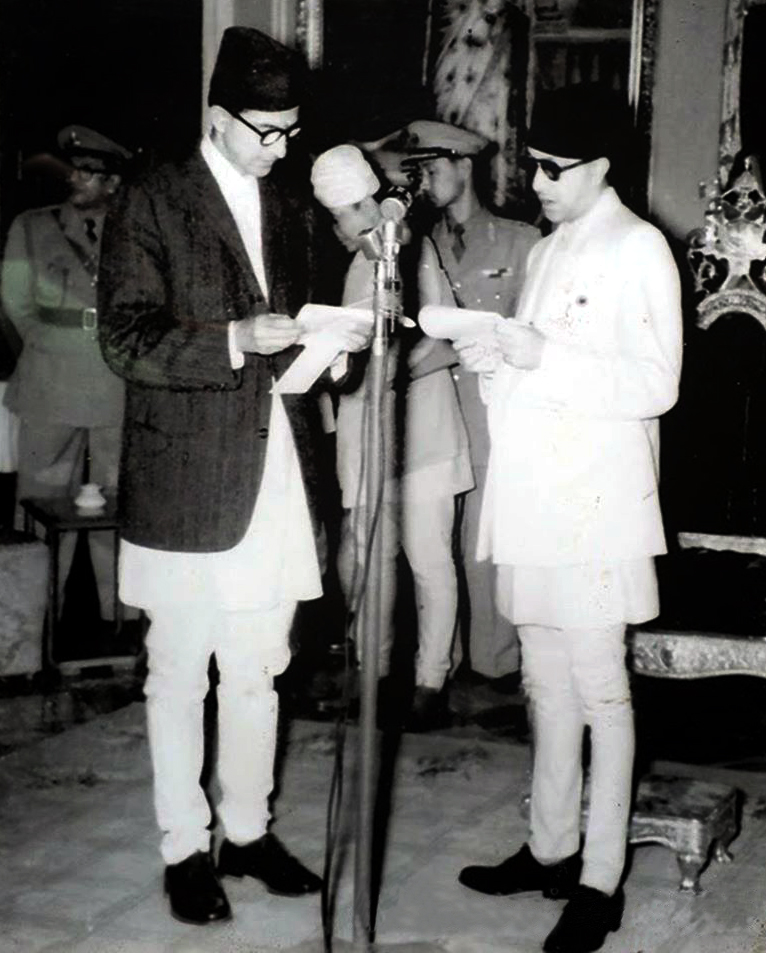
BP Koirala taking oath as 22nd Prime minister of Nepal

=== 1959 general election ===
In order to elect 109 representatives to the House of Representatives, the lower house of the Parliament of Nepal, the first democratic election of Nepal was held in 45 days from February 18 until April 4 1959. This election was held in accordance with the Constitution of the Kingdom of Nepal 1959, which was implemented on February 12 1959. The Nepali Congress, achieved two-third majority and emerged as the largest party in the election.

=== BP Council of Ministers ===
The Nepali Congress, which emerged as the largest party in the election, elected party president B. P. Koirala as the leader of the parliamentary party and fielded him as Nepal's prime minister. On May 27 1959 Bishweshwar Prasad Koirala of the Nepali Congress took the oath of office before the then King Mahendra Bir Bikram Shah. The first assembly of the house took on 1 July 1959.

=== 1960 coup d'état ===
On 15 December 1960, King Mahendra used his emergency powers and took charge of the State once again claiming that the Congress government had fostered corruption, promoted party above national interest and failed to maintain law and order. The King suspended the constitution, dissolved the elected parliament, dismissed the cabinet, imposed direct rule and imprisoned the then-prime minister B. P. Koirala and his closest government colleagues. Political parties were outlawed.

== Panchayat regime ==
On 13 April 1961, Mahendra made a televised appearance, in which he introduced Panchayat, a partyless political system of village, district and national councils. At first, the Nepali Congress leadership propounded a non-violent struggle against the new order and formed alliances with several political parties, including the Gorkha Parishad and the United Democratic Party. However, the king would abolish political activities, jail political dissenters calling them anti-national elements and introduce a new constitution in which the people could elect their representatives, while real power remained in the hands of the monarch.

=== 1962 constitution of the Kingdom of Nepal ===
The Constitution Drafting Commission was formed on 8 May 1962 with the then Minister for Finance and Economic Affairs Rishikesh Shah as chairman and Kulshekhar Sharma as Member Secretary and Mrs. Angur Baba Joshi as the only female member. The commission was assigned to submit the draft constitution to the king within 23 days until 1 June 1962. On 16 December 1962 King Mahendra promulgated a new constitution institutionalizing a four-tier Panchayat System. The constitution had a unicameral legislature named as Rashtriya Panchayat. Sovereign power and residual rights were vested in the King based on Article 90. There was a provision that the constitution could be amended by a royal proclamation from the king. This constitution made the provision of Election Commission and the Commission for Prevention of Abuse of Authority for the first time. The arrangement of 6 class organizations was made which could send its class representatives in the Rashtriya Panchayat while the basic duties of citizens were also designated. The Constitution officially recognized Hindu religion as the national religion and introduced country's first national anthem by giving official recognition to Shriman Gambhir. It also introduced the new modernized national flag of the country and therewith introduced the method to draw out the flag for the first time. In addition to that, it introduced national emblem such as Lali gurans as the national flower, crimson colour as the national colour, the cow as the national animal and Danphe as the national bird of Nepal.

The constitution, which has been amended 3 times, was first amended on 27 January 1967. Through the first amendment, the various English words used in the constitution were replaced with Nepali, Nepal was divided into 14 zones and 75 districts and the arrangement of zonal commissioner was made. The constitution would officially abolish political parties and substitute a "National Guidance" system based on local panchayat led directly by the king.

=== 1963 Panchayat election ===
The first elections to the National Panchayat took place in March and April 1963. The panchayat election of 1963 was held on the basis of constitution of kingdom of Nepal 1962. Although political parties officially were banned and the major opposition parties publicly refused to participate, about one-third of the members of the legislative were associated with the Nepali Congress. There were 4,000 village assemblies at the local level, electing nine members of the village assemblies, who in turn elected a mayor. Each village assemblies sent a member to sit on one of seventy-five district panchayat, representing from forty to seventy villages; one-third of the members of these assemblies were chosen by the town panchayat. Members of the district panchayat elected representatives to fourteen zone assemblies functioning as electoral colleges for the National Panchayat in Kathmandu. In addition, there were class organizations at village, district, and zonal levels for peasants, youth, women, elders, laborers, and ex-soldiers, who elected their own representatives to assemblies.

=== Panchayat system (1962–1972) ===
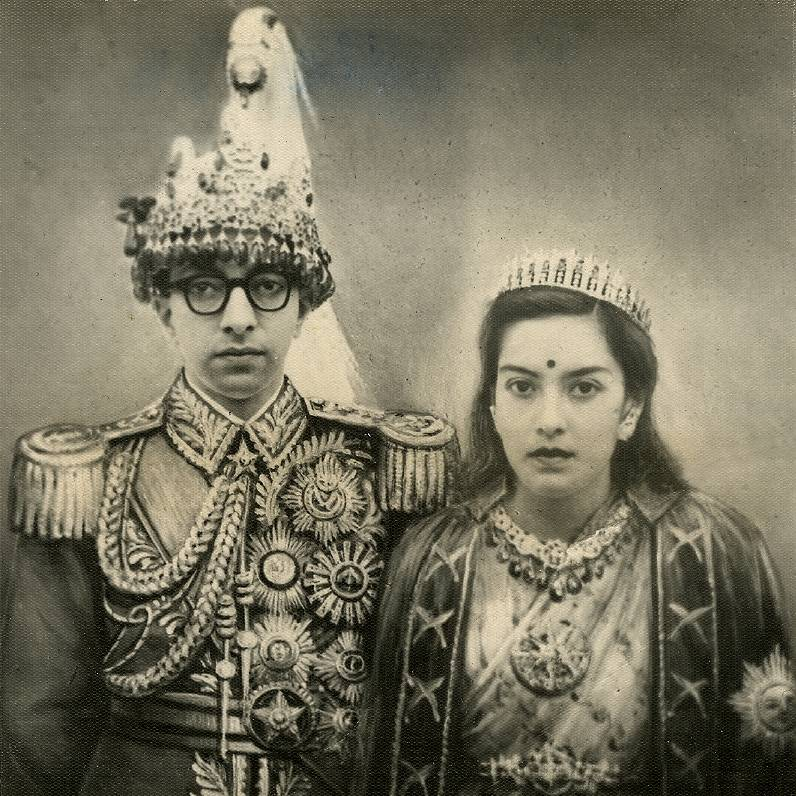
King Mahendra and Queen Ratna in 1957

Adopted on the second anniversary of the royal coup and founded on the idea of having a system "suitable to the soil", the new constitution created a four-tier panchayat system. The National Panchayat of about ninety members could not criticize the royal government, debate the principles of partyless democracy, introduce budgetary bills without royal approval, or enact bills without approval of the king. Mahendra was supreme commander of the armed forces, appointed (and had the power to remove) members of the Supreme Court, appointed the Public Service Commission to oversee the civil service, and could change any judicial decision or amend the constitution at any time. To many of the unlettered citizens of the country, the king was a spiritual force as well, representing the god Vishnu upholding dharma on earth. Within a span of ten years, the king had, in effect, reclaimed the unlimited power exercised by Prithvi Narayan Shah in the eighteenth century.

Support of the king by the army and the government bureaucracy prevented opposition to his rule from developing within the panchayat system. Real power came from the king's secretariat, and in the countryside influence rested in the offices of zonal commissioners and their official staffs or the parallel system of development officers. The Nepali Congress leadership made increasingly conciliatory statements and began to announce its faith in democratic ideals under the leadership of the king. In 1968 the king began to release political prisoners, including B. P. Koirala, who was freed on 30 October. At this point, a three-way split developed in the Nepali Congress. B.P. Koirala went to India, where he headed a wing committed to democratic revolution and violent overthrow of the panchayat system. He was a symbol for youth but powerless politically. Subarna Shamsher's wing continued to advocate local cooperation with the king outside the panchayat system. A third wing tried to work within the panchayat system in the expectation that it would evolve into a democratic system. The disunity of the political opposition left King Mahendra to do as he wished.

== Attempts to overthrow the regime ==
There were multiple struggles and attempts to remove the king from power both before and during the Panchayat regime.

=== 1957 coup d'état attempt ===
King Mahendra used his residual power of Royal prerogative of mercy and pardoned KI Singh in 1955 when he was declared a traitor and rebellion against the state by former state powers. He was then allowed to enter the country and listening to his nationalist view, KI Singh was appointed prime minister by King Mahendra in 1957. He tenure was mostly spent in attempts to curtail his enemies while he also tried to stage a coup against the king with the help of the army. However, the head of the army, General Nar Shamsher, being loyal to the king informed him about the coup and KI Singh was immediately dismissed.

=== Janakpur bomb incident ===
On 22 January 1962 King Mahendra visited the Janaki Mandir temple after completing his eastern tour. Arvind Kumar Thakur and other anti-panchayat youths under the leadership of Durgananda Jha threw a bomb at the car he was traveling in when he was returning to the arena after performing religious visit. Fifty nine people were arrested on the charge of their involvement in the incident and a special court was formed to investigate the incident. The court found three people, Durgananda Jha, Arvind Kumar Thakur and Dal Singh Thapa, guilty on 3 July 1962. They were slapped death penalty on grounds of treason and rebellion on 4 September 1963, after the introduction of new Nation's Legal Code (Muluki Ain) on 17 August 1963 since the old law did not allow the punishment of a person of Brahmin descent. On 29 January 1964 Durgananda Jha was hanged until death while Arvind Kumar Thakur and Dal Singh Thapa had their sentenced changed to life time imprisonment.

== Notable works and improvements ==
=== Promotion of nationalism ===
The current flag institutionalized by the constitution

King Mahendra's role in the promotion of nationalism has been unforgettable. In nearly two centuries since Prithvi Narayan Shah, Nepal was administered as a single political entity from Kathmandu and was treated as a single country by its neighbouring powers including like China, India and Tibet but its citizens never had a unified sense of "Nepali-ness". Even the citizens of the country did not know where and what Nepal was, calling Kathmandu valley as Nepal, lower plains around Birgunj, Biratnagar area as Madesh, upper gorkha region as Gorkha, and western Nepal as Khas and even the king as Gorkhali King rather than a king of Nepal. It is said that Nepal was built before, but Nepal as a political boundary and country was institutionalized by King Mahendra. Before 1960, foreigners were free to purchase land in Nepal. After coup d'état of 1960 King Mahendra banned foreigners from purchasing land in Nepal. At that moment there was no single language used by the whole nation, and Nepalese were increasingly influenced from foreign languages, Indian cultures, Indian cinemas, teaching of Hindi language in the schools were all the signs leading towards the amalgamation of Nepal into India. Mahendra was uncomfortable with the widespread changes happening in the country: a diverse elected cabinet under BP Koirala; political parties in the Terai advocating for an autonomous province; and Hindi, lingua franca of the people of Indian origin, being spoken in Parliament. The king was troubled by how democracy had allowed people to assert their identity and culture forcing communalism, regionalism, and other anti-national motives. When Hindi dominance was increasing in communities, he devised the policy of national language by selecting Khas Kura as the national language, as it was the lingua franca and made it nationwide. The language was transformed from lingua franca, to official language and then later to national language. By establishing the Nepal Rastra Bank, King Mahendra made Nepali currency compulsory throughout the kingdom. At that time, 90 percent of Indian currency was in circulation in Nepal. By creating a distinct language, distinct currency, distinct dress, distinct political system and distinct religious identity from those of the neighbouring nations, Mahendra created a distinct identity of the people which in turn promoted national unity and nationality. King Mahendra personally funded 2 lakh 50 thousand rupees to build a martyr's gate at Bhadrakali, Kathmandu in order to honor the great martyrs, who died for the rights and democracy of the people during the Rana regime.

He is also credited for introducing country's first national anthem by giving official recognition to Shriman Gambhir. The constitution introduced by King Mahendra in 1962 introduced the modern national flag of the country which is being used until today. In 1955 King Mahendra appointed a commission headed by famous writer Balkrishna Sama to make nominations of National heroes of Nepal since ancient times on the basis of their contributions to the nation.

=== Diplomatic campaign ===
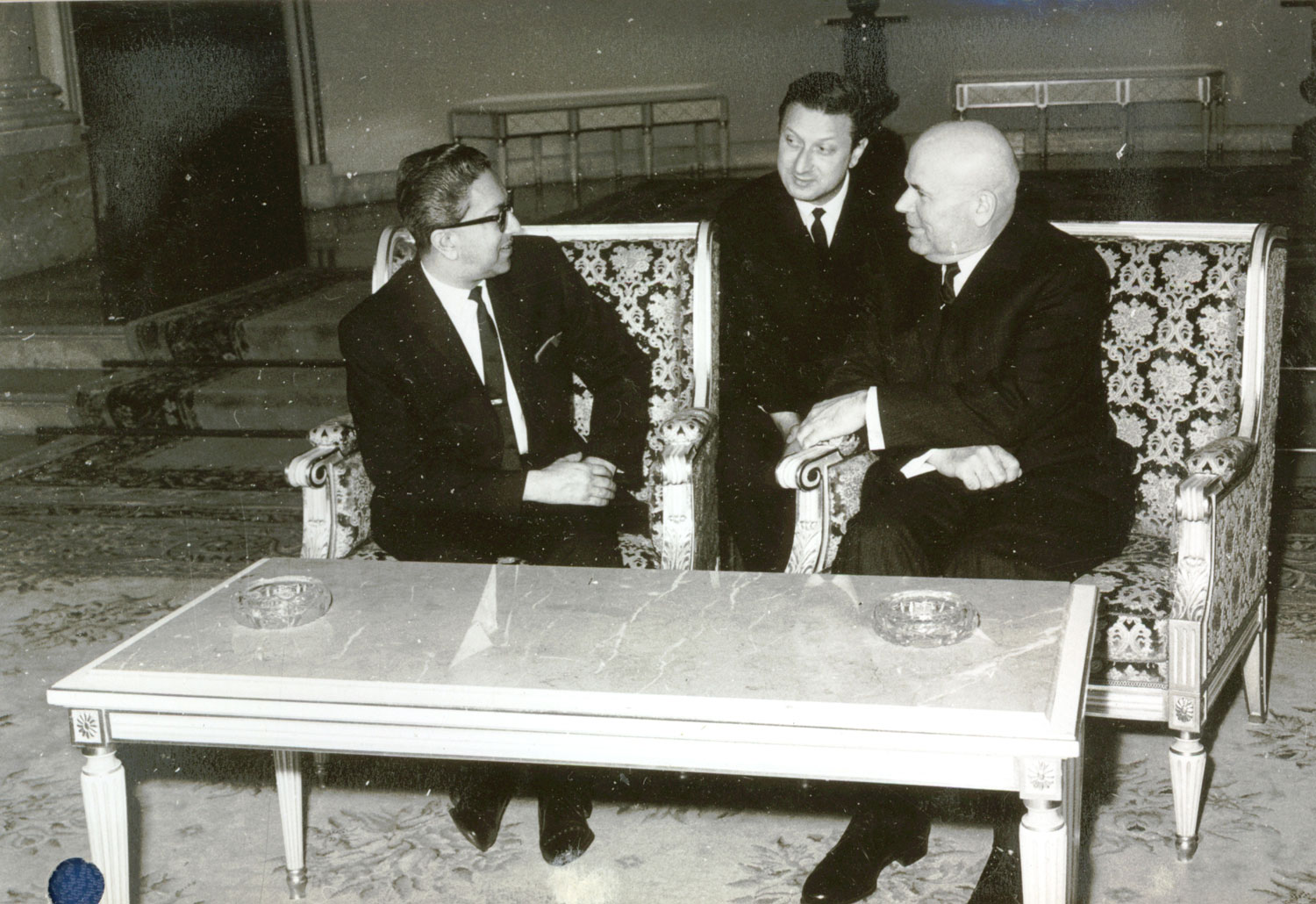
King Mahendra of Nepal met with Chivu Stoica in 1967 in Bucharest, Romania.

The role played by Mahendra in establishing Nepal in the international arena is important. From the thought of achieving membership of the United Nations to establishing Nepal as a zone of peace major attributions goes to King Mahendra. Adopting the principle of Panchsheel and non-aligned foreign policy, he maintained diplomatic relations with neighboring countries and kept them in balance. King Mahendra established diplomatic relations with 45 countries to show the world that Nepal is an independent nation. Mahendra personally attended the 1st Summit of the Non-Aligned Movement in Belgrade, FPR Yugoslavia, making Nepal one of the founding members of the Non-Aligned Movement.

On 14 December 1955 Nepal also became a member of the United Nations. Rishikesh Shah then became the Permanent Representative to the United Nations. On January 27 1956 King Mahendra appointed Acharya as the prime minister of Nepal. He established friendly relations by visiting China and Japan. Under his guidance and policy, Nepal was elected as a Member of United Nations Security Council in 1969. Nepal was elected in the Security Council the second time again in 1988. Nepal established its image as a committed member of the UN and Nepal was well recognized by the member countries. Nepal's active role and the role he played on the Security Council twice are the proof of a success policy guided by the King.

King's tenure is also seen as a golden age for Nepal in foreign policy. In addition to establishing diplomatic relations with many countries, the government was able to establish close ties with the Chinese government. He pursued a foreign policy of neutrality between China and India. One of the historical diplomatic achievement of king Mahendra is his success in Nepal-China Boundary Treaty of 1961. The border adjustments was made on grounds of equality by performing land-swapping with Nepal gaining more land than it gave, after the treaty Nepal gained 302.75 square kilometer more land from China.

=== Development policy ===
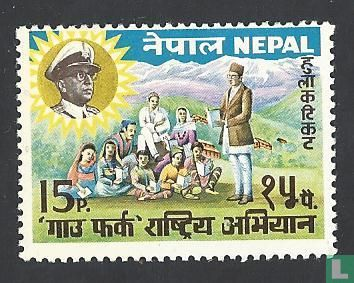
Stamp introduced for promoting Back to the Village National Campaign

King Mahendra introduced five years government plans to plan and oversee development in the country. Seeing the importance of planning in better development, the king established the National Planning Commission in 1956. For the first time the industrial policy of 1957 formally recognized the responsibility of the government in "promoting, assisting and regulating" industrial development in the country and the First Plan intended to establish state monopolies in the fields of transportation, telecommunication, hydro-electric power generation and irrigation, and to run some big industries, such as cement, sugar, cigarettes, textiles, iron and steel From 1960 to 1965, government's population policy was to resettle people from the Hills to the Terai. However, in 1965, King Mahendra formally endorsed a new population policy to bring equilibrium between population and economic growth. The official policy was firstly to reduce population growth through socio-economic change, secondly through family planning program and only then through resettlement. Following the promulgation of Nepal Electricity Corporation Act, Nepal Electricity Corporation (NEC) came into operation in 1962 which was the main authority for responsible for providing electricity to the citizens. The provision of planning for five years known as the five-year plan started during his reign from 1956. He introduced Company Act for the first time in Nepal on 1964 to facilitate and manage the industrialization of the economy. The highway built by the king has greatly contributed to the all round socio-economic development of the country. He launched the Back to the Village National Campaign in 1967, which was one of his largest rural development efforts. He established Nepal Sports Council to oversee the development of the sports activities in the country.

=== Economic reforms ===
Before 1956, Nepal did not have its own foreign currency reserve but rather maintained it in central bank of India. For getting the foreign currency amounts required to bear the expenses of Nepalese Embassies and treatment expenses of King, an application had to be submitted to the Reserve Bank of India. One of the problems that distressed Nepalese economy was the circulation of two types of currency, Nepalese and Indian simultaneously. Nepal had a dominant use of Indian rupee. Exchange rates between the Indian and Nepali currency were fixed by local traders. Between 1950 and 1954 Nepal's economic dependence on India was 95 percent. Seeing this, King Mahendra, established a central bank on 26 April 1956 in order to reduce dependence on India, replace Indian currency being circulated in the market and strengthen the countries' sovereignty by making Nepal independent in foreign currency exchange. Mahendra had managed to bring this dependency below 60 percent.

The responsibility of notes issuance was transferred from "Sadar Muluki khana" (Central Treasury) to the NRB. On 19 February 1960 NRB released its first bank notes in the denomination of Mohru 1. The Nepal Rastra Bank Act, 1955 and later, the Foreign Exchange Regulation Act, 1963 and Nepal's choice for a fixed exchange rate with Indian Currency along with supporting government policies contributed significantly in stabilising confidence in both the domestic currency and in exchange rate among the local traders. Additionally, during this decade, the national policy of relations with foreign institution were implemented which created the foundation for membership with international organization such as the International Monetary Fund (IMF) and the World Bank (WB) in 1961. Because of these policies, Nepal succeeded in the circulation of the new Nepalese rupee as the legal tender in Nepal's Terai region which was predominated by Indian currencies and facilitated for the elimination of the dual currency period in 1964 in the country and making Nepal independent in foreign currency exchange. Many financial institutions, such as Rastriya Banijya Bank, Rastriya Beema Sansthan, Nepal Co-operative Banks among others were gradually established to make the Nepalese economy more engaging and sustainable.

=== Industrialization of economy ===
In July 1959 Nepal Industrial Development Corporation started serving as an industrial finance organization to expand Nepalese industries and services, including hotels, and industrial estates. King Mahendra laid the foundation of economic development by building physical infrastructure with the help of foreign aid. The foundation for the Industrial Estates (IEs) was laid with the establishment of Balaju Industrial Area in 1963 with technical and financial assistance from the United States of America (USA). Patan Industrial Area, Hetauda Industrial Area, Dharan Industrial Area, Birgunj Sugar Mill, Nepal Oil Corporation, Janakpur Cigarette Factory, and Balaju Textile Industry were all established during his time. Salt Trading Corporation was established in 1963 with objective to make iodized table salt accessible to all citizens. Later, again to deal with the import and export for the purpose of rendering support to the economic development of the country Mahendra established National Trading Limited. On 12 March 1969 with the help of Chinese aid, Mahendra inaugurated Nepal's First Brick and Tile Factory in Harisiddhi which started its production two months later on April 29 1969. Similarly, Bansbari leather Shoe Factory was also established in 1965 with help of Chinese aid. Similarly, he started the era of stocks and bonds by issuing the first Government Bond in 1964. To providing a guaranteed market for milk to the rural farmers with fair price and for the purpose of economic advancement of the farming communities Dairy development corporation (DDC) was established in 1969.

During the Cold War, Nepal tried to boost the economy by creating an environment of economic cooperation between the two neighboring sides.

=== Contribution to health ===
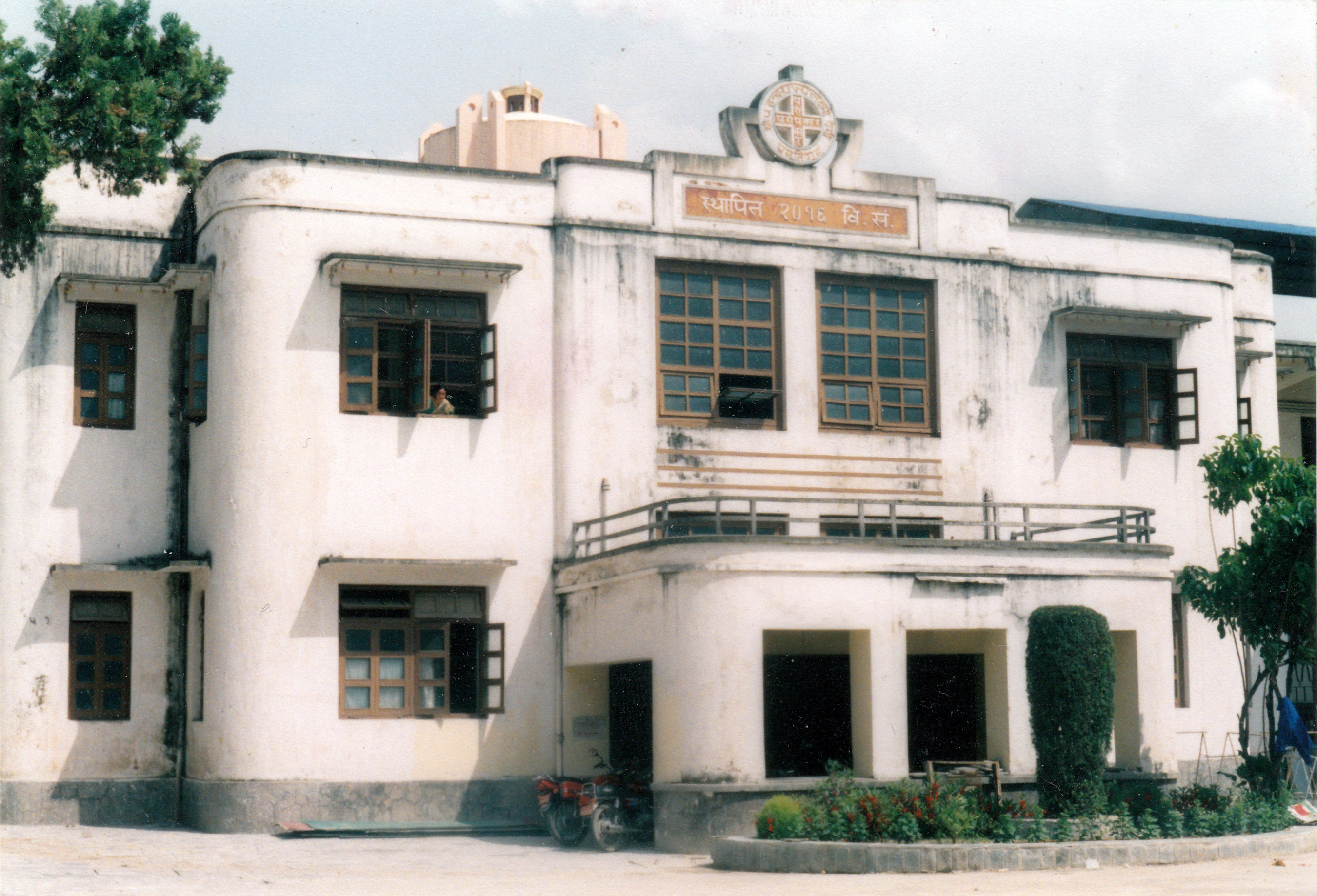
Prasuti Griha, the first maternity hospital of Nepal

The death of the first wife of King Mahendra due to birth complications led to the building of the kingdom's first maternity hospital, Paropakar Shree Panch Indra Rajya Lakshmi Maternity Hospital later renamed as Paropakar Maternity and Women's Hospital, commonly known as the Prasuti Griha, on the grounds of Charburja Durbar on 17 August 1959. Kanti Children's Hospital was established as a general hospital in 1963 with the economic aid from USSR and was later specialized mainly for children in 1968. In 1964 the Royal Drugs laboratory was established to perform scientific research and analysis of drugs as well as development of new drugs. Also, Nepal Ausadhi Limited was established in 1972 with technical collaboration with United Kingdom. In the same year, Institute of Medicine (IOM) was established under Tribhuvan University with the purpose of producing and training all categories of medical manpower required for the nation which immediately initiated courses for Auxiliary Nurse Midwives and Community Medical Assistants. The first ayurvedic school, Rajakiya Ayurvedic Bidyalaya was also established in this year.

Malaria Eradication Project in the Terai region was launched for the first time in 1958 with the help of USAID. After its success, several other projects to control and prevent smallpox, tuberculosis and leprosy were initiated in successive years. Programs to prevent nutritional disorders, and family planning, maternal and child health issues were also launched in successive years.

Various health centers were established between 1955 and 1958 such as in Dailekh (1955), Ramnagar Bhutaha, Sunsari (1956) and Chainpur, Sankhuwasabha (1957). Biratnagar Hospital, Dang Hospital and Baglung Hospital were also opened between 1955 and 1958. In 1958, government announced to build one health center in each 105 electoral constituency and announced to establish zonal hospitals in all 14 zones in 1961. Within this policy the numbers reached 32 for hospitals and 104 for health centers in the public sector in the year 1963.

Similarly in this period, hospitals funded by various NGO missions were established such as Scheer Memorial Hospital in Banepa (1957), Pokhara Shining Hospital in Kaski (1957), Amp Pipal Hospital in Gorkha (1957), Okhaldhunga Hospital in Okhaldhunga (1963), Bulingtar Hospital in Nawalparasi (1962) and United Mission Hospital in Palpa (1954), Anandban Leprosy Hospital in Patan (1963), Green Pasteur Hospital in Kaski (1957) and Dadeldhura Leprosy Hospital in Dadeldhura.

=== Agricultural development ===
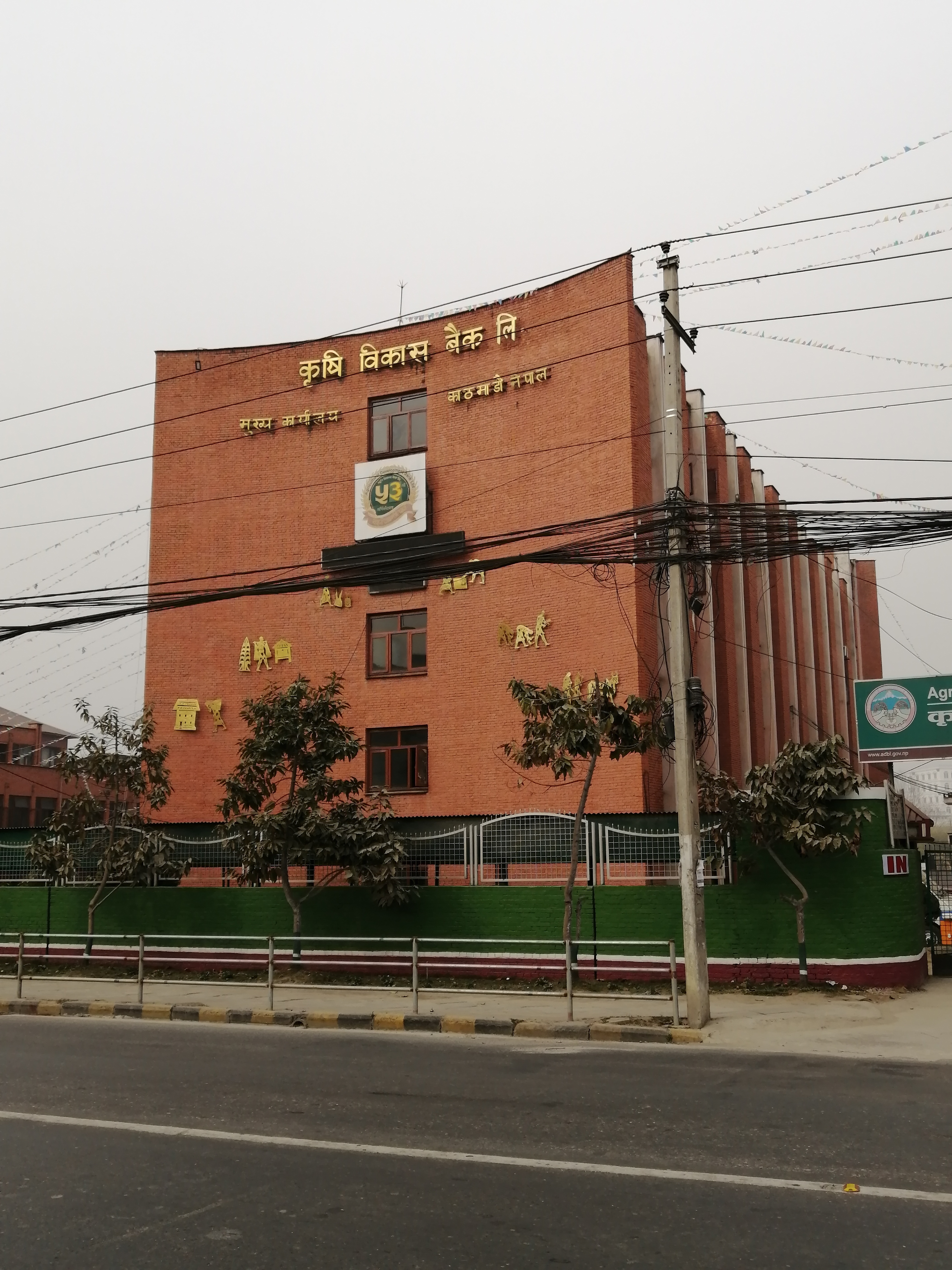
Agricultural Development Bank

To support animal husbandry and agriculture and to modernize the traditional agriculture Institute of Agriculture and Animal Science (IAAS) was established in 1957 as an independent institute for the motive of training agriculture technicians which was later brought under Tribhuvan University's management. In 1964, to process sugar from sugar cane, Birgunj Sugar Mill was established with economic aid from the then Soviet Union in Parsa. Visioning better future prospects of the Tea industry in Nepal, in 1965 a Tea plantation Estate, Soktim Tea was set up in the plains of Jhapa District. Nepal Tea Development Corporation was established in 1966 by Government of Nepal to aid the development of Tea industry. Agriculture Supply Corporation, which was later split into Nepal Food Corporation, Krishi Samagri Company Ltd. and National Seed Company Ltd was established in 1965 to distribute high quality agricultural inputs such as seeds, and agro-chemicals at a price accessible to the farmers across the country. In order to provide credit to farmers and people of rural areas, financial institutions dedicated to agriculture development, Agricultural Development Bank was established in 1967. This bank has also been executing Small Farmer Development Program (SFDP) for motive of poverty alleviation in rural areas. Agricultural Tools Factory was initially established in Birgunj in 1967 and later also in Biratnagar to produce required agricultural tools for the farmers in cheap cost within the country with the technical and economic aid of Soviet Union. Dhan Chamal Company was established to produce rice produced from the fields of newly extended agriculture region after the extinction of malaria in the Terai region. Eradication of Malaria in the Terai region and the land settlement programs contributed to a massive movement of population from the hills into the Terai, resulting in a large increase in the area devoted to agriculture.

In late 1950s King Mahendra gave a direct order to make feasibility studies of agricultural development in various parts of the country. In the early 1960s buckwheat and millet were the main agriculture products in Mustang, which were easy to produce but were extracting very little income since rice and wheat were the main products beyond its borders. The then government of Nepal invested in apple farming for the first time in several areas around the region like mustang and Baitadi, by setting up a regional agricultural outpost in 1966 which was later restructured as the Temperate Horticulture Development Center. Along with the horticulture expert Pasang Sherpa and help of the Nepali army, government tested different varieties of the fruit on various qualities parameters, while disseminating the most successful cultivated ones to local farmers. The technical and economic assistance provided to the farmers, as well as harvest and grooming tools and equipment promoted apples and agro products in Marpha, Jomsom and Thak Khola villages of Mustang which eventually introduced this region as the apple farmland of the country. According to the Companies Act, "The Timber Corporation of Nepal Limited" (TCN), later restructured as Nepal Forest corporation, was established in 1960 to systematically collect and chop firewood produced by forest management and supply it to the general public.

Cigarette was one of the major import during panchayat regime so people were encouraged to cultivate tobacco and Janakpur Cigarette Factory was established to make use of such tobacco and reduce the import of cigarette in the country.

=== Tourism development ===
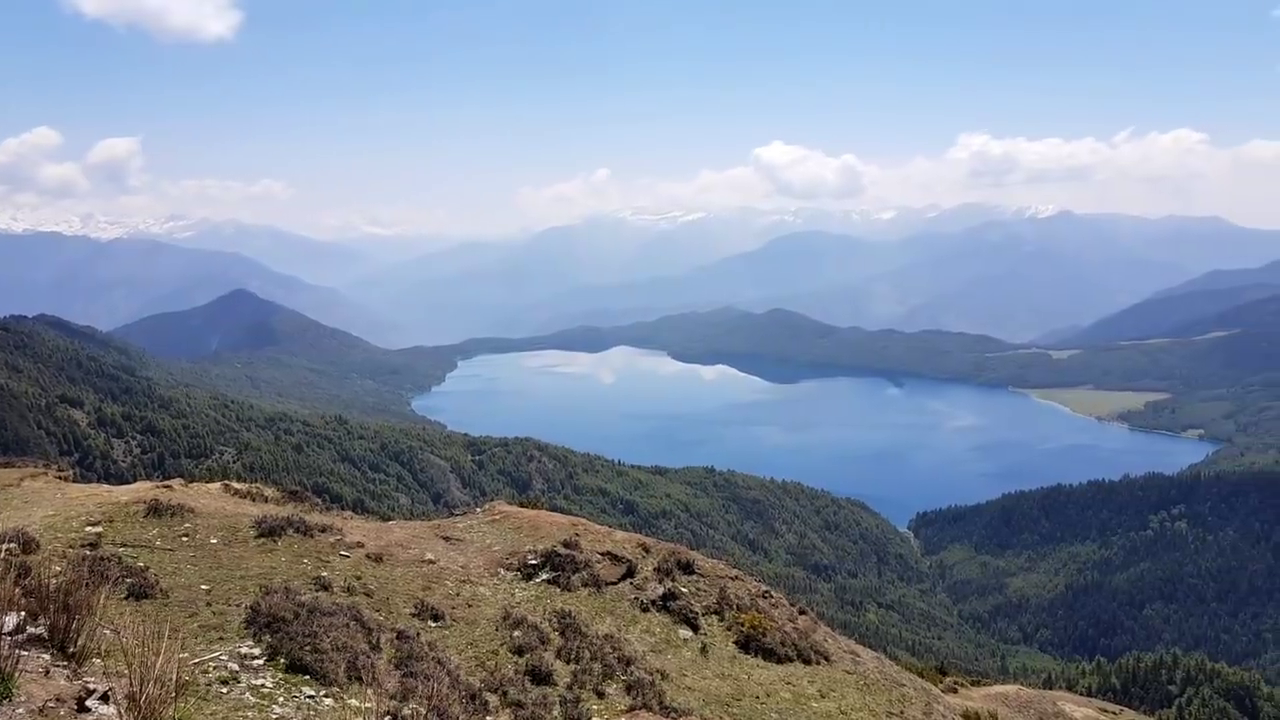
Rara lake, first described by Mahendra

He also focused on the development of tourism in Nepal. Under his reign, Nepal was first open to the foreign people laying the foundation of tourism in the nation. The first tourist group aside from the Foreign Diplomat and Bureaucrats arrived for the first time during his reign. In 1959 Nepal became the member of International union of Official travel organization, now known as World Tourism Organization. In the same year, a separate directorate for tourism was set up by the government and a general plan for organization of tourism of Nepal was prepared with cooperation with the Government of France. In 1960 the first handicraft exhibition was performed with the royal approval. In 1964 the King travelled to Rara Lake and penned his famous poem Rara Ki Apsara since he got mesmerized by beauty of Rara. His visit and the famous poem afterwards brought this lake to limelight and the reader of the poem started visiting the lake. The royal family established Soaltee hotel in 1965 and was inaugurated by King Mahendra in 1966. Similarly, Annapurna Hotel was also established in 1965 with cooperation with foreign diplomats and tourists by the royal family. The hotel tax act was first time devised in 1960 defining hotel, restaurants, casinos and bringing them under the jurisdiction of law. Also, the first professional trekking took place in 1960 when Mahendra opened the Himalayas to tourists for trekking. The first tourism act was enacted in 1964 with the motive of increasing foreign tourist and the first travel agency "Mountain Travel Nepal" was established immediately afterwards. With his initiation, Nepal association of Travel agents was established in 1966. In the same year, eight members of the hotels together established Hotel association of Nepal (HAN) which became one of the main contributors to governmental decisions making regarding tourism. The first casino for the purpose of promoting tourist was established during his reign in 1968. The five-year plan of 1965-1970 devised a plan to dedicate a commission for recognizing and promoting the tourism of the country. Under this plan, a high level Tourism development board was later established in 1969. After being member of the United Nations, King Mahendra invited the UN Secretary General U Thant to Nepal and involved him in the development of Lumbini as a birthplace of Gautam Buddha. With this initiation, a 13 nation International Lumbini development Committee was established in New York to develop the Ancient Lumbini area. It was in his time the famous Hippie trail started in Nepal and Nepal's existence started being known to the outside world. The famous Mahendra Cave in Pokhara got his name after he officially inaugurated it and since then it is one of the most visited places in Pokhara. In 1972 a tourism master plan was created emphasizing public-private partnership model with the view of creating more jobs and more revenue to the government. Under this master plan, Hotel management and tourism training center (HMTTC) was established with the economic and technical assistance of ILO and UNDP with the motive to produce skilled workers inside the country in 1972 which was later renamed as Nepal Academy of Tourism and Hotel Management. Later the establishment of Royal Nepal Airlines and opening of Himalayan trek for the first time brought more influx of tourist.

=== Transportation development ===
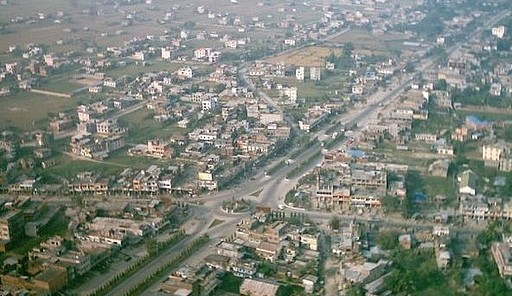
Mahendra Highway in Itahari

Earlier, Nepalis were compelled to travel via Indian territory while visiting from one district to another district. King Mahendra ended this situation by constructing a highway with foreign assistance. King Mahendra had initially requested India to build this highway. However, when India refused, he sought the help of the Soviet Union. India was also attracted after the road from Dhalkebar to Pathalaiya was built by Soviet Union, the Mechi section from Dhalkebar (Jhapa to Janakpur) was constructed by India, while the Hetauda-Narayanghat section was constructed by the Asian Development Bank, the Narayanghat -Butwal section by the United Kingdom and the Butwal-Kohalpur section by India. In 1961, King Mahendra laid the foundation stone for the construction of the Mahendra Highway (also called East-West Highway) at Gaindakot. The highway has greatly contributed to the all round socio-economic development of the country. In his efforts to diversify Nepal's connectivity beyond India, he created Kodari road link with China's Tibet Araniko Highway. India was furious when China said it would build the Kodari Highway. The highway construction was started in June 1963 and completed with Chinese aid in April 1967. Again, with the aid of Indian government, Tribhuvan Rajpath from Hetauda to Thankot was built. This Rajpath was famously known as "By road" when lots of Indians using this road to travel to Kathmandu. Similarly, another major Highway, the Prithvi Highway was also built under King Mahendra's plan in 1967. This highway connects Naubise near Kathmandu to Prithvi Chowk, Pokhara. Kanti Highway, a 92 Kilometer feeder road connecting Lalitpur to Hetauda was started in 1954 by King Mahendra. In 1964, with the help of USAID, Kathmandu-Hetauda ropeway was started to reduce the cost of goods transportation from India.

On 15 June 1955, Tribhuvan International Airport was inaugurated by Mahendra and later named it such in memory of his father. In 1957 the department of aviation was established and it started its first scheduled service in 1958. Nepal at the time lacked all weather and blacktopped airports, except the Tribhuvan International Airport, and for aviation to sustain, other airports were built, including airports in Bhairahawa (later renamed as Gautam Buddha Airport), Biratnagar, Bharatpur, Dhangadhi, Pokhara and Simara. In 1959 Rajbiraj Airport was officially inaugurated. Some of these airports were later mothballed.

In the same year, 1959, His Majesty's Government established Royal Nepal Airlines Cooperation (RNAC) as a public undertaking, although the required law, the Royal Nepal Airlines Corporation Act (now Nepal Airlines Corporation Act) was approved only in 1963, when King Mahendra enacted Nepal Airlines Corporation Act. Funds were temporarily transferred from construction of suspension bridges to the airline company when the Soviets promised to help with the civil aviation after the King's state visit to the Soviet Union. Under his leadership, Nepal became the member of ICAO in 1960. Janakpur Airport and Palungtar Airport was established in 1960 and Nepalgunj Airport and Meghauli Airport in the Chitwan District was established next year in 1961. Bhadrapur Airport was established in 1963, Surkhet Airport in 1966, Syangboche Airport at Solukhumbu was established in 1971 and Rumjatar Airport and Tumlingtar Airport established in 1972. After, the establishment of country own airlines, air service agreement was needed for which first air service agreement was made in 1963. Mahendra also established Sajha Bus Yatayat in order to provide cheap and accessible transport to the local people in 1961.

=== Buildings and structures ===
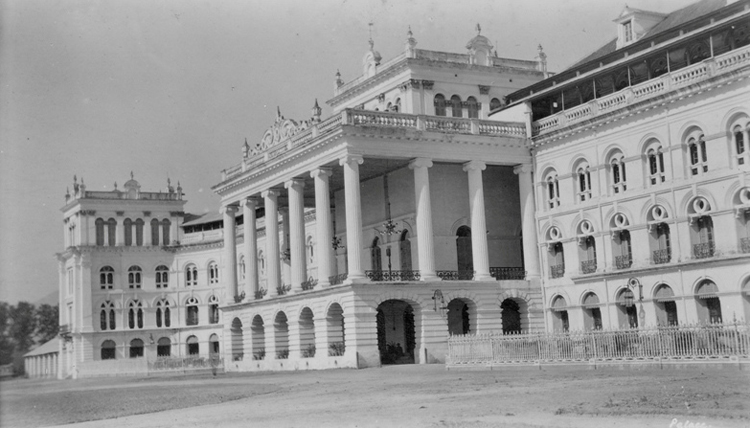
Old Narayanhiti Palace c. 1920, demolished in 1958

He built the modern Narayanhiti Palace after the demolition of the old palace from the old Rana architecture. King Mahendra also built Ratna Mandir, the Lakeside palace for Queen Ratna in 1956. Nepal's first golf course, the Royal Nepal Golf Club (RNGC) at Tilganga, Kathmandu, was inaugurated on September 5 1965 by him. He is also given credit for the construction of Dasrath Stadium in Kathmandu. Diyalo Bangla, a palace for the former royal family was constructed in Bharatpur, Chitwan to allow former royal family members to relax and hunt wild animals during their visit.

The Koshi River Barrage, a product of multiple ideas to control monsoon floods was constructed during his reign between 1959 and 1963 with the motive of irrigation of agricultural fields, flood control and generation of hydroelectricity. In 1959 King Mahendra and Indian prime minister Jawaharlal Nehru jointly inaugurated and laid foundation of Koshi Barrage. Koshi Barrage was believed to be biggest water project of South Asia at the time of its construction.

A similar dam, the Gandaki river dam was built between the period of 1959 to 1964 on the border between India and Nepal at Gandak for the purpose of flood control, irrigation and hydropower generation. Also, Trisuli dam was built in 1971. In 1956 the first 1728 KW diesel plant of the country was established for the coronation of king Mahendra which opened the door for supply of electricity to the public and made it more accessible. Hydro Power generated at Trishuli Hydropower Station, Sunkoshi Hydro Power Project, Panauti Hydro Power, Kulekhani Hydro Power are some of the few power projects built during King Mahendra's rule. He is also credited for the vision of Kathmandu water project also known as Melamchi Water Supply Project though his early demise could not bring the plan into implementation. The first bridge connecting Nepal with China was also built during his reign in 1964.

=== Educational reforms ===
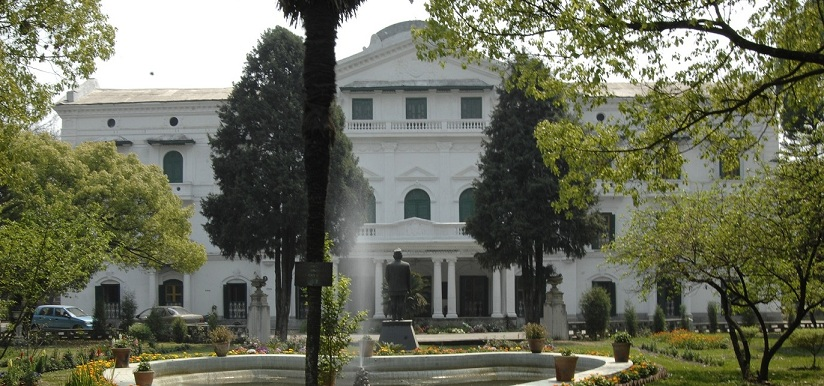
IOE, Central Campus, Pulchowk

At the beginning of king's reign the literacy rate of the country was estimated to be 5 percent and it reached 10 percent in 1960 while it reached 18 percent in 1971. After the 1960 coup, efforts were made to establish an education system. The All Round National Education Committee was established in 1961, and the National Education Advisory Board in 1968 in order to implement and refine the education system. Nepal's 1965 education plan and 1971 education plan hastened the educational development in the country. In the year 1971 it was King Mahendra who formulated the education policy of the nation and implemented it by making the Education Act. In this year, Nepal's own education came into operation as an integral part of the Fourth Five-Year Plan (1970–75) designed to address individual as well as societal needs towards the goals of national development. This new education system boycotted foreign books and education system. Furthermore, he wrote books named Mahendra Malla for schools to give priority to Nepal and Nepali language and boycotted Indian Books. The introduction of the first University of the country, Tribhuvan University was the landmark contributions made by King Mahendra in reforming education sector. At that time King Mahendra's family raised 16 lakh rupees by selling gold jewelries in order to fund the project. He later modernized Tribhuvan University, creating conditions for higher education in Nepal, and displaced Indian books from the curriculum. He also started production of books in Nepal with the introduction of Jana Shiksha Samagri Kendra Limited. King Mahendra's diplomacy also made arrangements to send Nepali students to study in Russia on scholarships.

As a memorial to his wife, one of the famous public college, Ratna Rajya Campus was established in Putalisadak, Kathmandu and its school was established in Taulihawa, Gorkha, Kathmandu and Mukundapur in 1961 during his reign. With the need to provide higher education institution for a growing settlement n Chitwan, Birendra Intermediate Arts College was established on 13 April 1965, later renamed as Birendra Multiple Campus. In order to produce skilled workers inside the country, Pulchowk Engineering Campus was established in 1966 with assistance from Government of India and Thapathali Engineering Campus was established in 1967 with technical assistance of Germany. Later in 1972, these two institutes were brought under the umbrella of Tribhuvan University to constitute the Institute of Engineering. These two engineering institution are still regarded as one of the best engineering institution in the county. The king was in forefront to bring women forward for participation in the society. With the heated discussion to bring women in the schools, a girl school was established in Dillibazaar, Kathmandu which was with effort of the King later converted in to a higher institution, Padma Kanya Campus, and moved to Baghbazar within a greater college premises and facilities

=== Information and communication development ===
The telephone service in the country was initially, exclusively aimed for use in the Palaces of feudal Rana rulers. However, since the day of coronation of King Mahendra, the first distribution of telephone line was made available to the general public. Beginning in 1959, with support from USAID, Nepal developed 1,000 telephone lines in the capital. It also established its first public exchange in 1962 and converted its manual exchange into the country's first automatic telephone exchange within 1964. In 1961 Rastriya Samachar Samiti commonly abbreviated as RSS, was established under the Rastriya Samachar Samiti Act with a view to facilitate news for newspapers and broadcasting media. It is still one of the major source of news and photos in the nation. Understanding the value of newspaper in spreading knowledge and information, he modernized Gorkhapatra and converted it from weekly newspaper it to a daily newspaper in 1961. Similarly, to address the English language influence and increment of foreign tourists, The Rising Nepal was established on 16 December 1965 by the then Panchayat Government. In 1971 Nepal received its first telex service. He increased tower infrastructures so that Radio Nepal could reach all corners of the country.

=== Political reforms ===
Former political division of Nepal: 14 zones and 75 districts

After the 1962 war between China and India, Chinese troops occupied mountain areas east and west of Nepal in an attempt to resolve border disputes with India by simply occupying disputed territories. The reversal, Indian armed force were deployed in the country's northern border. and Indian diplomats were involved in the ministry as well as every decisions made by the Nepalese Government. King Mahendra played an important role to oust the Indian armed force from Nepali territory. Moreover, there were multiple representatives from India claiming that Nepal cannot handle its foreign policy and defense policy on its own. King Mahendra removed all the Indian representatives and politicians from the ministry and only kept Nepalese representatives. He was the first king to introduce constitution as the fundamental law in the country. King Mahendra incorporated the phrase 'Hindu Kingdom' in the newly introduced constitution. He scientifically divided Nepal into 14 administrative zones with 75 districts in it. In order to perform proper administration and to secure decentralization of power to every zone, each zones were appointed a zonal commissioners. This was the first decentralization of power in history of Nepal. There were more than 4000 villages and 35 municipalities. Every village was divided into nine wards and every municipalities were divided between 9-35 wards as per the size of the town. During his rule an extensive legal and judicial reforms were carried out. In order to provide good governance and social justice to people he nullified Royal courts and introduced local courts in 1961 through introduction of two new acts Petty States and Rulers Act and royal court nullification act (Nepali: राज्य रजौटा ऐन, २०१७ र राज्य अदालत उन्मूलन ऐन, २०१७) and introduced Supreme court in Nepal on 21 May 1956. Even though royalty act removed, many rulers of the small kingdoms, it still recognized 17 small kingdoms including that of Salyan, Bajhang, Jajarkot, Mustang, Bhirkot, Malneta and Darna. King Mahendra publicly declared his will for rule of law in the nation. The Legal Practitioners Act, in 1968 was introduced to institutionalize this willingness of a systematic rule. He introduced the separation of power within the state by dividing legislative power to the Rastriya Panchayat, executive power to the Council of ministers and judicial power to the Supreme Court. The Commissions of Inquiry Act introduced in 1969 opened the legal means through which government could appoint various investigative committees for the purpose of making inquiries into matters of national importance He also established the Office of the Auditor General in Nepal by appointing the first auditor general in 1963 according to the Nepalese constitution of 1958. Section 77 and Section 78 of Part 13 of 1962 constitution provided a provision for establishment of Public Service Commission to employ and train government officials in the country. Section 78 (a b c) of Part 13 (a) of the same constitution made the arrangement of the Election Commission which later became the sole authority to regulate and conduct elections in the country.

=== Social reforms ===
In 1955 with the enactment of the Police Act, there were attempts to boost the morale of the army. National Police Academy was established under this act. The electricity produced in the country at the beginning was exclusively aimed for use in the Palaces of feudal rulers. However, since the day of coronation of King Mahendra in 1955, electricity became more open and accessible to the public. On 17 August 1963 a new legal code was promulgated replacing the Muluki Ain of 1854 with the new Muluki ain. The Muluki Ain (people's code) and made attempt to break untouchables, caste discrimination and policy of gender-discrimination. He then introduced the Nepal Civil Service Act to develop employee skills, ending the long era of the Panjani practice. Nepal Public Commission was established under this act for reforming and developing the civil service. This move ended the long-standing tradition of directly electing, dismissing and transferring government officials by the king and started the tradition of electing only eligible candidates. In 1963, a Central Police Training Centre was established to train and reform the police. Rajya reform abolished special privileges of some aristocratic elites in western Nepal. The new panchayat system managed to bring 50,000 to 60,000 people into a single system of representative government in a way that had been rendered impossible for the elite-based political parties. Nepal was able to carry out its second plan (1962–65) and third plan (1965–70), and to begin the Fourth Five-Year Plan (1970–75). He was also the first ruler to bring high class Brahmin rulers under the equal rule of punishment. His wife, Queen Ratna had huge love for children for which he desired to establish an orphanage, he provided 25 ropanies of land to establish the first orphanage of the country to Daya Bir Kansakar under the name of Paropkar Sansthan. Moreover, he became the first king to donate blood in Nepal in order to create awareness between people about blood donation. He was also concerned about illegal Indians entering the nation and taking benefit in the name of local, he introduced the system of citizenship in 1964.

=== Promotion of art, history and culture ===
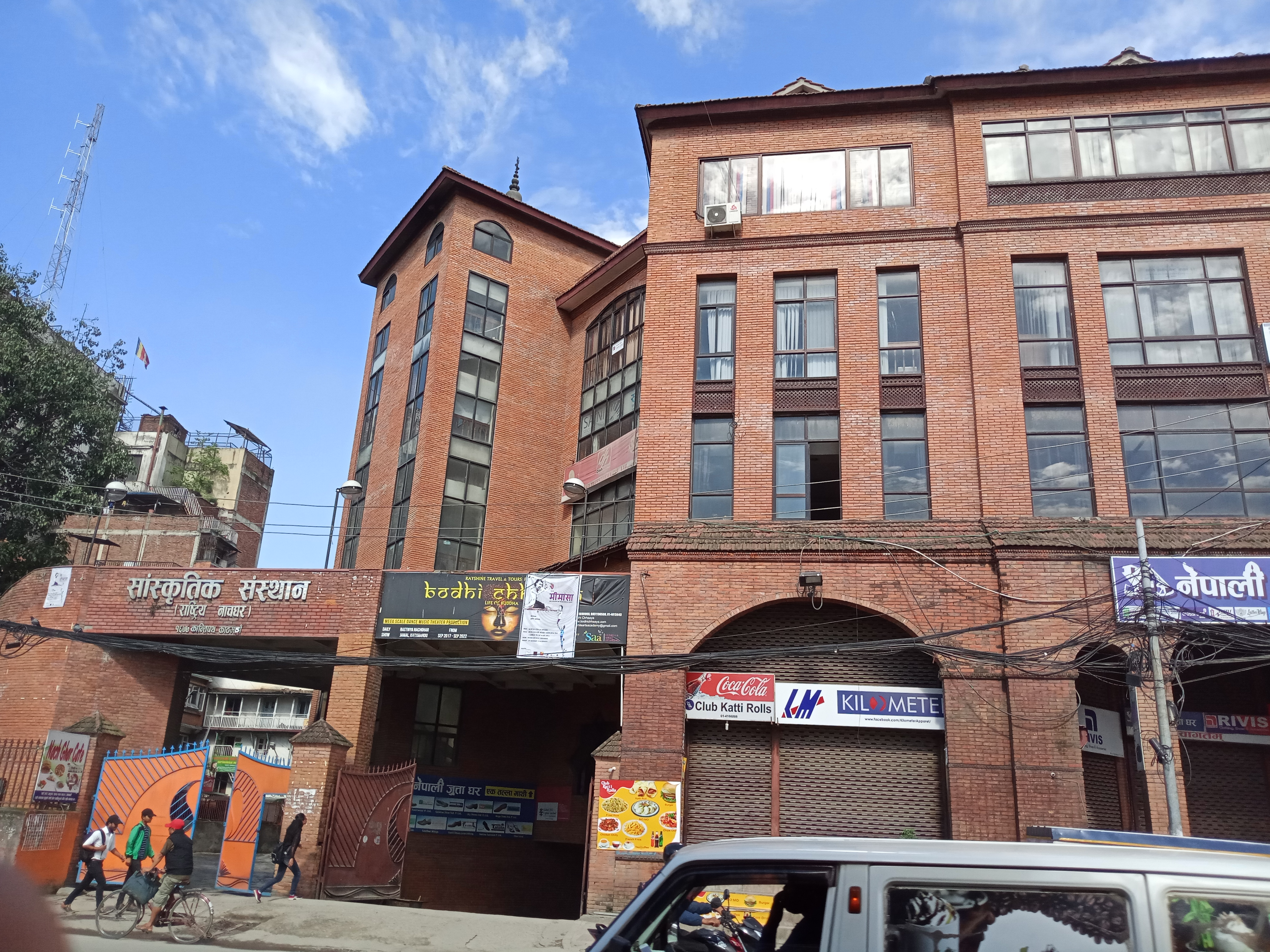
National Dance Academy

In order to preserve the local traditions, religion and culture, way of life, festivals and languages, he had established the Royal Nepal Academy (Nepali:- नेपाल राजकीय प्रज्ञा प्रतिष्ठान) and National Dance Academy (Nepali: राष्ट्रिय नाचघर) and other institutions. Royal Nepal Academy later renamed as Nepal Academy started translating foreign literature to Nepali language giving access to the people for foreign literature. In 1961, Nepal Association of fine arts later known as Nepal Academy of Fine Arts (Nepali: नेपाल ललित कला प्रज्ञा प्रतिष्ठान) was established. This along with Srijana Fine Arts School were some prominent established made to promote contemporary art in the nation. Furthermore, under the instruction of Mahendra, the government established Ratna Recording Sansthan to facilitate Nepali artists who otherwise were travelling to Calcutta for recording songs. This corporation paired with Radio Nepal to increase the reach of produced records of Nepali national music. King Mahendra was a great lover of Art. In his leadership National Numismatic Museum was established in 1962 to preserve the national history, art and culture. To promote the art and the artist in the nation, he conceived a Public-Private partnership organization and established Nepal Art Council in 1962. In 1962, Nepal Sahitya Sansthan was established to stimulate public's interest in art and culture through literature. In 1965, Panchayat Government initiated a program where actors and directors were sent to India for special training. Later, Mahendra Pragya Puraskar was introduced which awarded to contributors of Nepali language, arts and culture every two years. King Mahendra as a chancellor of Nepal academy started the tradition of All Nepal poetry competition on his birthday where winners are awarded with cash prizes. In 1966, on the personal request of Mahendra, the first private bannered Film, Maitighar was produced in the country. Mahendra wrote songs for the film and also provided some funding. In 1967, National archive was established to document and preserve the history and historical documents. Kaiser Library was established in 1969 when the ownership of Kaiser Shumsher Jung Bahadur Rana's history and books collection came under the ownership of the government. King Mahendra made this property accessible to the public with the donated personal collection by his widow Krishna Chandra Kumari Devi. In 1970, the king discussed with Dev Anand, an Indian actor, director and producer, to produce film in Nepal to promote the local cultural heritage and depict the hippie culture. The movie showcased the cultural heritage of the country to the world for the first time such as ancient Kasthamandap, Basantapur Durbar Square as well as Bhaktapur durbar square and showcased the hippie culture.

=== Promotion of religion ===
Royal Nepal Academy started translating religious text to Nepali and Sanskrit language giving access to the people for religious text.

The constitution introduced by King Mahendra in 1962 officially recognized Hindu religion as the state religion. In addition to that, it introduced national emblem such as crimson colour as the national colour, the cow as the national animal which had its root in Hinduism. The constitution guaranteed promotion of Hindu religious festivals and religious discourses including the use of Sanskrit and a ban on proselytizing. Being a state religion, Hinduism was promoted and protected under the expense of the state and prohibited the slaughter of the animal. Under his reign, the king and the queen was started being worshipped in every Nepalese homes as the incarnation of Vishnu.

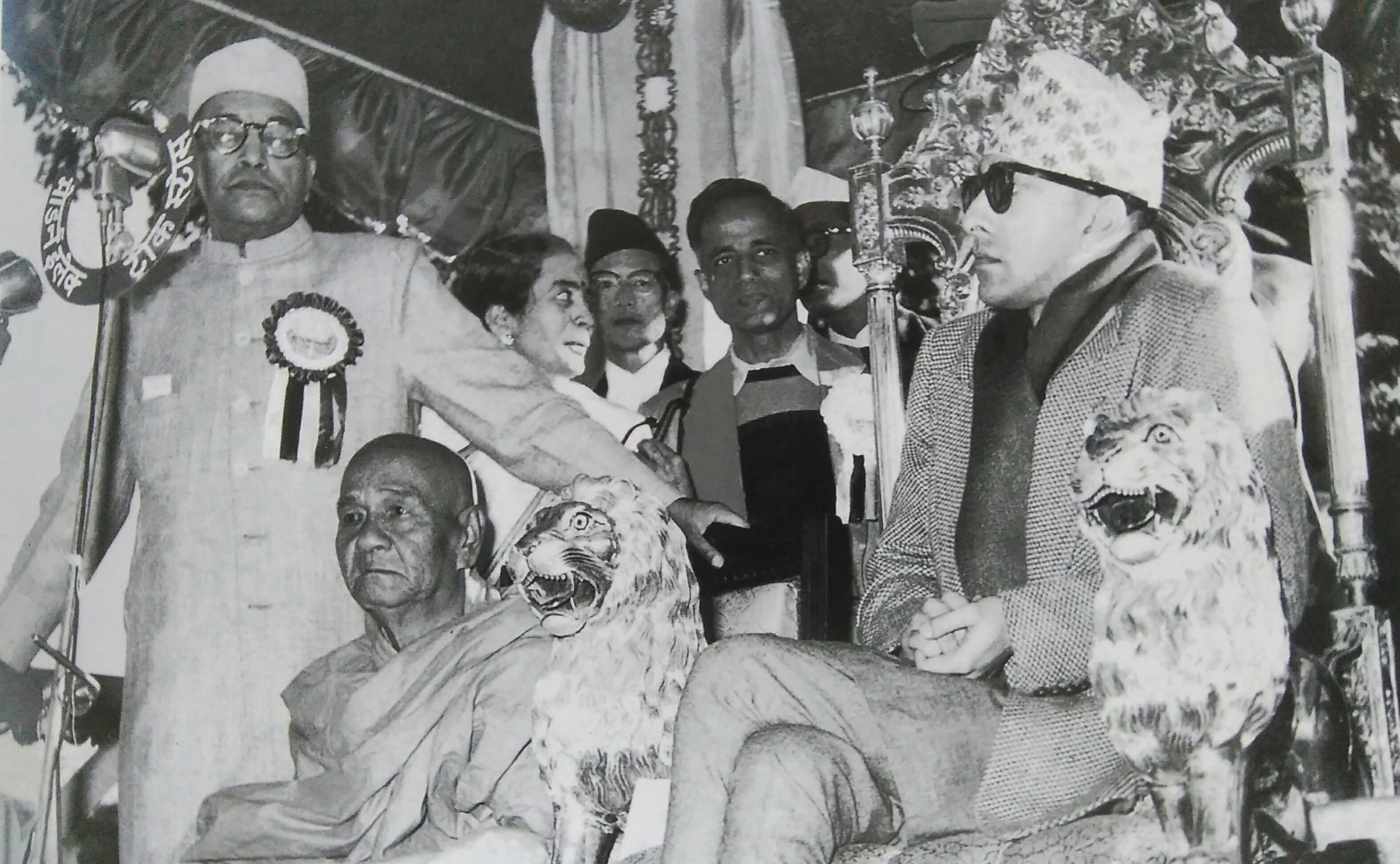
King Mahendra attending the promotional conference of Buddhism held at Kathmandu

After being member of the UN, King Mahendra invited the UN Secretary General U Thant to Nepal and involved him in the development of Lumbini as a birthplace of Gautam Buddha.

In 1962 King Mahendra set up a Guthi Sansthan with the objectives to continue preservation and promotion of festivals, heritage and culture of the people. During the kings reign, Sikhism flourished in Nepal as a number of Sikhs entered Nepal as a businessman with the permission of the king. King Mahendra was the one to provide first citizenship to Sikhs for their help during the drought in 1960s. During his entire rule, he enhanced the religious responsibilities of the royal family and enhanced the ritual status of the king in the society by routinely referencing himself in his speeches and writings "as the last remaining Hindu king of the world". He also promoted Dashain as a religious practice to integrate the entire state through integration of the local leaders into national government. All local and regional leaders were expected to receive Tika from the hands of the king and similarly from their bureaucratic superior and thus dispensing the political hierarchy from the center to all the corners of the country. Dashain embraced the vision of the panchayat regime to create a religiously and ethnically homogeneous society which accepted an hierarchical system with the king at its center to bring the country into a single integrated unit.

=== Land reforms ===
In 1959 the Birta Abolition Act was enacted which gave poor people and farmers ownership to the land they were historically working on. Birta land was then converted into Raikar through this act. Similarly, the Land Survey and Measurement Act was introduced in 1962. It classified land as Abal, Doyam, Sim, and Chahar. This act effectively established a Land Administration Office (Nepali:भूमि प्रशासन कार्यालय). The Agricultural Reorganization Act, passed in 1963 emphasized security for tenant farmers and put a ceiling on landholdings. Likewise, land reform act 1964 ended the feudal land ownership practice and secured the right of farmers. This land reform policy led to the confiscation of large Rana estates and provided land to many landless people. In the meantime, the Land Administration Act, 1966 was promulgated which further reformed the land administration office changing it into Land Revenue office(Nepali: मालपोत कार्यालय). Moreover, He had provided accommodation to ex- soldiers who knew how to wield weapons and to Nepalese who were expelled from Burma and set up settlements of Nepalis in the Terai from Jhapa to Kanchanpur so that the Indians would not oppress them. He also provided passport to the people of Manang region and waived custom duty for them so that the people of the region could use their lands to grow herbs and trade in the nearby regions. Eradication of Malaria and the land settlement programs contributed to a massive movement of population from the hills into the Terai, resulting in a large increase in the area devoted to agriculture.

== Criticisms ==
=== Dismantling of democracy ===
Mahendra seized power after dissolving the government of Nepali Congress, jailed any objectors and moved steadily towards an authoritarian rule. He considered political parties anti-national elements and put a complete ban on them in favor of a partyless system. While he believed himself to be a supporter of democracy and considered the Panchayat system to be a democratic regime, the claim was rejected by many. He also criticized and objected to King Tribhuvan's decision to accept a multiparty democracy and an arrangement for a constituent assembly. Mahendra once said, "The constitution is given by the King. It is not supposed to be made by the people." (translated from Nepali).

=== Authoritarianism ===
Mahendra gave himself absolute power following the coup and tried to establish his image as a patriotic and benevolent ruler. He suppressed all his critics and launched a propaganda campaign through radio, newspapers and pamphlets that boosted his popularity among the people and established himself as a god-like figure. Critics also see his one-country one-language one-monarch policy as the height of his abuse of authority. Some people also claim that his introduction of the reformed Muluki Ain was not to bring equality in the society but rather to give death sentences to the Brahmin leaders of rebellions who had tried to assassinate him.

Some critics claim that Mahendra stole the development plans of B.P Koirala and credited himself as the architect of the developmental process of the era. Mahendra made a conscious effort to consolidate his hold over the Nepalese Army.

=== "One-Country, One-monarch, One-language, One-dress" policy ===
Mahendra's efforts to unite the multicultural country under a singular culture have faced heavy criticism from progressives. The system equated the identity of the country with the Nepali as the language, the Daura-Suruwal as the national dress and Hinduism as the national religion. Everyone was required to wear a Dhaka topi for official purposes: to acquire their citizenship, passport, and driving license. This was criticized to be one sided as it dominated a country with pluralism and completely ignored the existence of the many minority groups within the country. This policy was disseminated in the Nepali language textbooks titled as 'Mahendramala' during the Panchayat era.

=== Accusations of creating an institution favoring the rich ===
Many critics consider the Panchayat system to be an institution that innately favored the rich and Mahendra to be the patron saint of the feudal lords and landlords of the country. Ganesh Man Singh criticized the establishment of the Nepal Rastra Bank saying, "The Central Bank, opened for the benefit of landlords and right-wing traders, does not benefit the poor." (translated from Nepali) Some also argue that the 1960 coup happened because the then BP Koirala government could not keep the feudal lords happy.

=== Memorial constructions ===
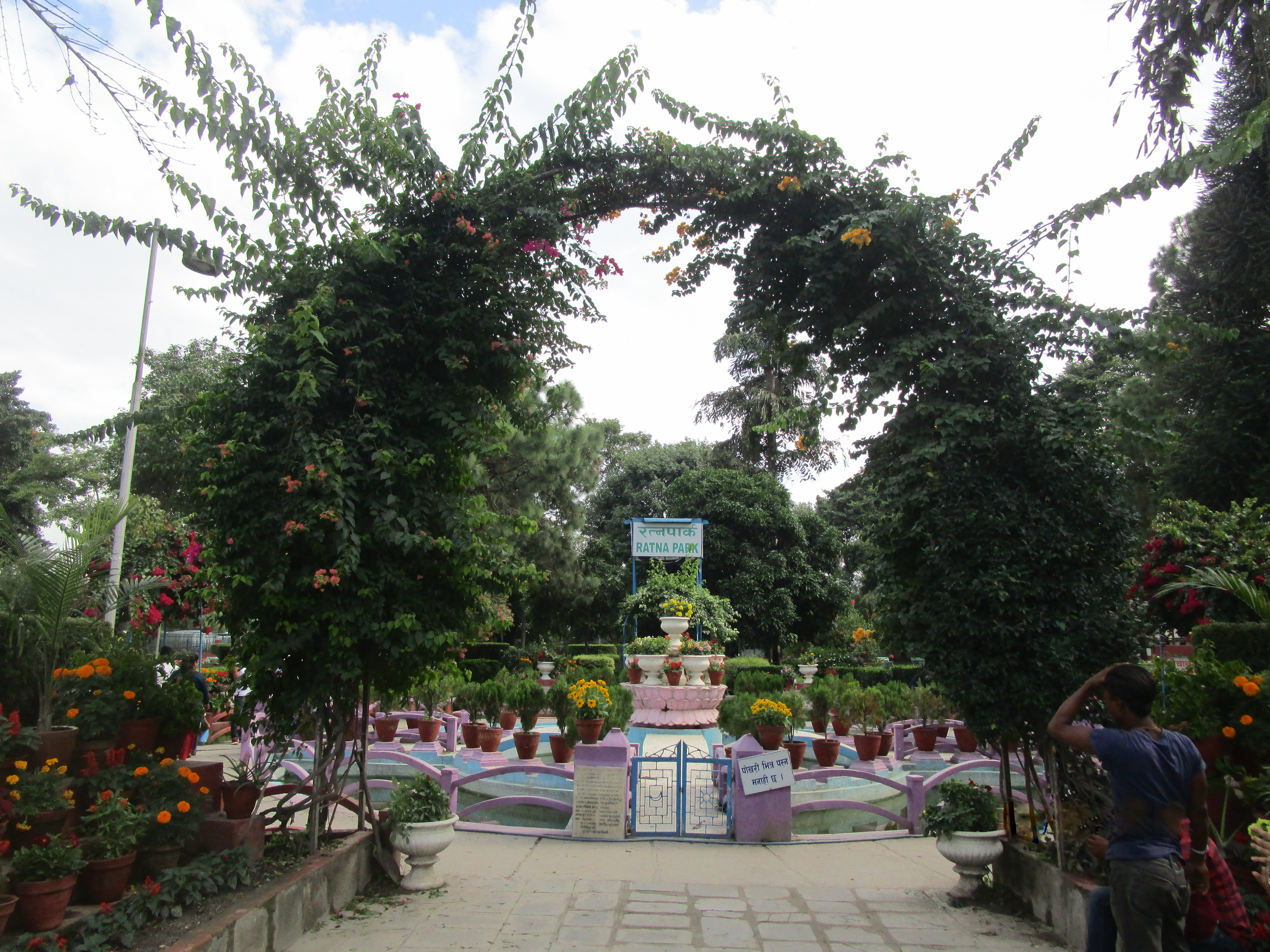
Ratna Park entrance

Mahendra was criticized for constructing various memorials and statues for himself and his wife and for naming various landmarks, schools and parks after him and his family members. Ratna Park, named after King Mahendra's wife Rani Ratna, a prime example of it. The statue of Queen Ratna Rajya Lakshmi Devi at Ratnapark was vandalised by republican protestors in 2006. The Kathmandu Metropolitan City changed the name of the park to Shankdhar Udyan in 2020 and erected a statue of Sankhadar Shakwa instead of the one of Queen Ratna. Similarly, naming various development projects like Prithvi Highway, Mahendra Highway, Kanti Highway, Tribhuvan Airport, etc. after their family members was seen as his attempt to improve the image of the royal family among the common people.

=== Failed land-reform policy ===
The land-reform policy introduced by Mahendra is considered to be a major failure by many people. Land reform efforts began with the enactment of the Land and Cultivation Record Compilation Act (1956), through which the government began compiling tenant records and continued with the Lands Act (1957). These acts were not much successful in increasing small farmers so further efforts had to made. The Agricultural Reorganization Act, passed in 1963 emphasized security for tenant farmers and put a ceiling on landholdings. Likewise, land reform act 1964 ended the feudal land ownership practice and secured the right of farmers. However, there were loopholes in the acts which allowed landlords to control most of the lands. Though, these policies were successful in securing the rights of farmers, it was not so in the case of land redistribution. Until 1972, average landholdings remained small. Moreover, the double ownership law of land introduced by the Panchayat through 'Mohiyai hak' became a major hindrance in development in the decades to come.

=== Child-less second marriage ===
After the death of his first wife Indra Rajya in 1950, Prince Mahendra had a love affair with his sister-in-law Ratna, but despite strong opposition from his father King Tribhuvan, Prince Mahendra married Ratna Rajyalakshmi two years later. This strained relations between him and his father. Mahendra has faced much criticism for this marriage. Some people criticise him for disobeying his father and disregarding the obedience of a prince to the King of Nepal. Some people also criticise him for sterilising his new wife before marriage and depriving his wife of her right to be a mother.

== Death and succession ==
Mahendra suffered a massive second heart attack whilst on a winter hunting trip in Chitwan where he was attended to by his trusted physicians Dr Mrigendra Raj Pandey and Dr Sachey Kumar Pahari. King Mahendra was in a stable but critical condition and eventually died at Diyalo Bangala, the royal palace in Bharatpur on 31 January 1972. His body was subsequently flown to Kathmandu by helicopter in preparation for the state funeral.

His 26-year-old son Birendra ascended the Nepalese throne immediately after his father's death. However, his coronation took place only on 24 February 1975 at the age of 29 due to Hindu ritual for an auspicious date and the astrologers had claimed only that time to be auspicious.

== Personality ==
Historians define Mahendra as an ambitious ruler. He was courageous and visionary who would not be reluctant to take any steps. Swiss scholar, Toni Hagen described him as very clever ruler who could handle delicate issues. He was a deep admirer of Nepalese literature, art and culture which led to himself composing several poems which were later sung by many famous singers. He was proficient in Nepali, English, Hindi and Sanskrit.

== Hobbies ==
Mahendra went in for various activities like noblemen of his era and subsequent eras. MBB Shah (Nepali: म. वी. वि. शाह) is the literary name of King Mahendra, MBB Shah is a more passionate poet of the romance section of Nepali poetry, King Mahendra wrote various lyrics and poems. He is also called the first lyricist of Nepal by some sources. He penned Lolayeka Ti Thula, Gajalu Ti Thula Thula Aakha, Garchin Pukar Aaama, Aakashma Tirmire,, Kina Kina Timro Tasbir,, Ma mare pani mero desh bachi rahos,, Rara ki Apsara and other songs, which were later sung by Ghulam Ali and Lata Mangeshkar. He was also fond of hunting and would regularly go to hunting with Queen Ratna to different places.

== Offspring ==
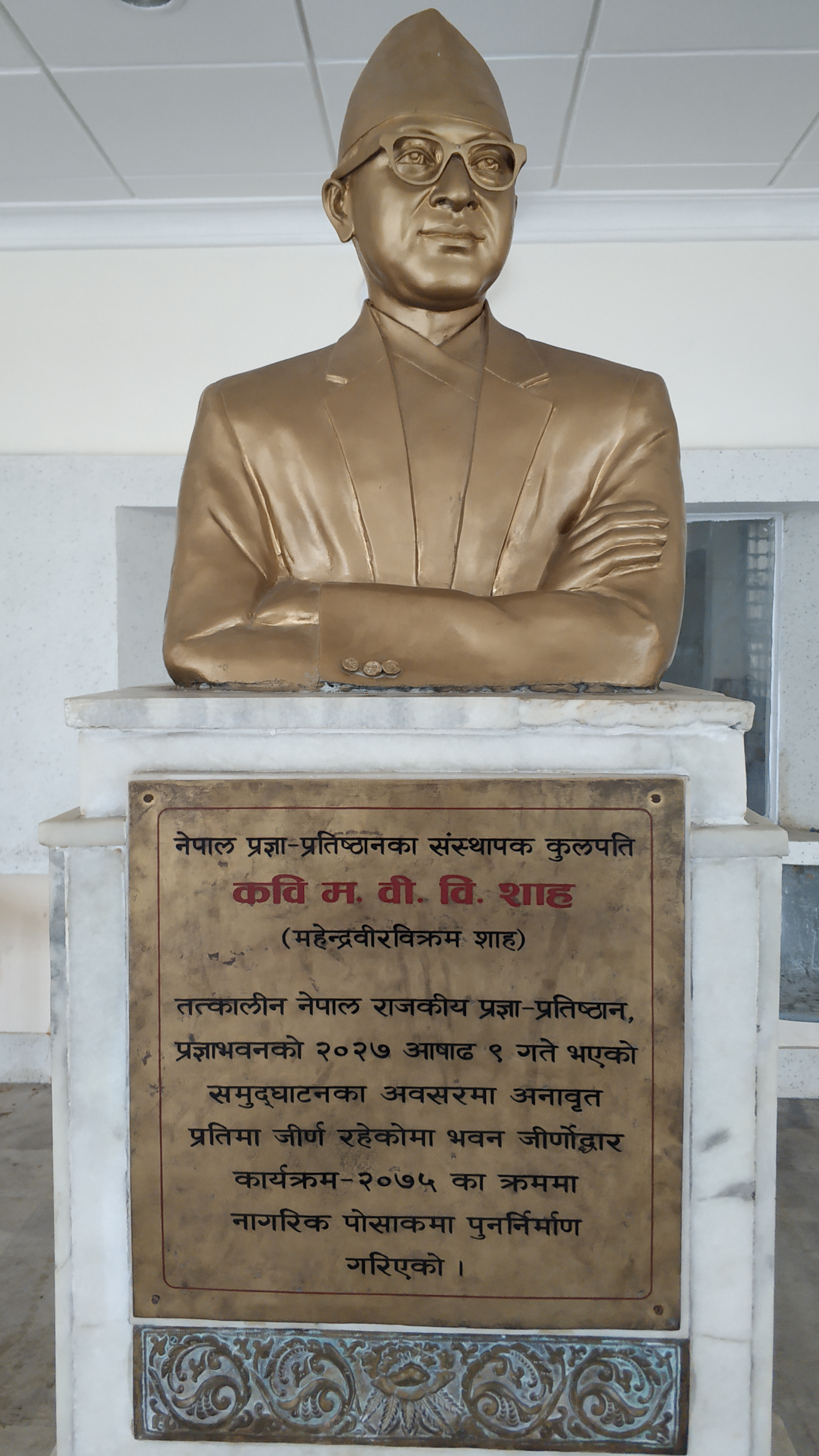
Nepal Academy's founding chancellor poet म. वी. वि. शाह's half bodied statue

| Name | Birth | Death | Spouse | Children |
|---|---|---|---|---|
| Rajkumar (Note: Royal Son, title borne by the sons of a Nepalese King by a lesser wife or concubine.) Rabindra Bikram Shah | July 1939 | 7 October 1997 (aged 58) | Chanda Rajya Lakshmi | 1) Pabindra Bikram Shah; 2) Rochana Rajya Lakshmi; 3) Sirjana Rajya Lakshmi |
| Princess Shanti | 20 November 1940 | 1 June 2001 (aged 60) | Deepak Jang Bahadur Singh | 1) Binod Singh; 2) Pramod Singh; 3) Chhaya Devi |
| Princess Sharada | 2 February 1942 | 1 June 2001 (aged 59) | Khadga Bikram Shah | 1) Bikash Bikram Shah; 2) Deebas Bikram Shah; 3) Ashish Bikram Shah |
| King Birendra | 29 December 1945 | 1 June 2001 (aged 55) | Queen Aishwarya | 1) King Dipendra; 2) Princess Shruti; 3) Prince Nirajan |
| King Gyanendra | 7 July 1947 (age 79) | Living | Queen Komal | 1) Crown Prince Paras; 2) Princess Prerana |
| Princess Shova | 17 January 1949 (age 77) | Living | Mohan Bahadur Shahi | 1) Himvan Shahi; 2) Manuja Shah |
| Prince Dhirendra | 14 January 1950 | 1 June 2001 (aged 51) | 1) Princess Prekshya; 2) Jaya Pandey; 3) Shirley Greaney | 1) Princess Puja; 2) Princess Dilasha; 3) Princess Sitashma; 4) Shreya Shah; 5) Ushaana Laela Shah |

Four of his children were killed in the 2001 royal massacre. Other than his six children, King Mahendra also had a son, Rabindra Bikram Shah (1939–1997), from one of his concubine Gita Gurung, who was born before any other child from his legal marriage. Gita, a Gurung lady from northern Nepal, worked in the royal palace as a servant when Mahendra was a prince.

== Memorial ==
Many structures, institutions, locations and honors have been built and introduced in the memory of King Mahendra. Monuments erected in his name were renamed after the restoration of the parliament in 2006 and the end of the monarchy in 2008. After the political changes of 2006, an attempt was made to rename the highway built in the name of the king as Lok Marg. Even though the Ratna Park named after his queen was renamed as Shankhadhar Sakhwa Park, Ratna Park is still popular among the people. A species of groundhopper (Orthoptera: Tetrigidae) discovered from Shivapuri Nagarjun National Park by a team led by Nepali researcher Madan Subedi has been named after King Mahendra as Skejotettix mahendrai Subedi, Kasalo, & Skejo, 2024, commonly known as "Royal Groundhopper".

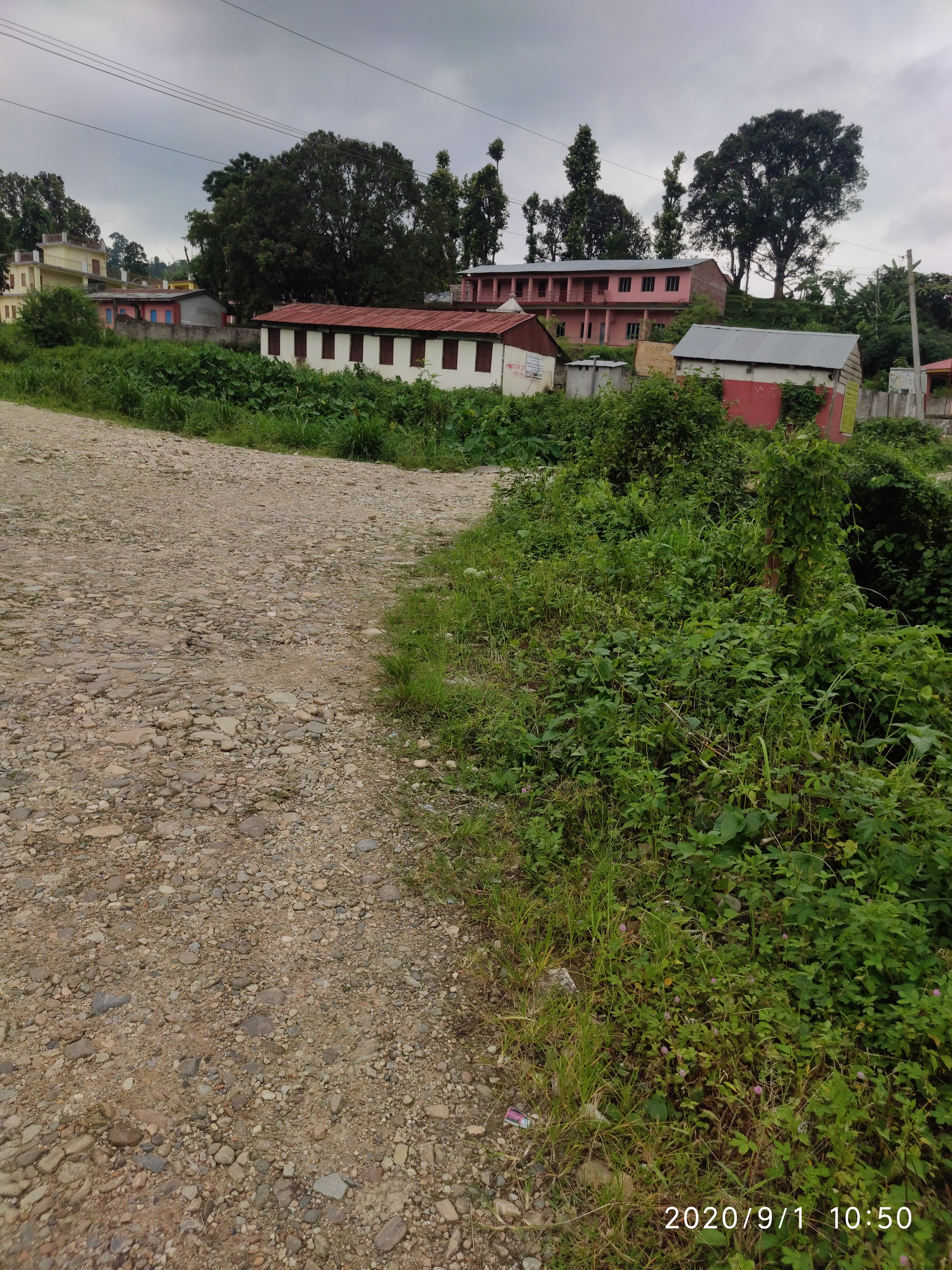
Mahendra jyoti school, Handikhola village

=== Bagmati Province ===
1. Shree Mahendra Kiran Higher Secondary School, Manahari (Makwanpur)
2. Shree Mahendra Higher Secondary School, Chhatiwan (Makwanpur)
3. Shree Mahendra Jyoti Higher Secondary School, Handikhola (Makwanpur)
4. Mahendra Chowk, Hetauda
5. Shree Mahendra Secondary, Padampokhari (Hetauda)
6. Mahendra Kiran Higher Secondary School (Hetauda)
7. Mahendra Mriga Kunja (Mahendra Deer Park) Chitwan
8. Shree 5 Mahendra Memorial Eye Hospital, Bharatpur, Chitwan
9. Mahendra Bus Park, Chitwan
10. Shree Mahendra Higher Secondary School,Chaturale (Nuwakot)
11. Shree Mahendra Higher Secondary School,Charghare (Nuwakot)
12. Shree Mahendragram Higher Secondary School, Nagarkot
13. Mahendra Jyoti Village Development Committee
14. Mahendra Higher Secondary School, Sanga, Banepa
15. Shree Mahendra Higher Secondary School, Kunchok, Sindhupalchok
16. Shree Mahendra Secondary School, Ichok, Sindhupalchok
17. Mahendra Pratap Secondary School, Dhuskun, Sindhupalchok
18. Shree Mahendra Higher Secondary School, Nilkantha, Dhading
19. Shree Mahendrodaya Secondary School, Dhading

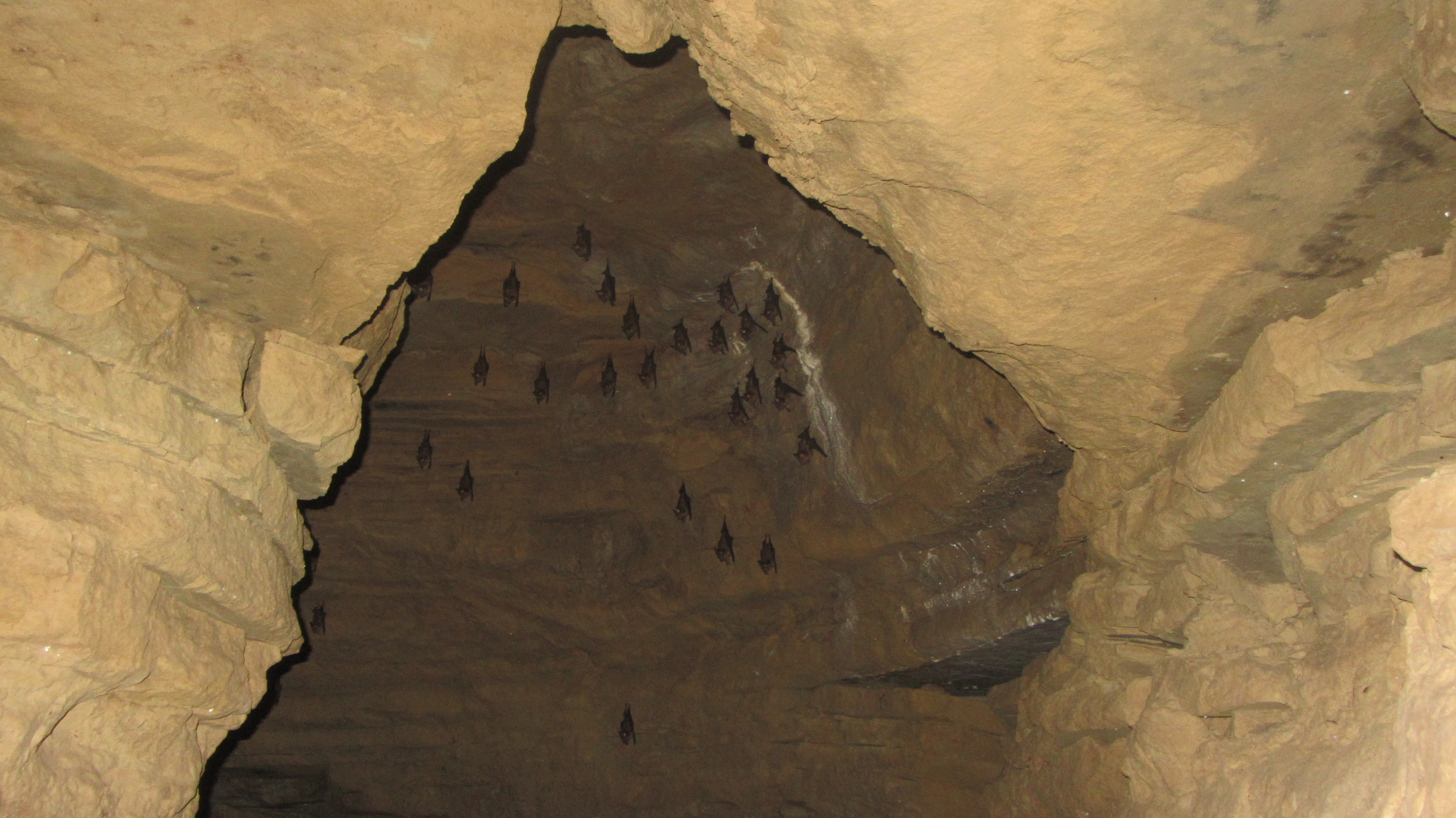
Mahendra Cave named after Mahendra

=== Gandaki Province ===
1. Shree Mahendra Secondary School, Narethanti (Baglung)
2. Mahendra statue, Humde (Manang)
3. Mahendra Chowk, Putalibazar, (Syangja)
4. Shree Mahendra secondary school, Malyangkot, (Syangja)
5. Mahendra Cave, Pokhara
6. Shree Mahendra Secondary School, Pokhara lekhnath (Pokhara)
7. Mahendra Secondary School, Naya Bazar (Pokhara)
8. Mahendra Secondary School, Bhalam, (Pokhara)
9. Mahendrapul, Pokhara
10. Mahendra Multiple Campus, Pokhara
11. Mahendra statue, Bhraga (Manang)
12. Mahendra Jyoti Secondary School, Lunkhu Deurali, (Parbat)
13. Shree Mahendra Shikhari Secondary School, Bajung, (Parbat)
14. Shree Mahendra Shakti Secondary School, Bakrang, (Gorkha)
15. Shree Mahendra Leela Secondary School Siranchok, (Gorkha)
16. Mahendra Jyoti school, (Gorkha)
17. Mahendra Jyoti Secondary School, Durbar Marga, (Gorkha)
18. Shree Mahendra Secondary School, Sukhaura (Baglung)
19. Shree Mahendra Jyoti Higher Secondary School, Shyamgha, (Tanahu)
20. Shree Mahendra Secondary School, Lahachowk, Kaski
21. Shree Mahendra Mandir Secondary School, Sundarbazar, (Lamjung)
22. Mahendra High school, Barangja, (Myagdi)
23. Mahendra Higher Secondary School, Jagat Bhanjyang, Syangja

=== Karnali Province ===
1. Mahendra Daha
2. Shree Mahendra Higher Secondary School, Chhiwang, (Rukum)
3. Shree Mahendra higher secondary school, Dullu (Dailekh)

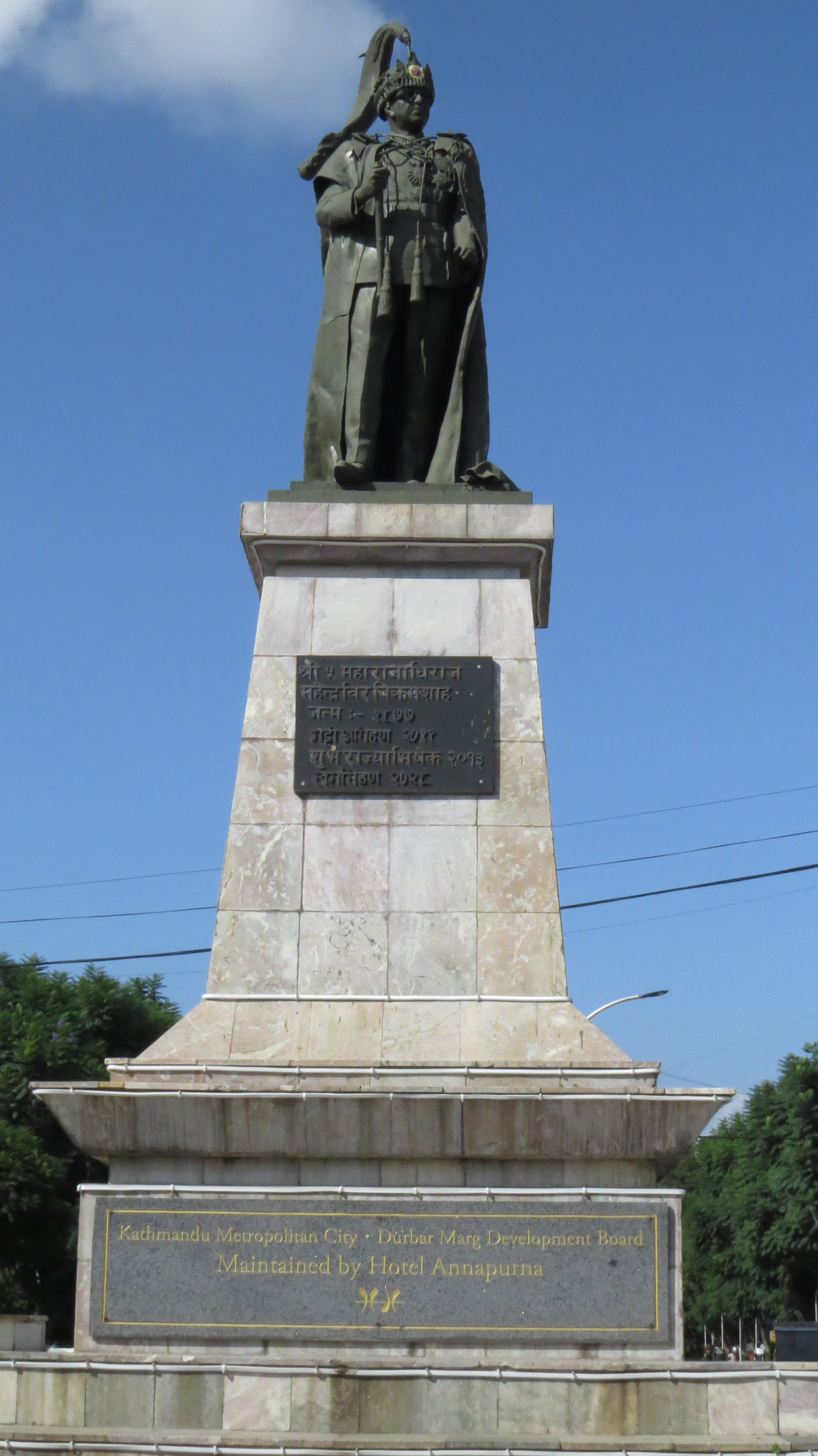
Mahendra statue (Durbar Marg)

=== Kathmandu Valley ===
1. Mahendra Bhawan Higher Secondary Boarding School, Gyaneshwor, (Kathmandu)
2. Mahendra statue, Durbar Marg, (Kathmandu)
3. Mahendra statue, Kaalimati, (Kathmandu)
4. Mahendra statue, Pashupatinath temple, (Kathmandu)
5. Mahendra Park, Balaju, (Kathmandu)
6. Mahendra Ratna Campus
7. Mahendra statue, Hanuman Dhoka
8. Mahendra Bhawan Girls' Higher Secondary Boarding School, (Kathmandu)
9. Mahendra Museum, Hanuman Dhoka
10. Mahendra Rastriya Secondary School, Baluwataar,(Kathmandu)
11. Mahendra statue as M.B.B shah (Nepal Academy)
12. Mahendra Adarsha Vidhyashram College, Lalitpur
13. Shree Mahendra Adarsha Higher Secondary School, Mahalaxmi, Lalitpur
14. Mahendra Adarsha Vidhyashram Secondary School / College, Satdobato, Lalitpur
15. Mahendra Manzil, Narayanhiti Palace
16. Shree Mahendra Gram Secondary School, Tikathali, Lalitpur
17. Mahendra Bhawan Marga, (Kathmandu)
18. Shree Mahendra Shanti Secondary School, Balkot,(Bhaktapur)
19. Mahendra Bhrikuti Secondary School, Lalitpur
20. Mahendra Adarsha Marga, Lalitpur
21. Mahendra Boudha Secondary School, Kathmandu
22. Shree Mahendra Gram Higher Secondary School, Changunarayan, Bhaktapur
23. Mahendra Secondary School, Shankharapur, Kathmandu
24. Shri Mahendra Saraswati Sewa Lower Secondary School, Teku, Kathmandu

=== Lumbini Province ===
1. Shree Mahendra Secondary School, Krishnanagar, Kapilvastu
2. Mahendra Chowk, Butwal
3. Shree Mahendra Secondary School, Banganga, Kapilvastu
4. Mahendra Stadium, Nepalgunj
5. Mahendra Park, Nepalgunj
6. Mahendra Multiple Campus, Nepalgunj
7. Mahendra Airport, Nepalgunj
8. Shree Mahendra Higher Secondary School, Mallarani, (Pyuthan)
9. Mahendra Higher Secondary School, (Pyuthan)
10. Mahendra Multiple Campus, Dang
11. Shree Mahendra Higher Secondary School, Dang
12. Mahendra Sanskrit University, Dang
13. Shree Mahendra Secondary School, Somani, (Nawalparasi)
14. Shree Mahendra Secondary School, Sarawal, (Nawalparasi)
15. Mahendra Hospital, Ghorahi, Dang
16. Mahendra Higher Secondary School, Tulsipur, Dang
17. Mahendra Model Secondary School. Tamghas,(Gulmi)
18. Mahendra Adarsha School, Wamitaksar, (Gulmi)
19. Shree Mahendra Higher Secondary School, Kerunga, Arghakhanchi
20. Mahendra Bodi Higher Secondary School, Tansen, Palpa

=== Madesh Province ===
1. Shree Mahendra secondary school, Singyahi, Mahottari
2. Mahendra Adarsha Village Development Committee
3. Mahendranagar town, Dhanusha
4. Mahendra Chowk, Jaleshwor, Mahottari
5. Mahendra Janata H.S. School, Karmaiya, Sarlahi
6. Shri Mahendra National Higher Secondary School, Ramgopalpur, Mahottari
7. Shree 5 Mahendra higher secondary school, khadak, (Saptari)
8. Shree Paanch Mahendra Chunni Secondary School, Manraja, Saptari
9. Mahendra Bindeshwari Multiple Campus (Saptari)

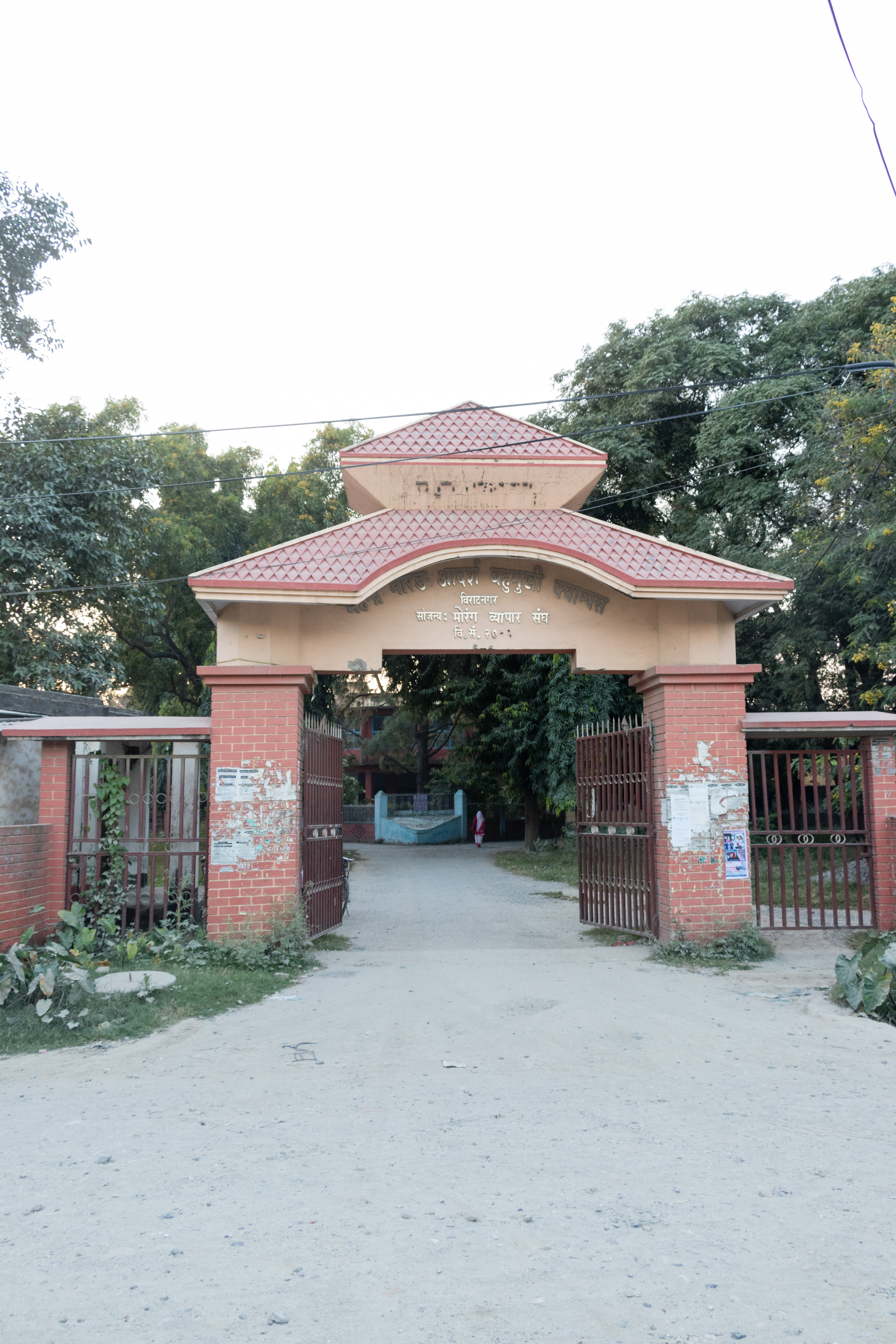
Mahendra Morang Adarsh Multiple Campuus

=== Koshi Province ===
1. Mahendra Ratna Multiple Campus, Illam
2. Mahendra statue, Mahendra Park(Chandragadhi)
3. Mahendra Park, Chandragadhi, (Jhapa)
4. Mahendra Multiple Campus, Dharan
5. Mahendra path, Dharan
6. Shree Mahendra Higher Secondary School, Itahari
7. Mahendranagar Municipality
8. Shree Mahendra Jyoti Secondary School, Chaurikharka, (Solukhumbu)
9. Mahendra Chowk, Pathari-Sanischare Municipality, (Morang)
10. Shree Mahendra Higher Secondary School, Biratnagar
11. Mahendra Chowk, Biratnagar
12. Mahendra Marga, Biratnagar
13. Mahendra Morang Adarsh Multiple Campus
14. Shree Mahendra Higher Secondary School, Kamal Gaun Palika, (Jhapa)
15. Shree Mahendra Secondary School, Sharanamati, (Jhapa)
16. Mahendra Jyoti Higher Secondary School, Garamani, (Jhapa)
17. Shree Mahendra Higher Secondary School, Khandbari, Sankhuwasabha
18. Shree Mahendra Higher Secondary School, Manebhanjyang, Okhaldhunga
19. Shree Mahendra Secondary School, Bharaul, Sunsari
20. Mahendra higher secondary school, Itahara, (Morang)
21. Shree Mahendra secondary school, Dangihat, (Morang)
22. Shree Mahendra Secondary School, Woplukha, (Khotang)
23. Mahendranagar town, Sunsari
24. Shree Mahendra Secondary School, Mahendranagar, Sunsari
25. Mahendra Ratna Higher Secondary School, Birtamode (Jhapa)

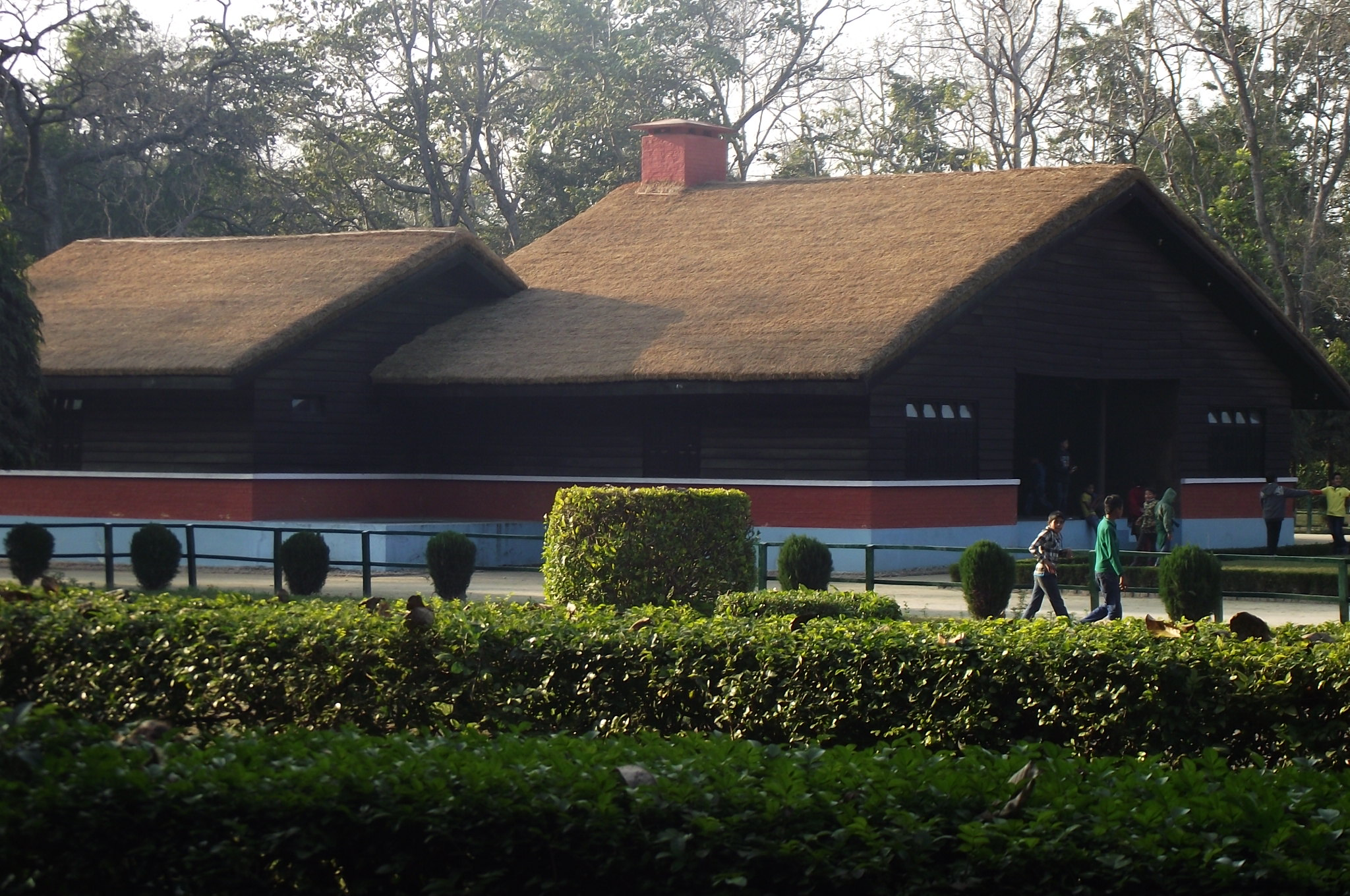
Mahendra Griha at Tikapur Park

=== Sudurpashchim Province ===
1. Mahendranagar Bazaar, Bhimdatta
2. Mahendranagar Airport, Mahendranagar
3. Mahendranagar Town, Mahakali
4. Mahendra statue, Attariya (Kailali)
5. Mahendra Higher Secondary School, Darchula
6. Mahendra Griha, Tikapur Park
7. Mahendra Statue Park, Bhimdatta
8. Mahendra Higher Secondary School, Bhimdatta
9. Mahendra Secondary School, Sanfebagar, Achham
10. Mahendra Secondary School, Amargadhi, Dadeldhura
11. Mahendra Higher Secondary School, Dahabagar (Bajhang)

=== Others ===
1. Mahendra Highway
2. Mahendra Mala Book
3. Mahendra Police Club
4. King Mahendra Trust for Nature Conservation
5. Mahendra Mala Manapadvi
6. Mahendra Pragya Puraskar
7. Mahendra Gold Cup
8. Mahendra Bhawan Scout Troop
9. His Majesty King Mahendra Bir Bikram Shaha Deva (an Analytical Biography)
10. King Mahendra Poetic Values and Technique Based on the Kashmiri Pandit Tradition (Book)

== Honors ==
=== British Field Marshal ===
King Mahendra was appointed as a British Field Marshal in 1962.

=== Pakistani Field Marshal ===
King Mahendra was appointed as an honorary Field Marshal of the Pakistan Army by President Ayub Khan on 12 May 1963.

=== King Mahendra and Queen's visit to US ===
King Mahendra and Queen Ratna visited the US in 1960 and 1967. In 1960 they were greeted by President Dwight D. Eisenhower and in 1967 they were greeted by President Lyndon B Johnson and Mrs. Johnson in Washington DC in 1967. The royal couple of Nepal was greeted with the 'guard of honor'.

Other honors were as follows:

=== National Orders ===
- Sovereign of the Order of Nepal Pratap Bhaskara
- Sovereign of the Order of Ojaswi Rajanya
- Sovereign of the Order of Nepal Taradisha
- Sovereign of the Order of Tri Shakti Patta
- Sovereign of the Order of Gorkha Dakshina Bahu
- Mahendra Mala Manapadvi (26 February 1961)
- Commemorative Silver Jubilee Medal of King Tribhuvan (11 December 1936)

=== Foreign Orders ===
- Iran: Commemorative Medal of the 2500th Anniversary of the founding of the Persian Empire, 14 October 1971.
- Japan: Collar of the Order of the Chrysanthemum, 19 April 1960
- Portugal: Grand Cross of the Order of Saint James of the Sword, 13 July 1960
- France: Grand Cross of the Order of Legion of Honour, 24 February 1956
- Belgium: Grand Cross of the Order of Leopold II, 1964
- Germany: Grand Cross Special Class of the Order of Merit of the Federal Republic of Germany, 1964
- Kingdom of Laos: Collar of the Order of the Million Elephants and the White Parasol, 1970
- Netherlands Grand Cross of the Order of the Netherlands Lion, 25 April 1967.
- United Kingdom: Recipient of the Royal Victorian Chain, 26 February 1961
- Philippines: Collar of the Order of Sikatuna, Rank of Raja, 22 April 1971.

=== Scholastic ===
- United States of America: Honorary Doctor of Laws, University of Detroit Mercy, 1960

== Ancestry ==
Ancestors of Mahendra of Nepal

8. Trailokya, Crown Prince of Nepal
4. King Prithvi Bir Bikram Shah Dev of Nepal
9. Lalit Rajeshwori Rajya Lakshmi Devi
2. King Tribhuvan Bir Bikram Shah Dev of Nepal
5. Divyeshwari Rajya Lakshmi Devi
1. King Mahendra Bir Bikram Shah Dev
6. Arjan Singh Sahib, Raja of Chhatara, Barhgaon and Oudh
3. Kanti Rajya Lakshmi Devi
7. Krishnavati Devi Sahiba

== Regnal titles ==
Regnal titles
| Preceded by Tribhuvan Bir Bikram Shah | Crown Prince of Nepal; 1920–1950 | Succeeded by Gyanendra Bir Bikram Shah |
| Preceded by Gyanendra Bir Bikram Shah | Crown Prince of Nepal; 1951–1955 | Succeeded by Birendra Bir Bikram Shah |
| Preceded by Tribhuvan Bir Bikram Shah | King of Nepal; 1955–1972 | Succeeded by Birendra Bir Bikram Shah |
