= Dal Singh Thapa =

Nepali politician

Dal Singh Thapa (Nepali: दलसिंह थापा) was a leader of the Nepali Congress. He was involved in the 1961 bombing against King Mahendra, and was sentenced to death; this sentence was later commuted to life imprisonment. His friend Durgananda Jha, who was caught with him in the bombing, was hanged. After his father and mother were killed in their home, reportedly by member of the Armed Police Force, he stayed with Subarna Shamsher Rana and got into politics. He also was an advisor of the late Bishweshwar Prasad Koirala and is known for his fight for democracy, spending 21 years in prison.
