= List of official overseas trips made by Mahendra of Nepal to the United States =

State visit of king of Nepal to the USA

King Mahendra of Nepal had a state visit to the United States of America in 1960 and 1967. In the first visit, he went to Washington D.C., Honolulu, New York City, Knoxville, Salem and Eugene, San Francisco, Los Angeles, Albuquerque, Dallas, Miami, and Detroit. In the second visit, he went to Williamsburg, Cape Kennedy, New York City and a hunting trip in Alaska.

== First visit ==
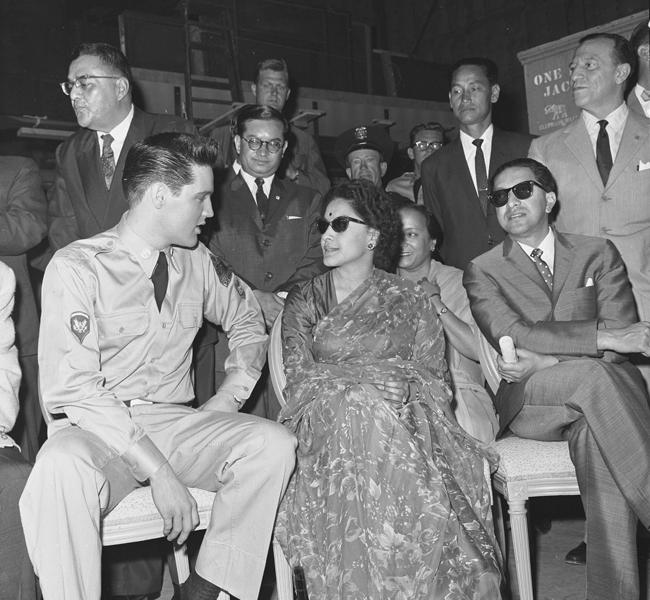
Elvis Presley entertains King Mahendra and Queen Ratna of Nepal on a movie set (11 May 1960)

The first state visit to the USA was made in 27–30 April 1960. King Mahendra was accompanied by the Queen Ratna. They were received by President Dwight D. Eisenhower.

=== Background ===
In June 1958, King Mahendra agreed to accept Soviet economic aid and asked to sign an agreement for assistance and technicians. The visit to USA would be a gesture to resist the aid. The king had also mentioned a visit to USA to the US officials. Based on the request from the state secretary, an official invitation was extended for a state visit.

=== Activities ===
Between 27 and 30 April 1960, Mahendra was in Washington. He addressed the joint session of the U.S. Congress in April 28. In the meeting between the President and the King, they discussed about lasting peace and international justice. And both agreed to strengthen the bilateral relationship.

After Washington, a twelve-day coast-to-coast tour of the United States started. They travelled to Honolulu in Hawaii. He went to New York City, and visited Disneyland where he was hosted by Walt Disney. Later, he visited Knoxville in Tennessee, Salem and Eugene in Oregon, San Francisco, Los Angeles, Albuquerque in New Mexico, Dallas in Texas, Miami, and Detroit in Michigan.

While returning from America, he also visited Mexico (on 16–18 May 1960) and Canada (on 25–28 May 1960).

== Second visit ==
The second visit was made in 1–3 November 1967. The royal couple was greeted by the President Lyndon B Johnson and Mrs. Johnson in Washington DC in 1967. The royal couple of Nepal was greeted with the 'guard of honor'. The king and the president discussed about the foreign affairs and agreed to support the efforts of the United Nations. After the state visit, the king went to Williamsburg, Cape Kennedy, and New York City. He also went for a hunting trip in Alaska.
