= Rajesh Kumar Singh =

Rajesh Kumar Singh is an Indian male name and may refer to:

- Rajesh Kumar Singh (Bihar politician, born 1974)
- Rajesh Kumar Singh (Bihar politician, born 1972)
- Rajesh Kumar Singh (Uttar Pradesh politician)
- Rajesh Kumar Singh (civil servant), 40th defense secretary of India
- Rajesh Singh Kushwaha, Bihar politician

== See also ==
- Rajesh Kumar (disambiguation)
- Rajesh Singh (disambiguation)
