= Diyalo Bangala =

- दियालो बंगला
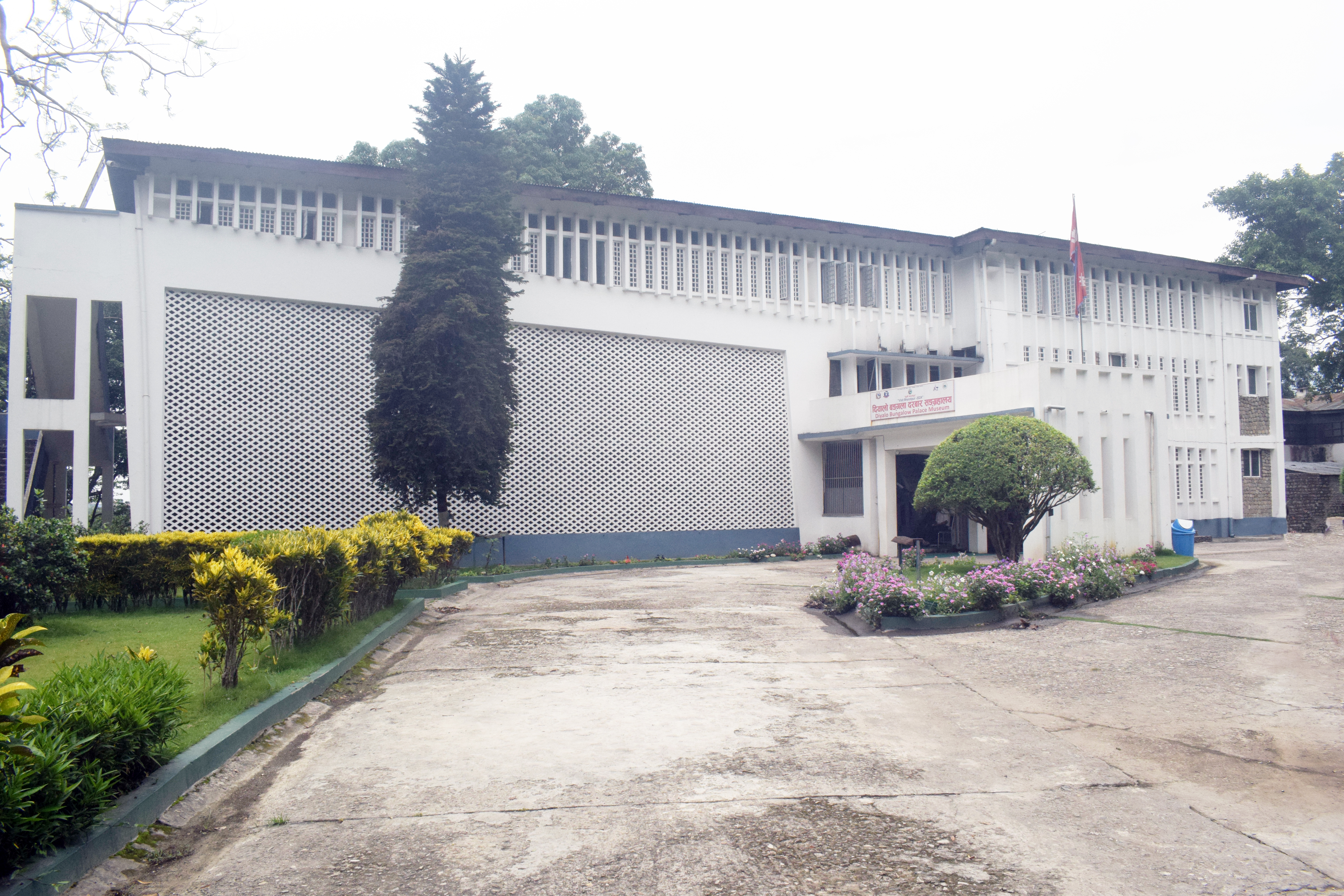

General information
- Town or city: Bharatpur
- Country: Nepal
- Coordinates: 27.710101008211744°N 84.43632818392821°E
- Completed: 1960s
- Owner: The Nepal Trust

Diyalo Bangala (Nepali: दियालो बंगला) is a former palace used by the Nepalese royal family.

It is located in Bharatpur, Nepal, near the Madan Ashrit Highway. Diyalo Bangala was built in the 1960s by King Mahendra. King Mahendra died at this palace on 31 January 1972.
