= Rajesh Singh =

Rajesh Singh may refer to:

- Rajesh Singh (politician) (born 1964), Fijian politician
- Rajesh Singh (cricketer, born 1976), Indian cricketer
- Rajesh Singh (cricketer, born 1993), Indian cricketer
- Rajesh Nandini Singh (1957–2016), Member of the Lok Sabha, the lower house of the Parliament of India (2009–2014)
- Rajesh Pratap Singh (born 1969), Indian fashion designer.
- Rajesh Singh Adhikari MVC (1970-1999), Indian Army officer who died during the Kargil War

== See also ==
- Rajesh Kumar Singh (disambiguation)
