= Rajesh Kumar Mishra =

Rajesh Kumar Mishra may refer to:

- Rajesh Kumar Mishra (born 1950), an Indian National Congress politician from Varanasi, Uttar Pradesh, India
- Rajesh Kumar Mishra (born 1967), a Bharatiya Janata Party politician from Bareilly district, Uttar Pradesh, India
- Rajesh Kumar Mishra (Bihar politician), 2020 Bihar Legislative Assembly candidate in the Sikti Assembly constituency

== See also ==
- Rajesh Kumar (disambiguation)
