= Rajesh Kumar =

Rajesh Kumar is an Indian male name may refer to:

- Rajesh Kumar (actor)
- Rajesh Kumar (air marshal), officer in the Indian Air Force
- Rajesh Kumar (soldier)
- Rajesh Kumar Agrawal, judge on the Supreme Court of India
- Rajesh Kumar Manjhi, politician
- Rajesh Kumar (Madhya Pradesh politician)
- Rajesh Kumar Grover, oncologist
- Rajesh Kumar (police officer), commissioner of police, Kolkata
- Rajesh Kumar (wrestler) (born 1969), Indian Olympic wrestler
- Rajesh Kumar (writer), author of crime fiction
- Rajesh Kumar Bind (born 1994), Indian javelin thrower
- Rajesh Kumar (born 1969), Indian politician from Bihar

== See also ==
- Raj Kumar (disambiguation)
- Rajesh Kumar Mishra (disambiguation)
- Rajesh Kumar Singh (disambiguation)
