= Rajakumaran =

Rajakumaran may refer to:

- Rajakumaran (film), a 1994 Indian Tamil-language film starring Prabhu
- Rajakumaran (director), Indian film director in Tamil cinema

== See also ==
- Rajkumar (disambiguation)
- Kumara Raja (disambiguation)
