= Kumara Raja =

Kumara Raja may refer to these Indian films:

- Kumara Raja (1961 film), a Tamil-language film by G. K. Ramu
- Kumara Raja (1978 film), a Telugu-language film by P. Sambasiva Rao

== See also ==
- Rajkumar (disambiguation)
- Rajakumaran (disambiguation)
- Rigdzin Kumaradza or Kumararaja (1266–1343), a Tibetan Buddhist scholar
