= Dhuskun =

Village in Bagmati Zone, Nepal

Dhuskun धुस्कुन
- Village development committee
- Location in Nepal
- Coordinates: 27.77°N 85.91°E
- Country: Nepal
- Zone: Bagmati Zone
- District: Sindhupalchok District

Population (1991)
  - Total: 3,116
  - Religions: Hindu
- Time zone: UTC+5:45 (Nepal Time)

Dhuskun is a village in Sindhupalchok District in the Bagmati Zone of central Nepal. At the time of the 1991 Nepal census, it had a population of 3116 and had 665 houses in the village.
