= Rajkumar =

Rajkumar or Raj Kumar may refer to:

== Title ==
- non-ruling princely title for a son (sometimes more kin) of a Raja or equivalent royal prince in Southern Asia. Equivalent to royal son, title borne by the sons of a Raja and by the sons of a Nepalese King by a lesser wife or concubine.

== People ==
- Jenifer Rajkumar (born 1980), New York Politician and Indian-American Politician
- Raaj Kumar (1926–1996), Indian actor in Hindi films
- Dr. Rajkumar (1929–2006), Indian actor in Kannada films
- Rajkumar (Tamil actor), Indian actor in Tamil films
- Raj Kumar (athlete) (born 1962), Indian athlete
- Raj Kumar (badminton) (born 1986), Indian badminton player
- Raj Kumar Shukla (1875–?), Indian indigo cultivator
- Rajkumar Hirani (born 1962), Indian producer and director
- Rajkumar Kohli (born 1930), Indian producer and director
- Rajkummar Rao (born 1984) also known as Raj Kumar, Hindi film actor
- Rajkumar Santoshi, Indian producer and director
- Rajkumar Sethupathi (born 1954), Indian film actor in Malayalam and Tamil movies in the 1980s
- Raj Kumar (professor) (born 1959), Indian professor of neurosurgery
- Rajkumar (politician), Indian politician
- Rajkumar Pori, Indian politician from Uttarakhand
- Raj Kumar, founder of development news organization Devex

== Films ==
- Rajkumar (1964 film), a Bollywood film starring Shammi Kapoor and Sadhana
- Rajkumar (1996 film), a Bollywood film starring Anil Kapoor and Madhuri Dixit
- Rajkumar (2008 film), an Indian Bengali-language film starring Prosenjit Chatterjee and Anu Chowdhury
- Rajkumar (2024 film), a Bangladeshi film starring Shakib Khan and Courtney Coffey

=== Others ===
- R... Rajkumar, a 2013 Bollywood film starring Shahid Kapoor and Sonakshi Sinha
- Raajakumara, a 2017 Indian Kannada-language film starring Puneeth Rajkumar and Priya Anand

== See also ==
- Rajakumaran (disambiguation)
- Rajkumari (disambiguation), the female equivalent of Rajkumar
- Kumara Raja (disambiguation)
- Maharajkumar, equivalent title for a Maharaja's royal crown prince in India
- Rajesh Kumar (disambiguation)
- Yuvaraja, Indian title for a crown prince
