= Durgananda Jha =

Nepalese democratic fighter

- Born: Jatahi, Janakpur
- Known for: Attempting to assassinate King Mahendra of Nepal

Durgananda Jha (Nepali: दुर्गानन्द झा) was a Nepalese democratic fighter who attempted to assassinate King Mahendra of Nepal in January 1962 (9 Magh 2018 BS) in Janakpur in southeastern Nepal. Durga was captured after he threw a bomb on a motor-vehicle carrying the king. He managed to throw the bomb amid strict security and presence of thousands of army and police at the Janaki Temple premises in Janakpur during the king's visit to the eastern Terai. He was hanged in 2020 BS Magh 15 (February 1964) at Central Jail, Kathmandu. He was born at Jatahi, Janakpur. Jha was a member of Nepali Congress. At the time of execution he was 23 years old.

He is also considered as the first republican martyr of Nepal. Jha threw a bomb saying King Mahendra had scuttled democracy by dissolving the popularly elected parliament and imposing a direct rule. Jha soon went into exile in India, but did not think it right to be in exile when 59 people were arrested and beaten up in the name of the bomb incident while he was preparing for various movements, and therefore, returned to Nepal. He was detained at Parbaha Railway Station as soon as he returned and put in Central Jail in Sundhara, Kathmandu.

Sympathy to then 21 years old Durganand Jha was expressed quietly, only to the teenage wife. Today Durgananda Jha is hailed as one of the greatest martyrs in southern Nepal. Legend has it that King himself told Jha that he would spare his life for an apology to which Durganand replied that the king was the one who should apologize for all the lives that had been lost in the quest for democracy, which he hijacked.

According to Aravind Thakur, arrested along with him, Jha, as he was prepared for death penalty, had said, "Do not worry, no one can stop republic now".

He is held as a martyr by the democratic parties, which never went mainstream because monarchy retained a power position in Nepal. Monarchs discouraged acts of rebellion against them.

== Contemporary reactions ==
In his posthumously published memoir, Jail Journal, the first democratically elected Prime Minister of Nepal, B.P. Koirala, recorded his reflections on Jha's execution while he was himself imprisoned at Sundarijal Jail. Upon hearing unconfirmed reports of the execution on 31 January 1964, Koirala noted his extreme agitation, writing that he struggled to believe the King would permit such a "horror". On 19 October, after the news was confirmed by newspapers, Koirala described himself as "shaken as never before," addressing Jha directly in his diary with the promise that his "martyrdom will not go in vain".

== Controversies ==
A statue of Durganand Jha was proposed to replace King Mahendra in 1993, but his majesty's government of Nepal within King Mahendra's son, King Birendra disapproved the proposal. The democratic party which won the general election after the fall of Panchayat dictatorship sustained Kings position on not paying proper respect to Jha's sacrifice. This disregard has hurt the local sentiment, which they say hails in the government's pro-hill ethnic policies. Similar example is seen in erecting a statue of Bhanubhakta (a poet who translated Ramayan in Nepali) at Bhanu Chowk in Janakpur instead of a multitude of Maithili laureates.

== Influences ==
Durgananda Jha was influenced by martyr Bhagat Singh of India.

== Recent development ==
Widow of Durgananda Jha has been nominated as a member of constituent assembly by Madhesh-based party (Durgananda Jha was a member of Nepali Congress).

== Awards ==
- Maha Ujwaol Rastradeep awards from the President of Nepal on 2021
