= Chhiwang =

Village development committee in Karnali Province, Nepal

Chhiwang छिवाङ
- Village development committee
- Location in Nepal
- Coordinates: 28.62°N 82.40°E
- Country: Nepal
- Province: Karnali Province
- District: Western Rukum District

Population (2011)
  - Total: 5,725
- Time zone: UTC+5:45 (Nepal Time)
- Area code: +977-88
- Website: www.ddcrukum.gov.np

Chhiwang is a village development committee in Western Rukum District in Karnali Province of western Nepal. At the time of the 1991 Nepal census it had a population of 4,252 people living in 805 individual households.
