= Trade unions in Nepal =

Global Rights Index
- 3 Regular violations of rights

International Labour Organization
- Nepal is a member of the ILO

Convention ratification
- Right to Organise: 11 November 1991

Trade unions in Nepal have a history that dates back to the immediate post-war period and were fundamental to the success of the 2006 Nepalese revolution. The first union, the All Nepal Trade Union Congress (ANTUC), was founded in 1946 and membership of unions grew after the 1950–1951 revolution. Unions were banned after the 1960 coup d'état but returned following the 1990 revolution and the passing of government acts in 1992 that unions were formally able to operate. Unions saw substantial growth, particularly in period up to 2006. At the time, the country had the fastest growing union membership in the world at a time when many other countries saw membership decline. Currently, unions are largely affiliated with political parties. Amongst the largest are the All Nepal Trade Union Federation (ANTUF), which is affiliated with the Nepal Communist Party (NCP), and the Nepal Trade Union Congress (NTUC), which is affiliated with Nepali Congress. In 2026, attempts were made to ban trade unions affiliated with political parties.

== History ==
Trade union activity in Nepal started in the post-war period with the first union, the All Nepal Trade Union Congress (ANTUC), founded in 1946, followed by the Biratnagar Workers Union (BWU), which instigated the Biratnagar Jute Mill Strike, the following year. Initially, the impact of the unions was limited but the introduction of a new constitution following the 1950–1951 revolution provided an official space for unionization and union activities, which led to the foundation of a large number of unions across the country.

Activity was curtailed following the 1960 coup d'état and union activity was banned. A government-created organisation, the Nepal Labor Organisation, was the only officially permitted entity able to carry out trade union-like activity. It was not until 1990 revolution and the Labour Act (1992) and Trade Union Act (1992) that trade unions once again gained formal recognition. In the period immediately following, they were generally weakened and achieved few gains for the workforce. Despite the country ratifying the International Labour Organization convention 98, the Right to Organise and Collective Bargaining Convention, 1949, on 11 November 1991, the country's tourism industry was held to be still at risk of serious violations in its ability to provide free and fair collective bargaining through unions ten years later.

During the period up to 2006, trade union membership across the country grew dramatically, in number, density and voice. A structure of three tiers of unions developed, with enterprise-trade unions operating at a company level, trade union associations representing roles or sectors and trade union federations acting at the national level. Support from workers and the unions were fundamental to the 2006 Nepalese revolution. Membership continued to grow, with ANTUC remaining the largest union by number of members. Nepal saw the largest percentage growth in union members in the world, bucking a global trend of declining membership for many unions in other countries.

The strength of the informal economy and the emergence of new technologies has meant that more recently workers have sought mechanisms for collective action outside traditional union structures. This is creating tension. Particularly there has been a call to ban unions aligned with political parties. In 2026, the country attempted to restrict unions again.

== Structure ==
Nepalese trade unions are members of larger trade union federations that are often strongly affiliated with political parties. Federations of unions include:

- All Nepal Trade Union Federation (ANTUF)— affiliated with the Nepal Communist Party (NCP), the federation has over 415,000 members.
- Confederation of Nepalese Teachers — a coalition of 16 unions.
- General Federation of Nepalese Trade Unions (GEFONT) — affiliated with the NCP.
- Independent Democratic Confederation of Nepalese Trade Union (INDECONT) — affiliated with the Rastriya Prajatantra Party Nepal.
- Nepal Trade Union Congress (NTUC) —the successor to ANTUC, affiliated with Nepali Congress. Having merged with the Democratic Confederation of Nepalese Trade Unions (DECONT) in 2008, has more than 350,000 members.
