= Prince Hridayendra of Nepal =

Former Prince of Nepal

Hridayendra Shah
- Shree Panch Nava Yuvaraj
- Born: 30 July 2002 (age 24); Narayanhiti Palace, Nepal
Names
- Hridayendra Bir Bikram Shah Dev
- Dynasty: Shah Dynasty
- Father: Paras Shah
- Mother: Himani Shah
- Religion: Hinduism
- Education: Suffolk University

Hridayendra Bir Bikram Shah Dev (Nepali: हृदयेन्द्र शाह) (born; 30 July 2002) is a member of the former Nepalese royal family. Until the monarchy was abolished on 28 May 2008, he was the second in line to the Nepalese throne. During that time, he was known by the title of Nava Yuvaraj (Nepali: नवयुवराज navayuvarāj), generally translated as Junior Crown Prince.

== Nava Yuvaraj ==
Prince Hridayendra was born at 12:49 p.m. on 30 July 2002 at the Narayanhiti Royal Palace in Kathmandu to Crown Prince Paras Bir Bikram Shah Dev and Crown Princess Himani Rajya Lakshmi Devi Shah. His paternal grandparents are former King Gyanendra Bir Bikram Shah Dev and former Queen Komal Rajya Lakshmi Devi Shah, a member of the Rana dynasty. Through his mother, he is descended from the former Indian princely family of Sikar, belonging to the Shekhawat clan. His birth, approximately fourteen months after the 2001 Nepalese royal massacre, established a male successor to his father under Nepal's traditional rules of royal succession.

The birth was marked by official celebrations across Nepal. The government declared 31 July 2002 a public holiday and encouraged citizens to illuminate their homes with candles. Contemporary reporting also described a 21-gun salute by the Royal Nepalese Army, decorative lighting of public buildings and temples, and the placement of a congratulatory register outside the Narayanhiti Palace for members of the public to sign. Newspapers carried advertisements congratulating the Crown Prince and Crown Princess on the birth of their son. Political commentator Narayan Wagle described the birth as bringing relief to the royal household by resolving uncertainty over the succession. The celebrations occurred amid continued public debate over the monarchy's future following the 2001 massacre.

Following Hindu custom, Hridayendra was formally named Hridayendra Bir Bikram Shah Dev in a ceremony at the Narayanhiti Royal Palace on 9 August 2002, eleven days after his birth. The ceremony was attended by senior members of the royal family. His name has been translated as "King of Hearts."

On 9 January 2003, Hridayendra underwent his traditional Annaprasan, or rice-feeding ceremony, at the Narayanhiti Royal Palace. In accordance with Hindu tradition, he was fed rice by his mother and other members of the royal family. Prime Minister Lokendra Bahadur Chand participated in the ceremony, offering the prince a gold coin as part of the traditional observances. A public holiday was declared for the occasion, and thousands of people lined the streets of Kathmandu to witness Hridayendra's first public appearance. Following the palace ceremony, the infant prince was carried in a horse-drawn carriage in a procession through the old city to religious sites near Hanuman Dhoka, including the Maru Ganesh Temple. Chand acted as the prince's ceremonial guardian, carrying him during visits to the temples. A Royal Nepalese Army band accompanied the procession, while spectators threw flowers and set off firecrackers along the approximately two-mile route.

During his early childhood, Hridayendra occasionally accompanied his father, Crown Prince Paras, to football matches and appeared alongside his grandparents at royal ceremonies. As proposals to place him on the throne gained attention in 2007, he became the subject of increasing media coverage. On 19 June, the newspaper Naya Patrika published a profile of Hridayendra describing his upbringing and education at Rupy's International School in Tahachal, where he was then a first-grade student. The Times of India described the publication of the profile as a departure from earlier conventions under which the Nepalese press generally refrained from reporting extensively on the private lives of royal children.

== Place in line of succession ==
In August 2006, amid political changes following the restoration of Parliament, the Nepalese cabinet approved proposed legislation to end the exclusion of women from the royal succession. Under the proposal, the monarch's eldest child would become eligible to inherit regardless of gender. Contemporary reports indicated that the proposed reform could place Hridayendra's elder sister, Princess Purnika, ahead of him if enacted.

The proposal came during a period of increasing uncertainty over the future of the monarchy. In 2007, Prime Minister Girija Prasad Koirala publicly suggested that King Gyanendra and Crown Prince Paras should step aside in favor of the young Hridayendra, who would serve as a ceremonial monarch.

The proposal was discussed as a possible compromise between retaining the monarchy and establishing a republic. However, the Maoists who advocated the abolition of the monarchy, rejected the proposal.

On 24 December 2007, Nepal's political parties agreed to abolish the monarchy following elections to a Constituent Assembly. On 28 May 2008, the newly elected assembly formally abolished the monarchy and declared Nepal a federal democratic republic.

== Education ==
Following the abolition of the monarchy in May 2008, Hridayendra, his mother, and his sisters departed Nepal for Singapore on 17 July 2008 to join Crown Prince Paras, who had traveled there earlier to arrange for the family's relocation and education. The family subsequently returned to Nepal, where Hridayendra continued his schooling. He attended Lincoln School, from which he graduated in May 2021. His graduation ceremony was conducted virtually because of restrictions associated with the COVID-19 pandemic.

== Public life after monarchy ==
In July 2013, Hridayendra accompanied his grandparents, former King Gyanendra and Queen Komal, and his mother, Himani Shah, on a visit to Dhangadhi in western Nepal in connection with a flood relief initiative organized through the Himani Trust, a Nepalese charitable organization chaired by the former Crown Princess. The family traveled to the region following severe flooding in Darchula and surrounding districts, with plans to distribute assistance to affected communities. The visit attracted considerable public attention.

On 30 March 2017, Hridayendra underwent his Bratabandha (also known as Upanayana), a traditional Hindu sacred-thread initiation ceremony, at Nirmal Niwas, the former royal family's residence in Kathmandu. Following the ceremony, he visited the Ashok Binayak Temple in Basantapur, where he performed religious rituals. On 6 April, his grandfather, former King Gyanendra, hosted a reception at the Soaltee Hotel in Kathmandu to celebrate the occasion. The reception was attended by approximately 3,000 guests, including Nepal's sitting president, Bidya Devi Bhandari, government ministers, political leaders, and public figures.

On 5 April 2018, Hridayendra accompanied his grandfather, former King Gyanendra, on a religious visit to Dharan in eastern Nepal. The two visited the Dantakali Temple, Budha Subba Temple, and Pindeshwor Baba Dham, where they offered prayers. Their visit attracted gatherings of local residents, including supporters of the former monarchy who welcomed the former king and his grandson.

In April 2025, Hridayendra became the subject of public controversy following comments made by Nepalese actress Surakshya Panta during a television interview. Asked about Hridayendra's future, Panta suggested that he consider a career in the film industry, citing his appearance and popularity among younger audiences. When the interviewer raised the possibility of restoring the monarchy, Panta responded that Nepal had rejected the monarchical system and that she did not envision Hridayendra as a king. Her remarks prompted criticism and online harassment. Other public figures defended Panta's right to express her opinions.

On 30 April 2025, Prime Minister K. P. Sharma Oli publicly commented on the controversy, defending Panta's freedom of expression and criticizing the backlash against her. Oli questioned why Panta should be insulted for suggesting that Hridayendra pursue acting and offered similar advice himself, stating, "If he dreams of becoming king, his life will pass in dreams." On 1 May, Nepalese media reported that Hridayendra had responded through Instagram, writing, "We all have the right to express our opinions openly, and we must respect each other's views." He also urged the public to "spread kindness" and support one another rather than engage in personal attacks.

On 24 May 2025, Hridayendra accompanied his grandparents, former King Gyanendra and Queen Komal, on a visit to the Chaturvyuh Narayan Temple within the Narayanhiti Palace complex. During the visit, the family also met Queen Mother Ratna, widow of Hridayendra's great-grandfather King Mahendra, at Mahendra Manzil, where she continued to reside.

On 2 June 2025, Hridayendra accompanied his mother, Himani Shah, to a memorial lamp-lighting ceremony at the Ganesh Temple in Kamaladi commemorating the 24th anniversary of the 2001 Nepalese royal massacre. The ceremony, organized by the Himani Trust, honored King Birendra, Queen Aishwarya, and other members of the royal family killed in the massacre. A large crowd greeted Hridayendra and his mother as they entered the temple, with supporters chanting slogans in favor of the former monarchy. The event was disrupted when members of the Young Communist League, the youth wing of the CPN (Maoist Centre), emerged from a nearby political gathering and confronted royalist supporters. Stone-throwing and pushing occurred between the two groups, prompting police intervention. The ceremony had originally been planned for the Narayanhiti Palace complex but was relocated to Kamaladi after authorities denied permission to hold it there.

Later that month, Hridayendra accompanied his mother on a visit to Jumla District in Karnali Province as part of activities associated with the Himani Trust. On 8 June, they participated in the groundbreaking ceremony for a maternity and birthing center in Manisanghu, Ward No. 1 of Guthichaur Rural Municipality. The facility, estimated to cost NPR 15 million, was intended to improve maternal and newborn healthcare services for nine settlements in the surrounding area. During the same visit, Hridayendra and Himani inaugurated an irrigation reservoir in Ward No. 7 of Hima Rural Municipality, designed to support agricultural production.

On 30 July 2025, his 23rd birthday, Hridayendra released a travel vlog titled My Trip to Jumla, documenting his visit to the district. The approximately 15-minute video featured conversations with local residents, students, and entrepreneurs about education, economic opportunities, and rural development. During the video, he expressed optimism about Nepal's development, discussed his studies in the United States, and indicated his intention to return to Nepal after completing his undergraduate education. The video attracted considerable attention on Nepalese social media, with more than 1.1 million views on YouTube.

The video's popularity also prompted debate about Hridayendra's public profile and the possibility of restoring Nepal's monarchy. On 15 August, The Kathmandu Post published an opinion article titled Authoritarianism with a new face, which characterized the vlog as a calculated public relations effort to present Hridayendra as a youthful alternative to Nepal's political establishment and warned against using his popularity to advance the restoration of the monarchy. On 21 August, the newspaper published a contrasting column titled The 'ghost' in the 'republic', which argued that Hridayendra's popularity reflected public dissatisfaction with Nepal's political leadership and that Hridayendra should be judged on his own merits rather than solely on his family's political history.

On 2 August 2025, Hridayendra joined his mother, grandfather, and other members of the former royal family at the Himani Trust's Brain Drain to Brain Gain event, held in collaboration with the International Club in Sanepa, Lalitpur. The program sought to encourage Nepalese living abroad to return and contribute to the country's economic development through entrepreneurship, skills development, and investment.

On 2 June 2026, Hridayendra again participated in commemorations of the Nepalese royal massacre, marking its 25th anniversary. Accompanied by his sisters, Purnika and Kritika, and other members of the former royal family, he attended a memorial ceremony at the Chaturvyuh Narayan Temple within the Narayanhiti Palace complex in Kathmandu. Participants lit traditional oil lamps and offered prayers before portraits of King Birendra, Queen Aishwarya, and other relatives killed in the massacre.

Prince Hridayendra of Nepal Shah dynasty Born: 30 July 2002
Nepalese royalty
Preceded by Paras, Crown Prince of Nepal	Line of succession to the Nepalese Throne; 2nd position	Princess Purnika of Nepal
