= Paras Bir Bikram Shah =

Former Crown Prince of Nepal

- Shri Panch Yubarajadiraja
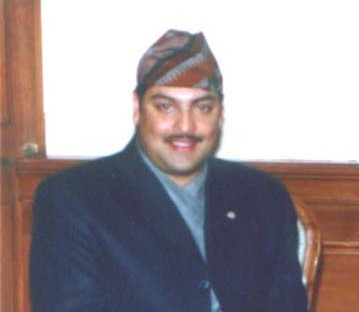
- Paras in 2004
- Born: 30 December 1971 (age 54); Kathmandu, Nepal
- Spouse: Himani Rajya Lakshmi Devi (m. 2000)
- Issue: Princess Purnika; Prince Hridayendra; Princess Kritika
Regnal name
- Nepali: श्री ५ युवराजादिराज पारस वीर विक्रम शाह; Shri Panch Yubarajadiraja Paras Bir Bikram Shah
- Dynasty: Shah
- Father: Gyanendra
- Mother: Komal
- Religion: Hinduism

Paras Bir Bikram Shah (Nepali: पारस वीर विक्रम शाह; born 30 December 1971) is the former and last crown prince of the Kingdom of Nepal. He was declared the heir apparent to the throne on 26 October 2001 following the royal massacre and remained crown prince until 28 May 2008, when the monarchy was abolished and the democratic republic was proclaimed.

== Education ==
Paras is the only son of the deposed King Gyanendra and Queen Komal of Nepal. He has one sister, Prerana. He received his early education at St. Joseph's School in Darjeeling, India; Budhanilkantha School, Kathmandu; and Laboratory School, Kathmandu. He later attended Luther College in Iowa, and the Schiller International University in the United Kingdom studying for an undergraduate degree in Business Administration. However, he did not complete his undergraduate education.

== Family ==
Paras married Himani Rajya Lakshmi Devi Shah a member of the Princely family of Sikar on 25 January 2000. They have three children: Purnika Rajya Lakshmi Devi Shah (b. 12 December 2000), Hridayendra Bir Bikram Shah Dev (b. 30 July 2002) and Kritika Rajya Lakshmi Devi Shah (b. 16 October 2004).

== Crown Prince (2001–2007) ==
On 1 June 2001, Paras was at the Royal Palace during the royal massacre, which resulted in the deaths of King Birendra and most of the Royal Family, including Crown Prince Dipendra. Paras sustained injuries in the massacre and, according to eyewitness accounts, saved the lives of at least three royals, including two children, by pulling a sofa over them. Gyanendra, who had held the title of King of Nepal briefly during the 1950s, was again crowned king. Paras, as King Gyanendra's only son, became Crown Prince of Nepal on 26 October 2001.

Styles of Paras Shah
- Reference style: His Royal Highness
- Spoken style: Your Royal Highness

In July 2007, the Nepalese Prime Minister Girija Prasad Koirala called for then-King Gyanendra to abdicate the throne and for Paras to renounce his dynastic rights in favour of his son, Prince Hridayendra.

== Conservation trust controversy ==
In 2008, the National Trust for Nature Conservation, published a report alleging that the Royal Family had misused funds belonging to the charity. The trust was formerly run by Crown Prince Paras, with King Gyanendra as its patron. The committee alleged that the Royal Family had spent large amounts of trust funds on themselves over several years to finance trips abroad, lavish parties, Queen Komal's health check-ups in the United Kingdom. One trip highlighted in the report was Crown Prince Paras' visit to Austria to donate a pair of Indian Rhinoceros, an endangered species in Nepal, to a zoo. As the charity is now run by Maoists, the objectivity of the findings has been questioned.

== Brushes with the law ==
In August 2000, Paras was alleged to have run over and killed Praveen Gurung, a popular singer. A police investigation ensued, but Paras was not charged. An army officer later claimed responsibility for the incident.

Paras was reported to have fired a pistol into the air at a Chitwan hotel on 11 December 2010 under the influence of alcohol. He reportedly opened fire at Rubel Chaudhary, alleging that his family members had conspired to abolish Nepal's monarchy and also attempted to defame Nepal and Nepalis during his confrontations with the prince. He was arrested 3 days later for a court trial to be initiated on 19 December.

In July 2014, Paras was arrested on drugs charges in Thailand for a second time with the possibility of facing five years in prison.

Local newspapers had reported that the police arrested Paras with a green plastic tube used for drugs, and found two similar plastic tubes from a BMW vehicle he was riding.

On 30 July 2021, Paras Shah was again in the limelight after mistreating a police officer on duty. He had misbehaved at Narayan Gopal Chowk in Maharajgunj on Friday evening when the traffic police tried to question him. Nepal police explained he was drunk and not wearing a helmet. Later he apologized.

== Health ==
On 6 September 2007, Paras was rushed to the Military Hospital after he complained of chest pain. Later, at around 11:30 am, he was transferred to the Norvic International Hospital in Kathmandu. He was operated on for about 50 minutes, apparently to treat a "mild heart attack". Doctors performed a balloon angioplasty on him to clear a blocked artery.

On 19 February 2013, Paras was admitted to Samitivej Hospital in Bangkok, Thailand after he suffered a second heart attack. After being hospitalized for more than two weeks, Paras regained consciousness on 2 March. In 2015, he had an implantable cardioverter-defribillator placed in his heart due to arrhythmia.

On 28 January 2019 he suffered a third heart attack and was admitted to Norvic International Hospital.

In September 2023, after suffering a fourth heart attack, he was admitted at HAMS Hospital in Mandikhatar.

In March 2025, Crown Prince Paras suffered a fifth heart attack and was admitted to Norvic International Hospital in Thapathali, Kathmandu, and underwent angioplasty surgery. His condition was defined as "stable".

Paras Bir Bikram Shah Shah dynasty Born: 30 December 1971
Nepalese royalty
Vacant Title last held by Dipendra	Crown Prince of Nepal; 26 October 2001 – 28 May 2008	Succeeded by Monarchy abolished
First in line	Line of succession to the Nepalese Throne; 1st position	Succeeded by Prince Hridayendra of Nepal
