= Ramjee Kunwar =

Nepalese trade unionist and politician

- रामजी कुँवर
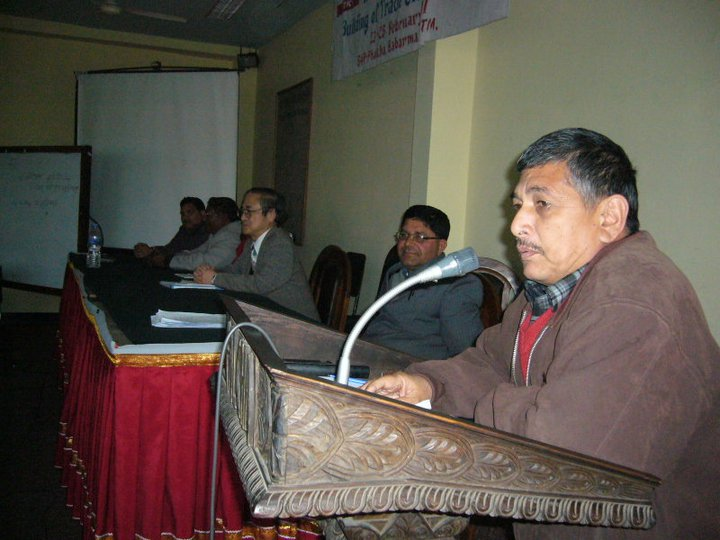
- Kunwar addressing NTUCI and JILAF in 2011

Acting President of NTUCI

Vice president

Secretary

Personal details
- Party: Nepal Trade Union Congress-Independent, Nepali Congress
- Education: Gandhigram Rural University

Ramjee Kunwar (Nepali: रामजी कुँवर) is a Nepal Trade Union Congress-Independent (NTUCI) leader, Senior Vice President of NTUCI and executive member of Nepali Congress Party. He was also the former vice president and secretary of NTUCI and is currently acting president.

NTUCI is a major democratic national center of Nepal, established in 1947. The labor movement in Nepal started on March 4, 1947, in Biratnagar against the hereditary Rana rule for the establishment of democracy and advancement of workers’ rights. In 1948, Girija Prasad Koirala founded the Nepal Mazdoor Congress, later known as the Nepal Trade Union Congress-Independent. NTUCI also actively agitated and protested in the 2006 democracy movement in Nepal against the direct and undemocratic rule of King Gyanendra of Nepal. Many trade union leaders along with Kunwar were put in jail and some fled to India. The ideology of NTUCI was based on democracy, nationalism and socialism. NTUCI is affiliated with the International Trade Union Confederation (ITUC) and the International Labour Organization.

== Career ==
Kunwar attended Gandhigram Rural University, Tamil Nadu, India in 1984. He worked in the health sector for 22 years. He joined the labour movement in 1990.

Kunwar was part of the Nepalese delegation to the 2009 International Labour Conference and met with ILO director general Juan Somavía on efforts to incorporate labour rights in the constitution. He criticized the "no work no pay" provision in the 2010 Industrial Policy 2067 as anti-worker.

Kunwar was a negotiator in discussions between trade unions, the Federation of Nepalese Chambers of Commerce and Industry, and the Confederation of Nepalese Industries on worker wages. An agreement was reached in March 2011 to increase minimum daily wage to रू 226, increase minimum salary to रू 6,100, and establish a Social Security Fund.
