= Independent Workers Union =

Independent Workers Union may refer to:

- Independent Workers' Union of Great Britain
- Independent Workers Union of Ireland
- Nepal Independent Workers Union
