= Queen Komal of Nepal =

Queen of Nepal from 2001 to 2008

Komal Rajya Lakshmi Devi Shah
- Shree Panch Badamaharani
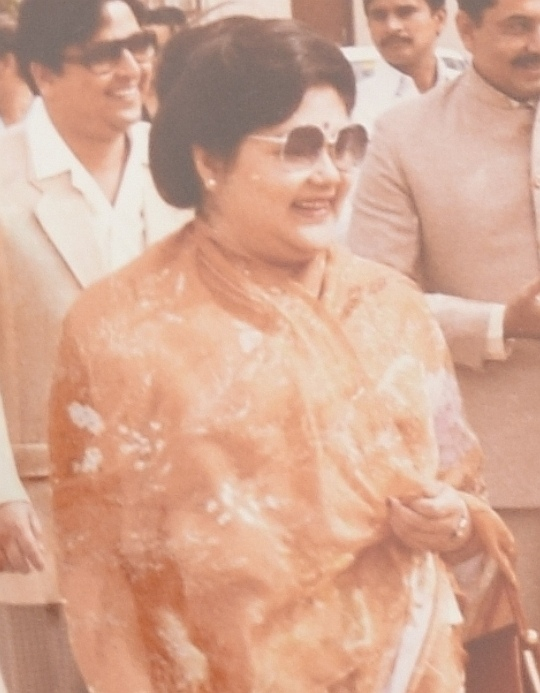
- Queen Komal in Nepal, c. 1985

Queen consort of Nepal
- Tenure: 4 June 2001 – 28 May 2008
- Coronation: 4 June 2001
- Born: Komal Rana; 18 February 1951 (age 75); Bagmati, Kathmandu, Nepal
- Spouse: Gyanendra of Nepal
- Issue: Paras, Crown Prince of Nepal; Princess Prerana
Names
- Komal Rajya Lakshmi Devi Shah
- House: Rana (by birth); Shah (by marriage)
- Father: Kendra Shumsher Jang Bahadur Rana
- Mother: Shree Rajya Lakshmi Devi Shah
- Religion: Hinduism

Komal Rajya Lakshmi Devi Shah (Nepali: कोमल राज्य लक्ष्मी देवी शाह; born 18 February 1951) is a member of the Nepalese royal family who was the last Queen of Nepal as the wife of King Gyanendra of Nepal until the monarchy was abolished on 28 May 2008. She is also known by the name Komal Shah.

== Life ==
Komal was born in Bagmati, Kathmandu into the Rana family, the daughter of Kendra Shumsher Jang Bahadur Rana (1927–1982) and his wife Rajya Lakshmi Devi Shah (1928–2005).

She was educated at St Mary's School, Jawalakhel, St Helen's Convent, Kurseong, India and Kalanidhi Sangeet Mahavidhyalaya, Kathmandu.

Komal's older sister Aishwarya was married to King Birendra of Nepal, the brother of Gyanendra. Aishwarya was killed in the palace massacre on 1 June 2001. Komal sustained bullet injuries as a result of the palace shooting and spent four weeks recovering in hospital.

As a result of the 2001 massacre, Komal's husband Gyanendra succeeded to the throne following the deaths of King Birendra, Crown Prince Dipendra (who had briefly succeeded him), and Prince Nirajan. Komal thus became Queen of Nepal.

Komal's younger sister Prekshya also married into the Shah dynasty marrying Gyanendra and Birendra's brother Prince Dhirendra who was also killed in the palace massacre. They had divorced in 1991. Prekshya was killed in a helicopter crash on 12 November 2001.

Queen Komal married her second cousin Prince Gyanendra of Nepal on 1 May 1970 in Kathmandu. They have two children:

1. Paras Shah (born on 30 December 1971 in Kathmandu).
2. Prerana Shah Singh (born on 20 February 1978 in Kathmandu).

== Abolition of the monarchy ==
The Nepalese Parliament voted on 28 December 2007 as part of a peace deal with former Maoist rebels, 270-3 in favour of abolishing the monarchy.

On 28 May 2008, the monarchy was officially abolished, replaced by a secular federal republic.

== Patronages ==
- Member of the Raj Sabha (1977).
- Patron Association of St Mary's Alumnae Nepal.
- Chairman of the Pashupati Area Development Trust (PADT).
- President of the SOS Children's Villages-Nepal (2001).

== Honours ==
=== National ===
Arms of Komal as dame of the Order of Isabella the Catholic

- Member of Order of Gorkha Right Arm (1975)
- Member of the Order of Rama Mantra Power (1980)
- Member of the Order of Three Divine Powers (1998)
- Member of the Order of Honour (17 October 2001)
- Member of the Order of the Benevolent Ruler (7 April 2004)
- Recipient of the Vishesh Seva Medal (Distinguished Service Medal, 1971)
- Recipient of the King Birendra Investiture Medal (24 February 1975)
- Recipient of the Commemorative Silver Jubilee Medal of King Birendra (31 January 1997)
- Recipient of the Vishista Seva Medal (Distinguished Service Medal, 1999)
- Recipient of the King Gyanendra Investiture Medal (4 June 2001)
- Most Glorious Mahendra Chain

=== Foreign ===
- Thailand: Dame Grand Cordon of the Order of the White Elephant (1995)
- France: Grand Cross of the National Order of Merit (2 May 1983)
- Spain: Dame Grand Cross of the Order of Isabella the Catholic (13 November 1987)

Royal titles
| Preceded by Aishwarya | Queen consort of Nepal; 2001–2008 | Republic declared |
