= Trade unions in Bhutan =

International Labour Organization
- Bhutan is not a member of the ILO

There are no trade unions in Bhutan.

Bhutan is a member state of the United Nations, which makes it eligible to be a member state of the International Labour Organization, but Bhutan government has declined. The economy is primarily subsistence farming, agriculture and informal economy.

Since 2008, freedom of association and assembly are permitted, but there are restrictions, for example those advocating for Nepali speaking refugees are deemed as "harming" security and national unity.

In the 1980, over 100,000 Lhotshampa people were expelled into UNHCR refugee camps in Nepal. While there is no trade union operating in Bhutan, Federation of Bhutanese Trade Unions operates in exile, from Kathmandu.

== See also ==
- Category:Trade unions in Bhutan
- Trade unions in Nepal
