= Himani Shah =

Former Crown Princess of Nepal

Crown Princess Himani
- Crown Princess of Nepal; Rajkumari of Sikar
- Born: 1 October 1976 (age 50); Kathmandu, Nepal
- Spouse: Paras, Crown Prince of Nepal (m. 2000)
- Issue: Princess Purnima Ragjya Laxmi Shah; Prince Hridayendra Bir Bikram Shah; Princess Kritika Rajya Laxmi Shah
Names
- Himani Rajya Lakshmi Devi Shah
- House: Shah dynasty (by marriage); Sikar (by birth)
- Father: Rao Raja Vikram Singh of Sikar
- Mother: Rani Bipula Singh
- Religion: Hinduism

Himani, Crown Princess of Nepal (born October 1, 1976) is the wife of the former heir apparent to the throne of Nepal, Crown Prince Paras.

== Biography ==
Born in Kathmandu, Nepal, Himani was born as Princess Himani Singh of Sikar. She is the second daughter of Shri Rao Raja Vikram Singh, the 12th King of Sikar and head of the family of Raoji clan and Rani Bipula Singh (née Kumari Bipula Singh of Bajhang). Hence, she hails from the royal family of Sikar in Rajasthan from her paternal side and from the royal family of Bajhang in Nepal from her maternal side. She is a Surya Vanshi - Shekhawat Rajput. She did her schooling from Mahendra Bhawaan School, Kathmandu.

She completed her intermediate education in commerce, from Galaxy Public School, in Kathmandu.

Her sisters are Rajkumari Reshma Singh and Rajkumari Aparna Singh, a doctor.

Princess Himani married Prince Paras on 25 January 2000. Her husband was appointed Crown Prince of Nepal on October 26, 2001, meaning she became the Crown Princess amidst various royal protocols. They have three children.

- Princess Purnika (born December 12, 2000, in Kathmandu).
- Prince Hridayendra (born July 30, 2002, in Kathmandu).
- Princess Kritika (born October 16, 2004, in Kathmandu).

Saptahik, the weekly Nepali magazine named the former Crown Princess as the most attractive woman of 2018. She had come in 2nd in 2017 and always featured in the list.

On 30 November 2023, former Crown Princess Himani was awarded the Gusi Peace Prize International Awards 2023 in Manila, Philippines for her philanthropic contributions through Himani Trust.

== Social works ==
Established on September 28, 2010, the Himani Trust was founded by the former Crown Princess as a non-profit and apolitical non-governmental organization to work on national services. It works towards uplifting the quality of life in important sectors such as sustainable livelihood, children, education, health, senior citizens, environment and natural disasters.

In 2015, the former Crown Princess observed and collected information about the earthquake resistant building built by Japan International Cooperation Agency (JICA) to help rebuild earthquake resistant buildings in earthquake hit Gorkha.

As the Chairman of Himani Trust, the former Crown Princess stressed the need to correct the draft of the constitution as per the wishes of people. Addressing a press conference in 2015, Shah said “I am expressing my opinion as a common Nepali citizen. The voice of the people must be incorporated in the constitution. Her remarks came after the government's failure to respond to the victims of the 2015 earthquake while the Himani Trust was actively involved in 22 different places with relief materials and construction of temporary shelters.

On December 9, 2016, the former royal attended a function organised to lay the foundation stone for the school building of Bhawani Secondary School, in Palungtar of Gorkha district. The Shah-led Himani Trust and the Buddhist Association of Japan funded the construction.

As president of Himani Trust, the former Crown princess unveiled a book entitled Sandesh Sangraha, a compilation of speeches delivered by her father in law and former King Gyanendra. The former royal who had also extended financial assistance to the 2015 earthquake victims, announced that all the proceeds of the book sales would be used to set up a disaster relief fund for the victims of natural disasters during a press conference in August 2019.

With the abolition of monarchy, the former crown princess has dedicated much of her time to social works through Himani Trust and is believed to have done more social work than the government. Most of the donations are contributed by the former royal family members. Some of the works of Himani Trust

- Flood relief in Parsa and Bara in 2017
- Earthquake relief programs in Bhaktapur, Lalitpur, Gorkha, Sindhupalchok, Solukhumbu
- Drinking water and sanitation user's committee at Nawalparasi in 2014
- Blood donation program in 2014
- Disabled relief to Khagendra New Life Disabled Association in 2013
- Flood relief in Surkhet in 2013
- Education infrastructure support at Namdu in 2013
- Repair and maintenance of Janajyoti School, Kailash Madhyamik Vidhyalaya and Lati Uchha Madhyamik Vidhyalaya
- Flood relief at Darchula, Tikapur, Bheemdatta in 2013
- Fire relief at Siraha and Aurahi
- Flood relief for Ref Cross for Pokhara Seti river in 2012
- Public awareness programs at Jaladevi Lower Secondary School in 2012
- Education support to Namdu in 2012
- Health camp program in January 2011

Tamakoshi River bridge fencing in 2011

== Honours ==
National Honours

- Member of the Order of Gorkha Dakshina Bahu, 1st class (23/10/2001).
- Member of the Order of Om Rama Patta (07/07/2004).
- King Gyanendra Investiture Medal (04/06/2001).
