= All Nepal Trade Union Federation =

Trade union in Nepal

ANTUF
- All Nepal Federation of Trade Unions
- अखिल नेपाल टेूड युनियन महासंघ
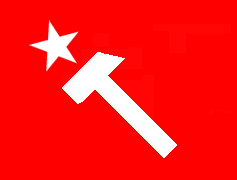
- Founded: 2007
- Type: Trade union
- Headquarters: Perisdanda-35, Kathmandu
- Location: Nepal
- Members: 425,000
- Key people: Jagat Bahadur Simkhada, President
- Affiliations: ITUC
- Website: www.antuf.org.np

The All Nepal Federation of Trade Unions (ANTUF; Nepali: अखिल नेपाल टेूड युनियन महासंघ) is a national trade union center representing workers in Nepal. The organization formed during the Nepalese Civil War and was created by activists from the Communist Party of Nepal (Maoist). Following the peace accords in 2006, the ANTUF was founded in 2007. The ANTUF is made up of 30 affiliated organisations. In January 2019, following the creation of the Nepal Communist Party, talks commenced for a merger between the ANTUF and the General Federation of Nepalese Trade Unions (GEFONT).

== Affiliates ==
The ANTUF has 30 affiliated unions:

* All Nepal Agriculture Workers' Union
- All Nepal Artist Workers' Union
- All Nepal Auto-Mechanic Workers' Union
- All Nepal Beautician Workers' Union
- All Nepal Brick Factory Workers' Union
- All Nepal Carpet Workers' Union
- All Nepal Cleaning Workers' Union
- All Nepal Communication, Press and Publication Workers' Union
- All Nepal Construction Workers' Union
- All Nepal Domestic Workers' Union
- All Nepal Garment and Textile Workers' Union
- All Nepal Government, Temporary, Daily Wage, Contract Workers' Union
- All Nepal Health Workers' Union
- All Nepal Hotel, Casino and Restaurant Workers' Union
- All Nepal Industrial Workers' Union
- All Nepal Institution, Bank and Finance Workers' Union
- All Nepal Metal Workers' Union
- All Nepal Painter Workers' Union
- All Nepal Petroleum Workers' Union
- All Nepal Progressive Migrant Workers Forum
- All Nepal Rickshaw Workers' Union
- All Nepal Road Workers' Union
- All Nepal Security Workers' Union
- All Nepal Self-Employed Workers' Union
- All Nepal Shop and Sales Workers' Union
- All Nepal Social Institution National Workers' Forum
- All Nepal Steel Workers' Union
- All Nepal Tea Workers' Union
- All Nepal Tourism Workers' Union
- All Nepal Transport Workers' Union
