= Praveen Gurung =

Nepalese singer and music arranger

Praveen Gurung प्रवीण गुरुङ
- Born: Dev Bahadur Gurung; April 30, 1962; Lumle, Nepal
- Died: August 6, 2000 (aged 38) Kathmandu, Nepal
- Genres: Gurung Folk; Pop
- Instruments: Vocal, Piano, Accordion, "Various nepali string and percussion instruments"
- Labels: Ratna Recording Corporation

Praveen Gurung (Nepali: प्रवीण गुरुङ, 30 April 1962 –6 August 2000) was a folk music singer and music arranger from Nepal who arranged over five hundred recordings during his career in both Nepali and Gurung. His work is well known throughout Nepal. His song yo daju ko mirmire aankhaa (यो दाजुको मिर्मिरे आँखा) ... is still a widely popular duet.

== Early life ==
Praveen was raised in the musical environment of the Gurung people to which he belonged. In 1980 at the age of eighteen he joined the regionally famous folk group Danfe Kala Mandir in Pokhara as a dancer and singer. By 1983 Praveen had moved to Kathmandu and recorded his first song at Radio Nepal. He was awarded Ratna Recording Corporation's folk song prize that year for his recording Tesaita nabune ko dali. He recorded at least five major albums solely in his local dialect.

Praveen often performed in the traditional Rodhi Ghar. A Rodhi Ghar is a communal gathering place among Gurung people where singing and dancing takes place after work.

== Death ==
Gurung was killed in a road accident when a Jeep allegedly driven by Prince Paras Shah struck and killed him as he crossed a road in Kathmandu. An "innocent person" was said to have taken responsibility for the accident, preventing the prince's prosecution despite widespread opposition from human rights activists. Gurung is survived by his wife Shanti Gurung and their two children.
