= Independent Transport Workers Association of Nepal =

Trade union in Nepal

ITWAN
- Independent Transport Workers Association of Nepal
- Founded: 1979
- Type: Trade union
- Members: 81,075 (2022)
- Affiliations: GEFONT

The Independent Transport Workers Association of Nepal (ITWAN) was a Nepalese trade union formed in 1979. The union existed as a separate entity until 1989, when it helped form the General Federation of Nepalese Trade Unions.
