= Democratic Confederation of Nepalese Trade Unions =

Central trade union organization in Nepal

DECONT
- Democratic Confederation of Nepalese Trade Unions
- Merged into: Nepal Trade Union Congress
- Founded: May 1, 1997
- Dissolved: March 2, 2008
- Headquarters: Kathmandu, Nepal
- Location: Nepal
- Key people: Rajendra Bahadur Raut, president Khila Nath Dahal, general secretary
- Affiliations: WCL, ITUC

Democratic Confederation of Nepalese Trade Unions (DECONT) was a trade union organization in Nepal. DECONT was affiliated with the Nepali Congress (Democratic) (NC). The president of DECONT was Rajendra Bahadur Raut.

DECONT was formed after a split from the Nepal Trade Union Congress, the trade union wing of the Nepali Congress, and was constituted on May 1, 1997. The DECONT-NTUC split predated the NC(D)-NC split. The Sher Bahadur Deuba faction of the NC had a separate trade union wing, before a separate party was established.

In May 2005, DECONT joined the World Confederation of Labour. During the spring of 2006, DECONT took part in the protests against the regime of King Gyanendra.

On March 2, 2008, it merged with Nepal Trade Union Congress, forming the Nepal Trade Union Congress-Independent.

== Affiliates ==
The following unions were affiliated with DECONT:

1. Nepal Building Construction Worker's Union
2. Nepal Emigration & Airport Employees Union
3. Nepal Film Hall Workers' Union
4. Nepal Carpet Workers' Union
5. Nepal Painter, Plumber & Wiring Workers' Union
6. Nepal Transport Workers' Union
7. Nepal Garment Workers' Union
8. Nepal Hotel Workers' Union
9. Construction & Allied Workers' Union of Nepal
10. Nepal Agricultural Worker's Union
11. Nepal Barbers' Union
