= Union of Trekking Travels Rafting Workers Nepal =

Trade union in Nepal

UNITRAV
- Union of Trekking Travels Rafting Workers Nepal
- Founded: 1984
- Headquarters: Kathmandu, Nepal
- Location: Nepal
- Members: 9,328 (2022)
- Key people: Suman Prasad Parajuli, president
- Affiliations: GEFONT, IUF

The Union of Trekking Travels Rafting Workers Nepal (UNITRAV) is a Nepali trade union founded in 1994. The organisation was originally constituted as the Trekking Workers Association of Nepal (TWAN) in 1984, a structure adopted as trade unions were illegal during the rule of the absolute monarchy. TWAN was a founding member of the General Federation of Nepalese Trade Unions (GEFONT) in 1989.

UNITRAV organise workers in the trekking sector, such as guides and porters, as well as in the travel, rafting, airline and cargo sectors. Decision-making in the union is conducted through an executive committee, which includes representatives from each of the sectors UNITRAV organises.

On 23 May 2008, UNITRAV member Dorje Khatri raised the union's flag atop Mount Everest.
