= Nepal Independent Hotel Workers Union =

NIHWU
- Nepal Independent Hotel Workers Union
- Founded: 1981
- Members: 16,263 (2022)
- Key people: Surya Bahadur Kunwar, president
- Affiliations: GEFONT, IUF

The Nepal Independent Hotel Workers Union (NIHWU) is a Nepalese trade union formed in 1981. The union existed as a separate entity until 1989 when it helped form the General Federation of Nepalese Trade Unions.
