= Nepal Trade Union Congress =

Trade union in Nepal

- नेपाल ट्रेड युनियन कांग्रेस
- Abbreviation: NTUC
- Founded: March 4, 1947; 79 years ago
- Type: Trade union
- Headquarters: Kathmandu, Nepal
- Location: Nepal
- Members: 453,000 (2025)
- President: Yogendra Kumar Kunwar
- Senior vice president: Tejendra Jung Karki
- General secretary: Ajay Kumar Rai
- Parent organization: Nepali Congress
- Affiliations: ITUC
- Website: www.ntuc.org.np

The Nepal Trade Union Congress (NTUC) is a national trade union center in Nepal. Founded in 1947, it is the first and largest trade union confederation in the country. The NTUC is affiliated with the Nepali Congress (NC). NTUC states that its mission is to "raise the living standard of the workers for sustainable development by cooperating with stakeholders to ensure dignified work while remaining committed to democratic socialism."

In 2008, the NTUC and the Democratic Confederation of Nepalese Trade Unions (DECONT) merged to form the NTUC-Independent (DECONT had split from the NTUC in 1997). While still known as NTUC-I, the union has reverted to the former name.

The 6th National Congress was held on June 12–15, 2018 in Kathmandu, which elected Pushkar Acharya as president. The NTUC has 26 sectoral unions and 7 province committees.

== Affiliates ==
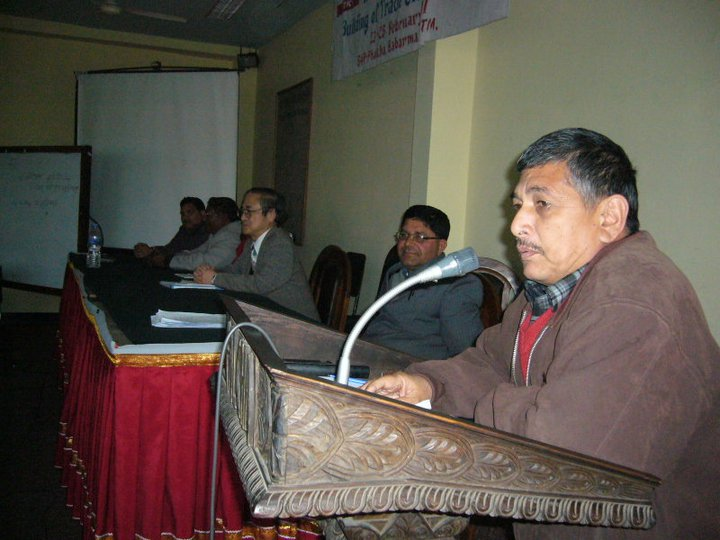
Former Senior Vice President Ramjee Kunwar addressing a program organized by NTUCI and JILAF.

The following are unions are affiliated with NTUC:

- Agriculture Workers Union of Nepal (AWUN)
- Barber Union of Nepal
- Construction and Allied Workers Union of Nepal (CAWUN)
- Financial Institute Employees Union of Nepal (FIEUN)
- Health Professional's Organization of Nepal
- Local Level Employee Union Nepal
- Nepal Agriculture Workers' Union
- Nepal Auto Rickshaw and E Rickshaw Workers Union
- Nepal Beautician Union
- Nepal Carpet Workers Union (NCWU)
- Nepal Commercial and Allied Workers Union
- Nepal Cultural and Artist Union
- Nepal Customs Airport Allied Workers Union
- Nepal Embroidery, Handicraft, and Sewing & Knitting Workers Union
- Nepal Factory Labour Union (NFLU)
- Nepal Film Workers Union
- Nepal Garment Workers Union
- Nepal Home Workers Union
- Nepal Livestock Health Service Technician Association
- Nepal National Security Guard Workers Union
- Nepal Porter Union
- Nepal Press Union (NPU)
- Nepal Printing Press & Allied Workers Union (NPPAWU)
- Nepal Teachers Association (NTA)
- Nepal Tourism and Hotel Allied Workers Union
- Nepal Tourism and Hotel Worker's Union
- Nepal Transport Workers Union (NETWON)
- Union of Public Services in Nepal
