= Prerana Shah Singh =

Princess Prerana
- Princess of Nepal
- Born: 20 February 1978 (age 48); Kathmandu, Nepal
- Spouse: Kumar Raj Bahadur Singh (m. 2003)
- Issue: Parthav Bahadur Singh
Names
- Prerana Rajya Lakshmi Devi Singh
- Dynasty: Shah dynasty
- Father: Gyanendra of Nepal
- Mother: Komal of Nepal
- Religion: Hinduism

Princess Prerana Rajya Lakshmi Devi Singh of Nepal (Nepali: प्रेरणा राज्यलक्ष्मी सिंह; born 20 February 1978) is the daughter of Gyanendra, the last king of Nepal, and Queen Komal.

== Life ==
She attended University of Roehampton, Surrey, United Kingdom (BA).

Name Prerana means "Inspiration" in Nepali.

Princess Prerana married Kumar Raj Bahadur Singh on 22 January 2003. The wedding took place at Narayanhity Palace; the bride wore a red sari woven with gold thread.

They have one son:

- Parthav Bahadur Singh (b. 10 October 2004 at King Birendra Military Hospital, Chhauni).

== Abolition of monarchy in Nepal ==
The monarchy in Nepal was abolished in 2008 after the Constituent Assembly election.

== Health ==
On 8 April 2017, Princess Prerana was hospitalised at the Thapathali-based Norvic International Hospital after suffering a stroke.

“She might need to stay at the hospital quite longer,” a hospital source said, informing that her condition was stable.

Consultant neurologist Dr Pankaj Jalan has been attending to the former royal.

The hospital has been just giving her “a conservative medication” and observing the effects, the source added.

It has been learned that Gyanendra visited his 39-year-old daughter at the Hospital on Friday and Saturday.

On 20 April 2021 the former king and queen tested positive for COVID-19 on their return from the Maha Kumbh, a religious festival in India attended by millions of Hindu pilgrims. The couple and their daughter Prerana Rajya Lakshmi Devi Singh were admitted to the Norvic International Hospital in Kathmandu for treatment.

== Patronages ==
- Vice-Chairman of The Himani Trust.

== Honours ==
National Honours

- Member First Class of the Order of Gorkha Dakshina Bahu, 1st class (23/10/2001).
- Member of the Order of Tri Shakti Patta, 1st class (21/10/2005).
- Commemorative Silver Jubilee Medal of King Birendra (31/01/1997).
- King Gyanendra Investiture Medal (04/06/2001).
