= All Nepal Trade Union Congress =

Trade union in Nepal

- Formation: 1946
- Dissolved: 1960
- Type: Trade union
- Location: Nepal

The All Nepal Trade Union Congress (ANTUC) was a trade union in Nepal.

It formed in 1946. The union was formed by a mixture of communists and socialists, the latter group leaving in 1950 to form the Nepal Workers Union (Majdoor Sabha), however they received little support. In 1951, the Biratnagar Workers Union (BWU) merged with ANTUC. ANTUC joined the World Federation of Trade Unions in 1953. ANTUC was banned in 1960 after the Panchayat system was implemented. In 1979, unions were re-legalised; the Nepal Independent Workers Union and other unions succeeded ANTUC.
