= General Federation of Nepalese Trade Unions =

Trade union in Nepal

GEFONT
- General Federation of Nepalese Trade Unions
- Founded: 20 July 1989
- Headquarters: Kathmandu, Nepal
- Location: Nepal
- Members: 449,766 (2026)
- Key people: Binod Shrestha, President; Laxman Sharma, Secretary General
- Affiliations: ITUC
- Website: www.gefont.org

The General Federation of Nepalese Trade Unions (GEFONT) (Nepali: नेपाल ट्रेड यूनियन महासंघ) is a trade union confederation in Nepal, consisting of 21 trade unions. It is affiliated with the Communist Party of Nepal (Unified Marxist–Leninist). GEFONT declares its goal to be "Socialism for the dignified working-class and prosperous life".

== History ==
Trade unions have existed in Nepal since the All Nepal Trade Union Congress was formed in 1946, but came into power after the collapse of the Rana dynasty in 1951 and the movement towards democracy. GEFONT was established on 20 July 1989 by the Nepal Independent Workers Union, the Independent Transport Workers Association of Nepal, the Nepal Independent Hotel Workers Union, and the Trekking Workers Association of Nepal. At the time of its foundation, it functioned as the trade union wing of the then underground Communist Party of Nepal (Marxist-Leninist).

The federation played an active role in the 1990 Nepalese revolution. When CPN(ML) merged with the Communist Party of Nepal (Marxist) to form CPN(UML), the trade union of CPN(M), Nepal Trade Union Centre, merged into GEFONT. GEFONT was a founding member of the International Trade Union Confederation in November 2006.

GEFONT supported the 2006 Nepalese revolution. Four representatives were elected in the 2008 Constituent Assembly election and three elected in the 2013 elections.

The Integrated Centre of Trade Unions, Nepal split from GEFONT in 2021. In October 2025, GEFONT vice president Kamal Gautam died while giving a speech at a sit-in in Rupandehi.

GEFONT operates a women's committee dedicated to improving women's workplace rights and a youth committee to foster youth in GEFONT's leadership.

== Affiliates ==
GEFONT is affiliated with 21 trade unions:

- Bank, Finance & Cooperative Sector Employees Union (BAFSEU)
- Central Union of Painters, Plumbers, Electro and Construction Workers-Nepal (CUPPEC)
- Federation of Agricultural and Plantation Workers-Nepal (FAPWUN)
- Home Workers' Trade Union of Nepal (HUN)
- ICT, Media and Press Professionals Union-Nepal (IMPRESSION Nepal)
- Independent Tea-Coffee Workers' Union of Nepal (ITCWUN)
- Independent Transport-Workers' Association of Nepal (ITWAN)
- Jute Textile Garment & Carpet Workers' Union of Nepal (JTG-CWUN)
- National Beauticians' Union of Nepal (NABUN)
- Nepal Auto-Mechanics Trade Union (NATU)
- Nepal Garbage Cleaners' Employee's Union (NGCEU)
- Nepal Health Volunteers Association (NEVA)
- Nepal Health Workers and Employees Union (NHWEU)
- Nepal Independent Hotel Workers' Union (NIHWU)
- Nepal Security Labour Trade Union (NESTU)
- Nepal Street Vendors' Trade Union (NEST)
- Private & Boarding School Employees' Union, Nepal (PABSEU)
- Sports Union Nepal (SUN)
- Whole Industry Trade Union, Nepal (WHIN)
- Union of Trekking-Travel-Rafting & Airline Workers, Nepal (UNITRAV)
