= Nepal Independent Workers Union =

Nepalese trade union

NIWU
- Nepal Independent Workers Union
- Formation: 1979
- Type: Trade union
- Affiliations: Communist Party of Nepal (Marxist–Leninist), General Federation of Nepalese Trade Unions

The Nepal Independent Workers Union (NIWU) was a Nepalese trade union formed in 1979 as the labour wing of Communist Party of Nepal (Marxist-Leninist).

It was created following a General Strike in Balaju Industrial District, Kathmandu and existed as a separate entity until 1989 when it helped form the General Federation of Nepalese Trade Unions.
