= Gyanendra of Nepal =

King of Nepal (1950–1951; 2001–2008)

Gyanendra
- Shri Panch Maharajadhiraja
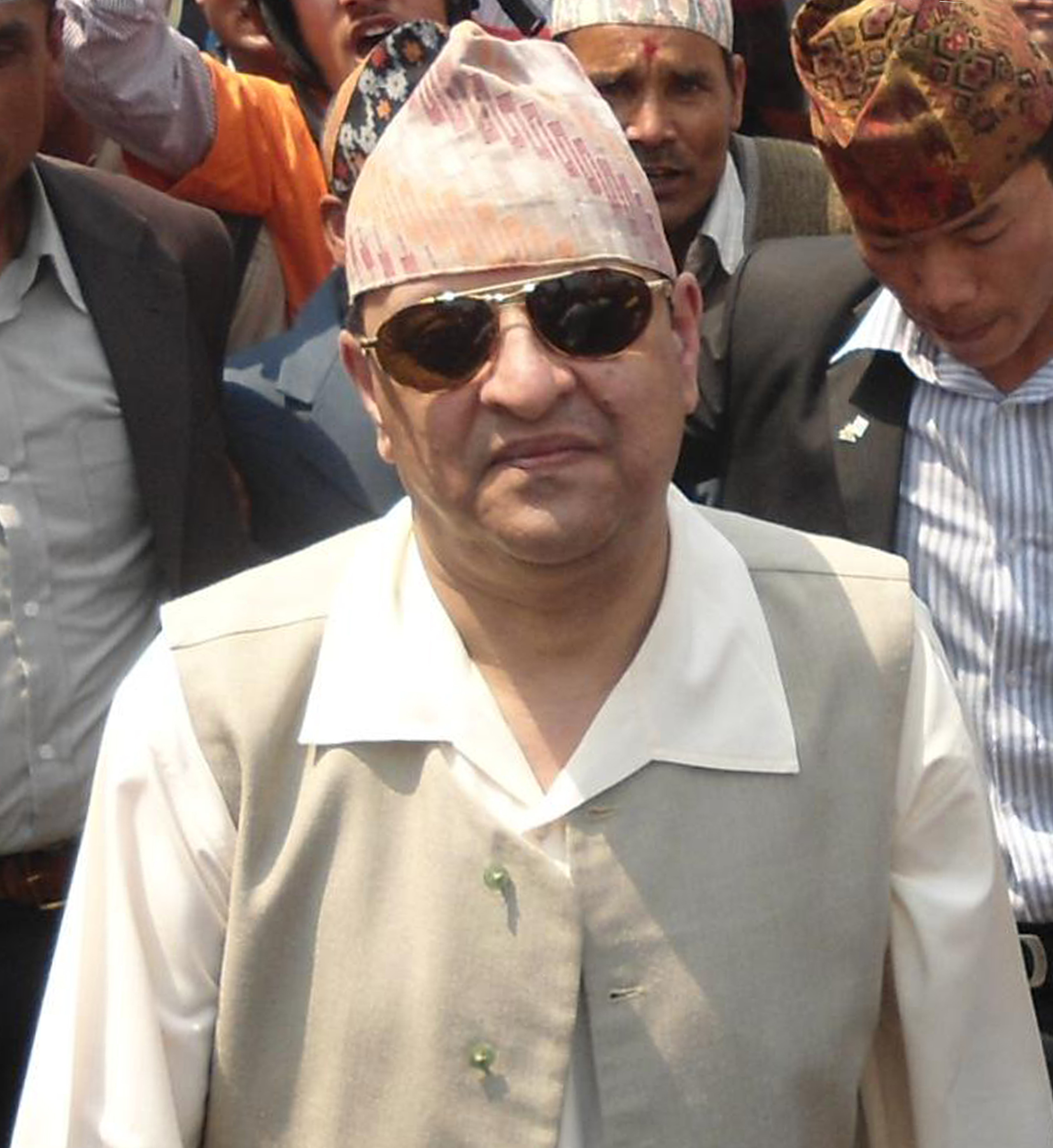
- Gyanendra in 2012

King of Nepal
- Reign: 1 June 2001 – 28 May 2008
- Coronation: 4 June 2001
- Predecessor: Dipendra
- Successor: Monarchy abolished; Girija Prasad Koirala; (as acting head of state)
- Regent: 1 June – 4 June 2001
- Prime Ministers: See list: Girija Prasad Koirala; Sher Bahadur Deuba; Lokendra Bahadur Chand; Surya Bahadur Thapa
- Reign: 7 November 1950 – 7 January 1951
- Acclamation: 7 November 1950
- Predecessor: Tribhuvan
- Successor: Tribhuvan
- Prime Minister: Mohan Shumsher
- Born: 7 July 1947 (age 79); Narayanhiti Durbar, Kingdom of Nepal
- Spouse: Komal Rajya Lakshmi (m. 1970)
- Issue: Paras, Crown Prince of Nepal; Princess Prerana
Regnal name
- Nepali: श्री ५ महाराजाधिराज ज्ञानेन्द्र वीर विक्रम शाह देव; Shri Panch Maharajadhiraja Gyanendra Bir Bikram Shah Dev
- Dynasty: Shah
- Father: Mahendra
- Mother: Indra Rajya Lakshmi
- Religion: Hinduism

Shree Panch Gyanendra Bir Bikram Shah Dev (Note: Nepali: ज्ञानेन्द्र वीर विक्रम शाह देव) (born 7 July 1947) is the former King of Nepal and the last monarch of Kingdom of Nepal. He ascended the throne on 4 June 2001 following the royal massacre and reigned until 28 May 2008, when the monarchy was abolished and the democratic republic was proclaimed. He had previously reigned from 7 November 1950 to 7 January 1951, when the Rana regime declared him king at the age of three after his grandfather, King Tribhuvan, and the royal family fled to India. His brief reign ended with Tribhuvan's restoration to the throne.

During the reign of his elder brother, King Birendra, King Gyanendra served as chairman of his father, King Mahendra' s Trust for Nature Conservation.

King Gyanendra's second reign, which began as a result of the Nepalese royal massacre, was characterised by constitutional upheaval. The growing insurgency of the Nepalese Civil War disrupted representative elections. Following several election delays, King Gyanendra suspended the constitution and assumed direct rule in February 2005, claiming that it was a temporary measure to suppress the Maoist insurgency after civilian governments failed to do so. In April 2006, facing widespread opposition, he restored Nepal's previous parliament. Following the signing of the Comprehensive Peace Accord between the government and the Maoists, he was deposed two years later by the first session of the Constituent Assembly, which declared a republic and ended the 240-year rule of the Shah dynasty.

== Early life and first reign ==
Gyanendra was born on 7 July 1947 as the second son of Crown Prince Mahendra and his first wife, Crown Princess Indra, in the old Narayanhiti Royal Palace in Kathmandu. After his birth, his father was told by a court astrologer not to look at his newborn son for it would bring him bad luck, so Gyanendra was sent to live with his grandmother.

In November 1950, during a political plot, both his father and his grandfather King Tribhuvan, along with other royals, fled to India, leaving the three-year-old Prince Gyanendra (who was living with his grandmother) as the only male member of the royal family in Nepal.

He was brought back to the capital Kathmandu by Prime Minister Mohan Shumsher Jung Bahadur Rana, and declared king on 7 November 1950. Coins were issued in his name and the Prime Minister allocated a 300,000 rupee annual budget as expenditure for the King.

After India voiced its opposition to the hereditary rule of the Rana dynasty as Prime Ministers of Nepal, a deal was reached in January 1951. Gyanendra's grandfather Tribhuvan returned to Nepal and resumed his reign. The actions of the Rana regime to depose his grandfather and place Gyanendra on the throne were not recognized as legitimate.

== Education and family ==
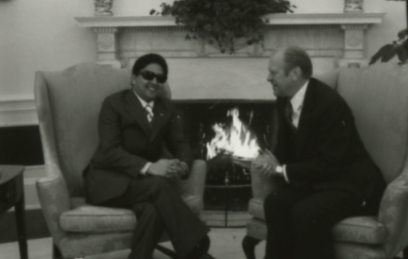
Prince Gyanendra Shah with United States President Gerald Ford in 1976

Gyanendra studied with his elder brother Birendra at St. Joseph's School, Darjeeling, India. In 1969, he graduated from Tribhuvan University, Kathmandu.

He served as the Chairman of the Advisory Committee for Birendra's coronation in 1975. He is a keen conservationist and had become chairman of the King Mahendra Trust for Nature Conservation (later known as the National Trust for Nature Conservation) in 1982.

Gyanendra married his second cousin Komal Rajya Lakhsmi Devi on 1 May 1970 in Kathmandu. They have two children:

- Prince Paras Bir Bikram Shah Dev (born on 30 December 1971).
- Princess Prerana Rajya Lakshmi Devi Singh (born on 20 February 1978).

== Second reign ==
=== Accession ===
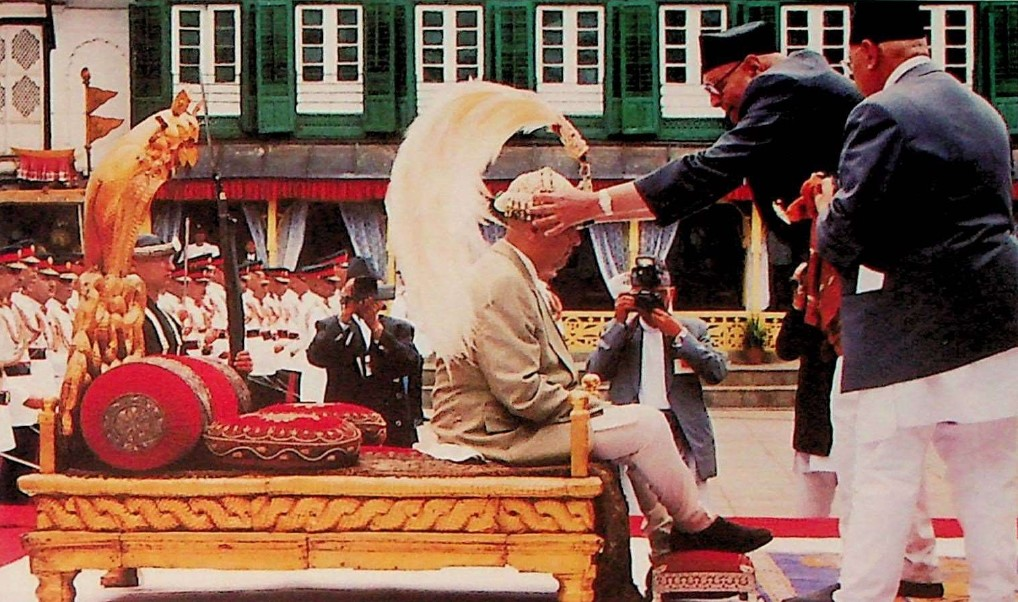
King Gyanendra's coronation in 2001

On 1 June 2001, Birendra and several other members of the royal family were killed in a massacre at the royal palace. Crown Prince Dipendra, who was seen as responsible for the killings, was proclaimed king by the privy council but as he was comatose after shooting himself, Gyanendra was designated regent for his nephew. Gyanendra was proclaimed king again after Dipendra's death on 4 June and was crowned the same day. He vowed to launch an investigation into the massacre shortly after his accession.

The massacre and the ensuing investigation proved very controversial. A two-man investigation team appointed by Gyanendra and made up of Keshav Prasad Upadhyaya, then Chief Justice of the Supreme Court of Nepal, and Taranath Ranabhat, then-Speaker of the House of Representatives, carried out a week-long investigation.

After interviewing more than 100 people—including eyewitnesses, palace officials, guards, and staff—they concluded that Dipendra had indeed carried out the massacre, but they drew no further conclusions.

=== Political crisis ===
During his early years on the throne, Gyanendra sought to exercise full control over the government, citing the failure of all the political parties to hold an election after the parliament was dissolved. In May 2002, he supported the popularly elected Prime Minister Sher Bahadur Deuba but in October 2002, he dismissed Deuba and consolidated his power for the first time.

His elder brother King Birendra had negotiated a constitutional monarchy during his rule in a delicate manner in which he, as king, played a minor role in government. Thus, Gyanendra's confrontational approach with the established political parties met with widespread censure. During the years 2002 to 2005 he chose and subsequently dismissed three prime ministers for failure to hold elections and bring the rebels to a round table negotiation.

On 1 February 2005, he dismissed Prime Minister Sher Bahadur Deuba's government for failing to make arrangements for parliamentary elections and being unable to restore peace in the country, which was then in the midst of a civil war led by Maoist insurgents. Although Gyanendra promised that "peace and effective democracy" would be restored within three years, the period of direct rule was accompanied by repression of dissent. International organizations expressed grave concerns about the safety of journalists, following the king's decision to restrict civil liberties, including freedom of the press, the constitutional protection against censorship and the right against preventive detention.

In April 2006, the seven-party alliance and the then banned CPN Maoist party staged protests and strikes in Kathmandu against King Gyanendra's direct rule. The royal government exercised minimum restraint but declared a curfew to control the deteriorating situation, which was enforced with live firearms and tear gas.

After 23 protesters were killed, on 21 April 2006, King Gyanendra announced that he would yield executive authority to a new prime minister chosen by the political parties to oversee the return of democracy. Several party leaders rejected the offer and again demanded that the King call a council to determine the monarchy's future role in politics.

An agreement was reached between the parties under the supervision of the Indian ruling Congress that the monarchy would have a place in the new constitution. Girija Prasad Koirala was appointed Prime Minister in the interim and, as the main leader, had talks with the King for the agreement of the monarchy's position. As such, on 24 April 2006, Gyanendra reinstated the previous parliament in a televised address to the nation.

=== End of direct rule ===
The agreement between the parties and Gyanendra under Indian supervision was not honored by the parties. It is widely believed that the then Prime Minister Girija Prasad Koirala was deeply convinced that as long as Gyanendra remained in the power structure, there was always danger to the democratic order in Nepal. On 10 June 2006, the Parliament scrapped the major powers of the King, including his right to veto laws. This ended the idea of a "King in Parliament", and he was reduced to a figurehead, though for a time he continued to offer felicitations and to receive diplomats. According to Article 167 of the constitution, all executive powers as well as those enjoyed by the King in the previous Constitution were now vested in the prime minister. All powers of the 239-year-old monarchy were stripped, making Gyanendra a civilian king.

On 15 January 2007, the interim parliament was set up with the Communist Party of Nepal (Maoist) included, and on 1 April 2007, the interim government joined by the Communist Party was formed.

Prime Minister Koirala, who had previously supported the continuation of the monarchy, said in March 2007 that he thought Gyanendra should step down. In June, Koirala repeated his call for Gyanendra to abdicate in favor of his grandson Prince Hridayendra.

On 23 August 2007, Nepal's transitional government nationalized all the properties Gyanendra inherited from his brother, including the Narayanhiti Royal Palace. The move did not affect the properties he owned before his accession to the throne.

== Abolition of the monarchy ==
It was announced on 24 December 2007 that, following the approval of the Nepalese Parliament, the monarchy would probably be suspended in 2008, as part of a peace deal with Maoist rebels. This was for a bill to amend the constitution to make Nepal a republic.

On 28 December 2007, the Nepali interim parliament approved a bill for the amendment to the constitution of 1990 promulgated on 15 January 2007, with a clause stating that Nepal would become a federal democratic republic, to be implemented by the first meeting of the Constituent Assembly elections.

Gyanendra, in an interview with foreign reporters published on 9 April 2008, expressed dissatisfaction over the decision made by the interim parliament to abolish the monarchy after the 10 April Constituent Assembly election. The interview was published in Japan's leading newspaper, Daily Yomiuri. Speaking to a select group of Japanese correspondents at the Narayanhiti Palace on 4 February 2008, Gyanendra said, "[The decision] doesn't reflect the majority view of the people. This isn't a democracy." However, he conceded that the people had the right to choose the fate of the monarchy.

On 27 May 2008, the Constituent Assembly decided to give Gyanendra fifteen days to vacate the palace and scheduled its first session for the next day at 11 am; however, it was delayed due to the indecision among the leading parties on power-sharing and the nomination of 26 members of the Constituent Assembly.

On 28 May 2008, the monarchy was formally abolished after the Constituent Assembly voted to amend the constitution to refer to the country as a republic. Gyanendra accepted the decision in the following days. As he was required to leave the Narayanhiti Palace, he asked the government to make residential arrangements for him on 1 June, and on 4 June the government decided to give Nagarjuna Palace to Gyanendra.

In an interview, Gyanendra's advisor, Bharat Keshar Singh, claimed that the bill passed by the parliament was a bluff. Replying to a question raised regarding the King's silence even after the bill was passed declaring the state a republic, he said that there was nothing for the King to respond to. He claimed that the parliament which declared a republic was reinstated by the King himself and had no authority to dethrone the same King. He claimed that the King was examining the activities of the government and the parliament and was waiting for a suitable time to respond to them. He said that no people would accept the "bill" unless decided by a referendum or elected members in the constituent assembly.

Gyanendra left the Narayanhiti Palace in Kathmandu on 11 June 2008, moving into the Nagarjuna Palace. His new residence consisted of ten buildings including the royal residence Hemanta Bas, three guesthouses (Barsha Bas, Sharad Bas and Grishma Bas), one office secretariat and one staff quarters. Gyanendra and his family moved into the two-storey Hemanta Bas. Following his departure, the Narayanhiti Palace was turned into a museum, while Gyanendra's diamond- and ruby-encrusted Crown and royal scepter, along with all the other crown jewels and royal assets, became government property. The royal family's departure from the palace was reported as a "major symbolic moment in the fall of the Shah dynasty, which had unified Nepal in the 1760s".

== Later life ==
In an interview with News24 TV channel in 2012, Gyanendra stated that he would return as King, although he did not state a particular timeframe. When asked if he would consider becoming actively involved in politics, he said that he is not a politician. He also dismissed the need for a referendum on bringing the institution of monarchy back to power. He asserted that since the politicians had not asked the people by a referendum to abolish the institution, a referendum was not needed to bring him back. Gyanendra also stated in the interview with News24 that a written agreement existed between the politicians and himself that the constitutional monarchy would be returned when he gave up his powers to the politicians and restored the Parliament that he had sacked.

Soon after news emerged of a ten-day personal visit to Parbat district in 2012, ten political parties of the district organized a corner meeting at Shivalaya Chowk of Kushma bazaar, and decided to protest against Gyanendra's visit. Leaders speaking at the corner assembly called on Gyanendra to stop his visit and also warned that they would obstruct his tour forcibly if he started it. Nevertheless, Gyanendra left for Pokhara. There was no protest on the first day. He walked in the rain through the general public for more than one kilometre. However, the scheduled visit of Gyanendra to Myagdi was cancelled following opposition from different political parties. He had planned to worship at various holy shrines in the district.

On 8 July 2019, the former King's birthday was observed by thousands of Nepalese who marked the occasion by marching to his private residence at Nirmal Niwas Palace. The rally was organized by the Main Civilian Birthday Celebration Committee. Gyanendra refused to meet with the crowd on the grounds that he did not celebrate his birthday in public due to the demise of his relatives. Therefore, the visitors wrote birthday wishes on registers kept at the Nirmal Niwas Palace.

In July 2019, the former King summoned a political analyst Surendra K.C. and the two discussed the current political environment of the nation. In an interview with Nepal Aaja, KC remarked that the former King did not show any active interest to return to the throne or into politics. However, KC did note that the former monarch showed great concern for the condition of the Nepalese in times of economic turmoil and political suppression. In February 2023, the former king attended a public event in Jhapa district to call for the transformation of Nepal from a secular country into a Hindu kingdom. The event was attended by thousands of people.

In 2020 the Rastriya Prajatantra Party submitted 2.35 million signatures to the Constituent Assembly demanding a referendum for the fate of the 240-year-old monarchy and a Hindu state.

=== Bhutan visit ===
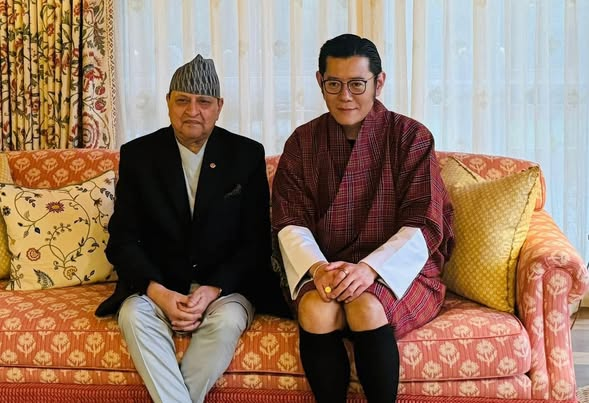
Gyanendra with the King of Bhutan, Jigme Khesar Namgyel Wangchuck, at the Dechencholing Palace during a private visit in October 2024

In October 2024, Gyanendra visited Bhutan at the invitation of the Bhutanese royal family. He was welcomed at the airport by Princess Pema Lhaden Wangchuck. A red carpet was rolled out for him upon his arrival, underscoring the significance of his visit. Gyanendra along with his daughter Princess Prerana Shah and niece Princess Sitashma Shah met with former King Jigme Singye Wangchuck of Bhutan, the Queen grandmother Ashi Kesang Choden, and the current King Jigme Khesar Namgyel Wangchuck, Queen Jetsun Pema, and their two children, Jigme Namgyel Wangchuck and Jigme Ugyen Wangchuck, at the Dechencholing Palace in Bhutan. After their meeting, King Jigme Khesar Wangchuck bid farewell to Gyanendra at the royal guest house in Thimphu.

=== 2025 protests ===
On 18 February 2025, Gyanendra published a video address saying that he was worried about the state of democracy in Nepal and urged people to support him for unity, peace, and development. He received massive public support during his pilgrimage to Galeshwar Dham, Baglung Kalika, and Pokhara, with crowds chanting "Raja aau, Desh bachau" (King must come to save the country).

A rally in Kathmandu on 5 March 2025 saw participation from the Rashtriya Prajatantra Party (RPP) and Durga Prasai led "Save the Nation, Culture, and Dharma" campaign. RPP canceled other events to organize a grand welcome for him in Kathmandu on March 9, when he returned from his six-week stay in Pokhara.

== Wealth ==
Despite having all of the properties he inherited from his late brother King Birendra nationalized, Gyanendra still retained all of his wealth prior to his enthronement. Having been a state connected businessman, the former king is said to have inherited huge fortunes from his family members and still runs many lucrative businesses through investments and is widely believed to be worth hundreds of millions of dollars.

In 2008, journalist Surya Thapa stated that King Gyanendra had an investment of at least $200 million in 35 companies throughout Nepal and possibly more abroad. His investment in Soaltee Hotel alone was estimated to be around $100 million in 2008 with a 47% stake.

Furthermore, the former King is reported to have 54% stake in Himalayan Goodricke Tea, 39% stake in Surya Nepal Tobacco, stakes in Annapurna Hotel which he inherited from aunt Princess Helen, stakes in Himal International Power Corporation, Jyoti Spinning Mill in Birgunj, Narayanghat Brewery, a Toyota and Tata distributorship, Laxmi Rosin Turpentine Pvt Ltd, Bhotekoshi power company, Sipradi Trading Pvt Ltd, Gorkha Lawrie Pvt Ltd, Amaravati Pvt Ltd., an island in the Maldives and oil interests in Nigeria.

Furthermore, the former King also owns vast swathes of lands throughout Nepal, an extensive real estate portfolio that includes the Nirmal Niwas Palace, his personal residence of approximately 36 ropani land at a prime location at Maharajgunj and, large tea plantations in Damak. He is also reported to possess invaluable Shah and Rana dynasty heirlooms, precious jewels and artwork.

== Honours ==
=== National orders ===
- Sovereign of the Order of Nepal Pratap Bhaskara
- Sovereign of the Order of Ojaswi Rajanya
- Sovereign of the Order of Nepal Taradisha
- Sovereign of the Order of Tri Shakti Patta
- Sovereign of the Order of Gorkha Dakshina Bahu
- Most Glorious Mahendra Chain
- Birendra Chain (29 December 2002)
- King Mahendra Investiture Medal (2 May 1956)
- King Birendra Investiture Medal (24 February 1975)
- Commemorative Silver Jubilee Medal of King Birendra (31 January 1997)

=== Foreign orders ===
Arms of Gyanendra as knight of the Order of Isabella the Catholic

- Bhutan: King Jigme Singye Investiture Medal (2 June 1974)
- France: Grand Cross of the National Order of Merit, 2 May 1983
- Germany: Grand Cross of the Order of Merit of the Federal Republic of Germany, 25 November 1996
- South Korea:
  - Grand Gwanghwa Medal (First Class) of the Order of Diplomatic Service Merit, 1987
  - Commander of the Order of the Golden Ark, 1987
- Pakistan: Nishan-e-Imtiaz, 1970
- Saudi Arabia: Member Special Class of the Order of King Abdulaziz, 1983
- Spain: Knight Grand Cross of the Order of Isabella the Catholic, 13 November 1987
- Thailand: Knight Grand Cordon of the Order of the White Elephant, 1995
- United Kingdom: Honorary Knight Grand Cross of the Order of St. Michael and St. George, 1986
- Yugoslavia: Sash of the Order of the Yugoslav Star 1st Rank, 2 February 1974

== Notes ==
Gyanendra of Nepal House of Shah Born: 7 July 1947
Regnal titles
Preceded by Tribhuvan	King of Nepal; 1950–1951	Succeeded by Tribhuvan
Preceded by Dipendra	King of Nepal; 2001–2008	Republic declared Girija Prasad Koirala as acting head of state
Titles in pretence
Loss of title Monarchy abolished	— TITULAR — King of Nepal; 2008 – present	Incumbent; Heir: Paras
