= Maharaja =

Indian princely title

Maharaja (Note: /ˌmɑː(h)əˈrɑːdʒə/ MAH-(h)ə-RAH-jə) (also spelled Maharajah or Maharaj; lit. 'great ruler'; feminine: Maharani or Maharajin) is a royal title in the Indian subcontinent of Sanskrit origin. In modern India and medieval northern India, the title was equivalent to a prince. However, in late ancient India and medieval south India, the title denoted a king.

The form "Maharaj" (without "-a") indicates a separation of noble and religious offices; although since in Marathi the suffix -a is silent, the two titles are near homophones. Historically, the title "Maharaja" has been used by kings since Vedic times, in the second century by the Indo-Greek rulers (such as the kings Apollodotus I and Menander I), then later by the Indo-Scythians (such as the king Maues), and by the Kushans as a higher ranking variant of "Raja". Eventually, during the medieval era, the title "Maharaja" came to be used by sovereign princes and vassal princes, and the title "Maharajadhiraja" was used by sovereign kings. Eventually, during the Mughal and British eras, Maharaja too came to be used by princes, though it was used by sovereign kings as well, such as the King of Maratha.

== Etymology ==
The word Maharaja originates in Sanskrit and is a compound karmadhāraya term from mahānt- "great" and rājan "ruler, king"). It has the Latin cognates magnus "great" and rex "king". Due to Sanskrit's major influence on the vocabulary of most languages in Greater India and Southeast Asia, the term Maharaja is common to many modern Indo-Aryan and Dravidian languages. The Sanskrit title Maharaja was originally used only for rulers who ruled a considerably large region with minor tributary rulers under them. Since medieval times, the title was used by (Hindu) monarchs of lesser states claiming descent from ancient maharajas.

== South Asia ==
=== Raja as a ruler's title ===
Maharajas

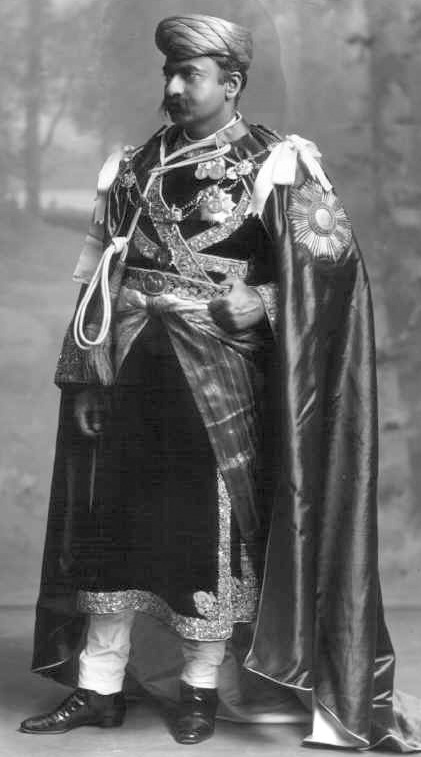
Maharaja Bhagvat-Singh of Gondal

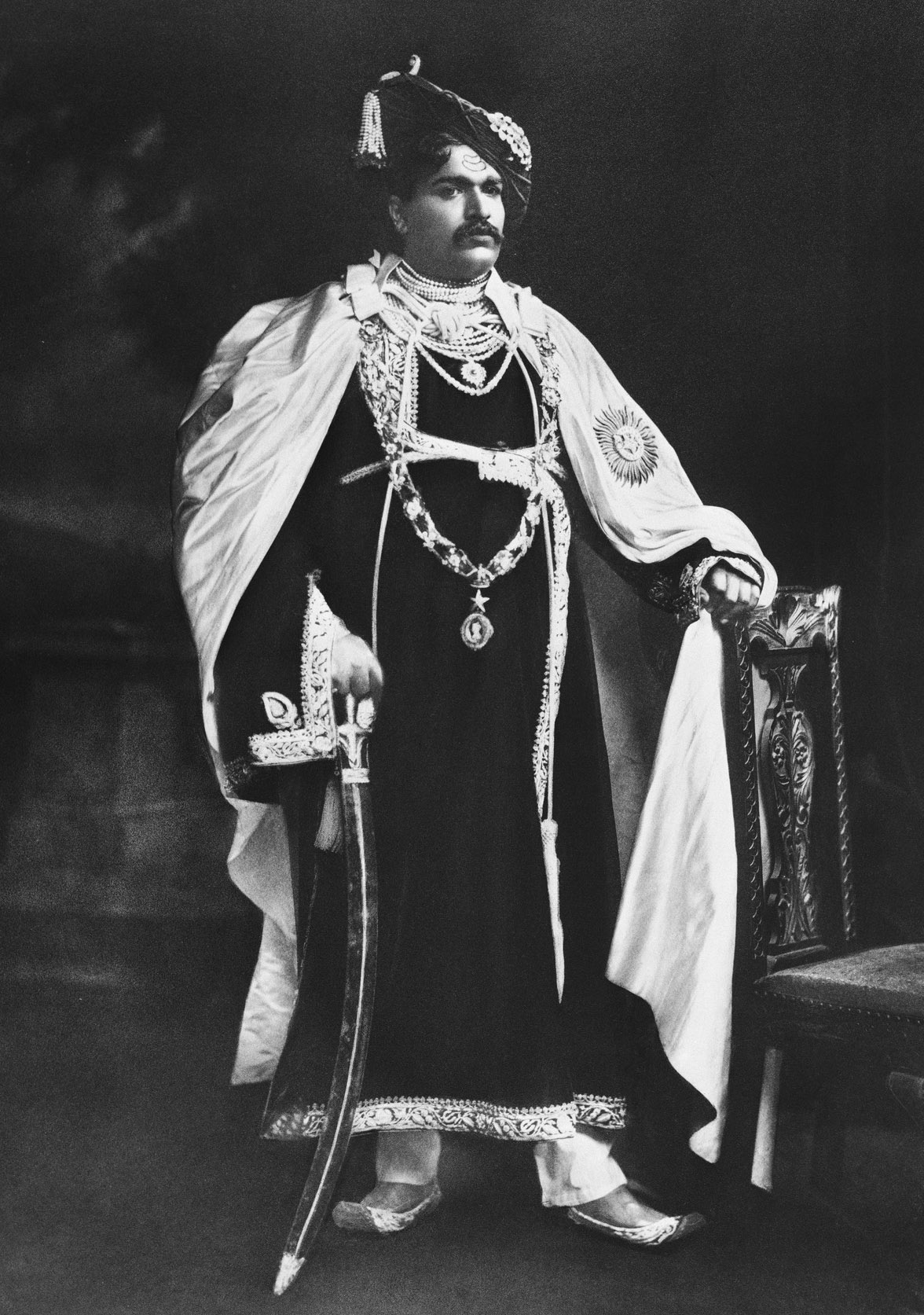
The Maratha Shahu of Kolhapur

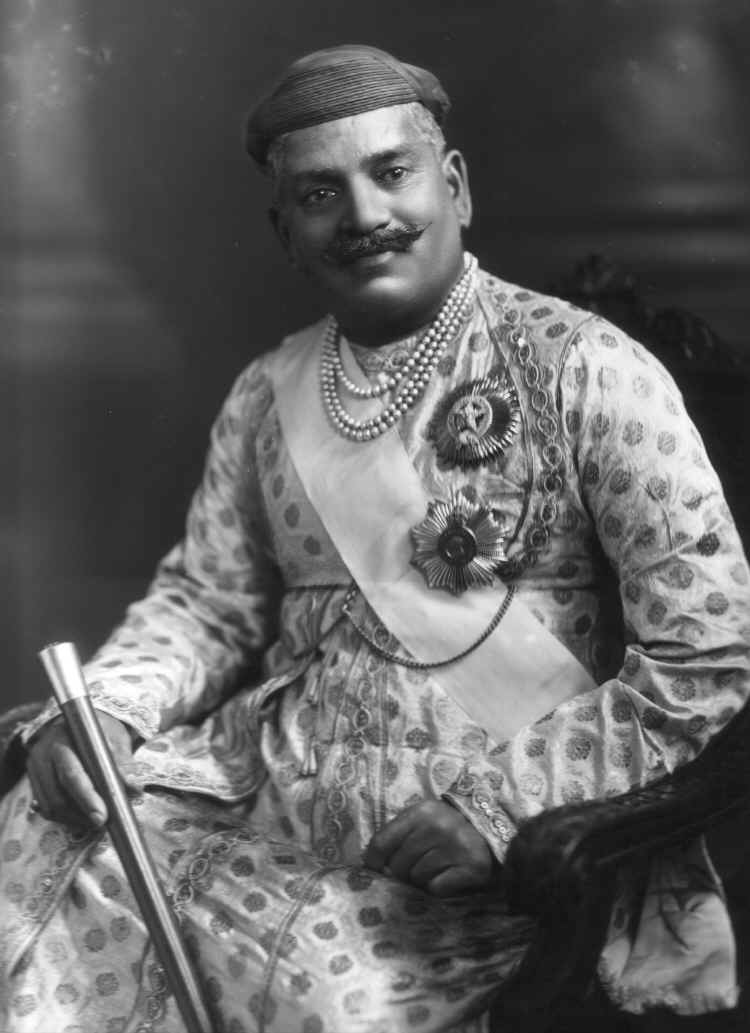
The Maratha Maharaja Sayajirao Gaekwad III of Baroda

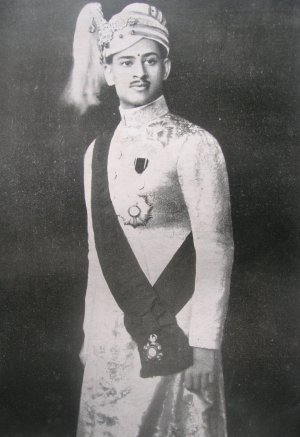
Chithira Thirunal Balarama Varma, the Maharaja of Travancore

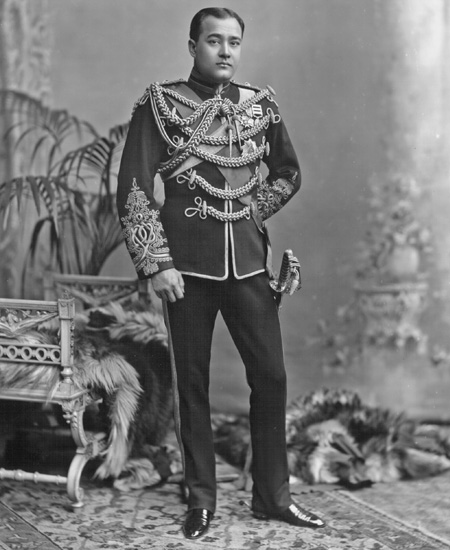
Maharaja Nripendra Narayan of Cooch Behar

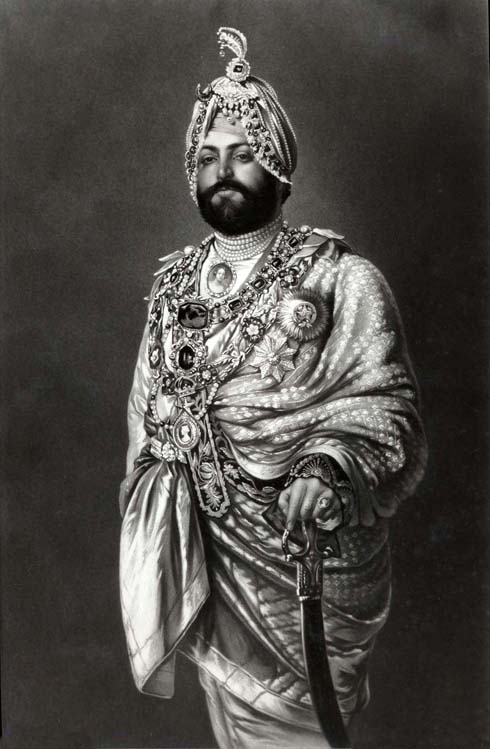
Maharaja Duleep Singh, the last Maharaja of the Sikh Empire

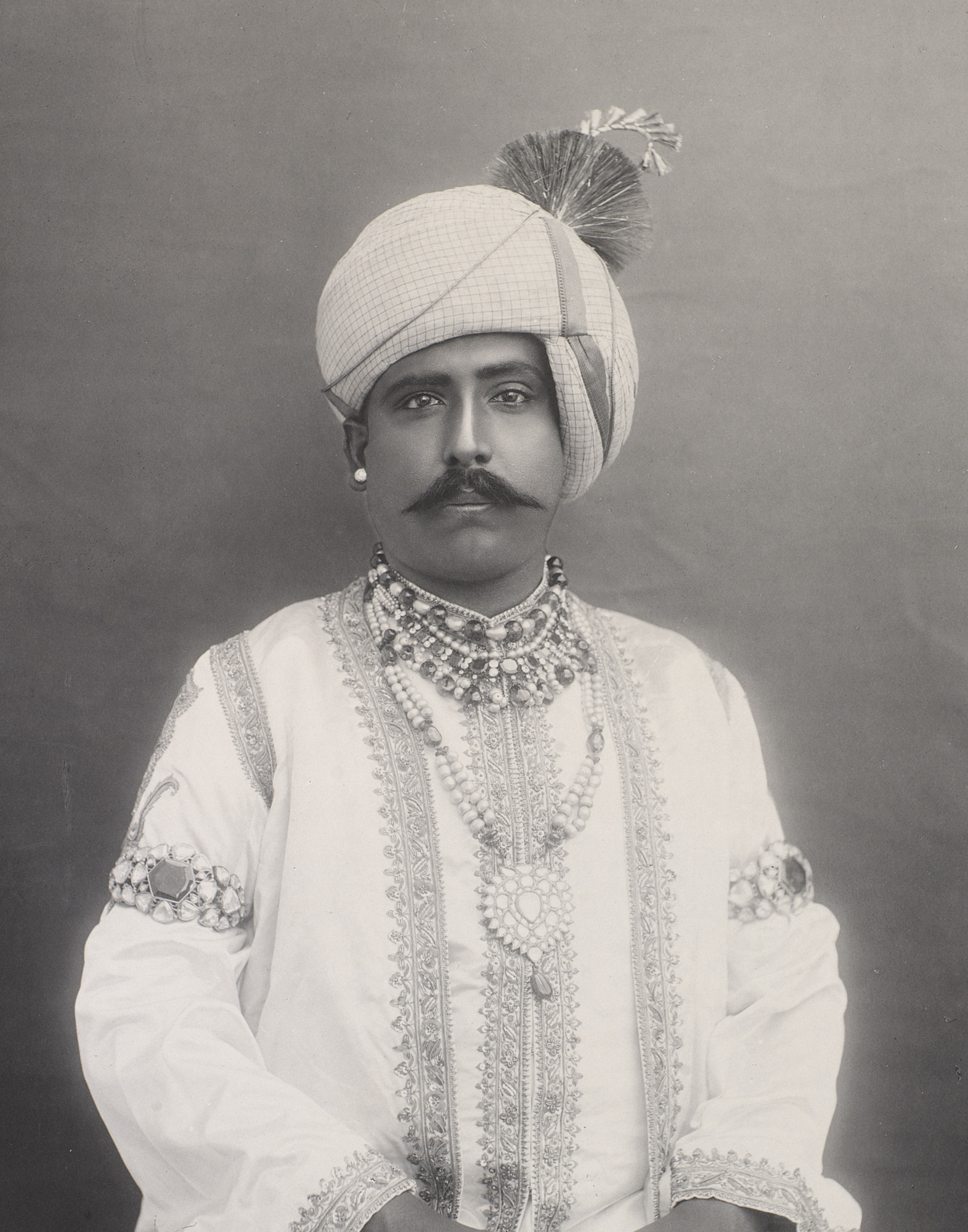
Maharaja Vikram Dev III of Jeypore Samasthanam Estate, Kalinga

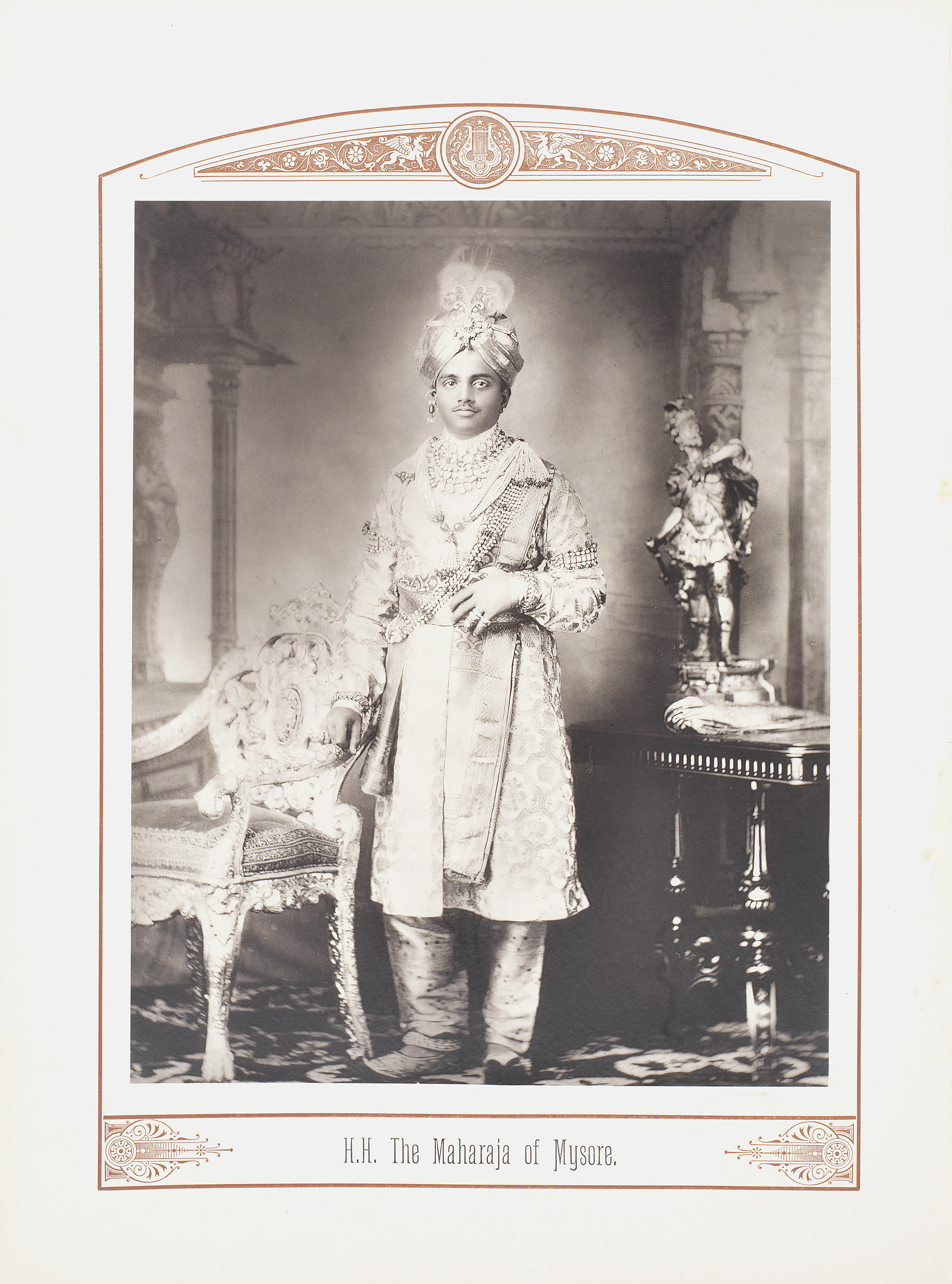
Krishnaraja Wadiyar IV, the Maharaja of Mysore

On the eve of independence in 1947, the Indian Empire contained more than 600 princely states, each with its own native ruler, often styled Raja or Rana or Thakur (if the ruler were Hindu) or Nawab (if he were Muslim), with a host of less current titles as well.

The British directly ruled two-thirds of the Indian subcontinent; the rest was under indirect rule by the above-mentioned princes under the considerable influence of British representatives, such as Residents, at their courts.

The word Maharaja may be understood simply to mean "ruler" or "king", in spite of its literal translation as "great king". This was because only a handful of the states were truly powerful and wealthy enough for their rulers to be considered 'great' monarchs; the remaining were minor princely states, sometimes little more than towns or groups of villages. The word, however, can also mean emperor in contemporary Indian usage.

The title of Maharaja was not as common before the gradual British colonisation of India, upon and after which many rajas and otherwise styled Hindu rulers were elevated to Maharajas, regardless of the fact that scores of these new Maharajas ruled small states, sometimes for some reason unrelated to the eminence of the state, for example, support to the British in Afghanistan, World War I or World War II. The Maharaja of Punjab in the 19th century was Maharaja Ranjit Singh. He earned this title by keeping the Britishers beyond the Sutlej and even crushed the Afghan Empire. Maharajas in the twentieth century were the Maharaja of Cochin and Maharaja Jagatjit Singh of Kapurthala. Apart from princely states, rulers of some large and extended zamindaris were also awarded the title of Maharaja. The rulers of Jeypore, Darbhanga, Vizianagaram, Parlakhemundi and Gidhaur were a few zamindars who were titled Maharaja for their cordiality and contribution to the British Raj.

- Variations of this title include the following, each combining Maha- "great" with an alternative form of Raja 'king', thus all meaning 'Great King': Maharana (as in Udaipur), Maharaj Rana (as in Jhalawar), Maharawal (as in Dungarpur/Jaisalmer), Maharawat (Pratapgarh), Maharao (as in Kotah, Bundi) and Maharaol (as in Baria).
- Maharajah has taken on new spellings due to the time change and migration. It has even been shortened to Mahraj and Maraj but the most common is Maharajah and Maharaj.
- The titles Maharaja ("great king"), Rajadhiraja ("king of kings"), and Maharajadhiraja ("great king of kings"), which were grand titles in ancient India, were devaluated in the course of time. Instead, the Indian title nearest to Emperor is Samrat or Samraj(a), which was popular in the Vedic period. Muslim equivalent of emperor would be Padshah (of Persian origin), notably applied to the Mughal dynasty, the paramount power until the British established their raj.

=== Compound and dynastic ruler titles ===
- Dharma-maharaja was the devout title (compare Rajadharma) of the rulers of the Ganga dynasty.

In the Mughal Empire it was quite common to award to various princes (hereditary or not) a series of lofty titles as a matter of protocolary rank. The British would, as paramount power do the same. Many of these (see also above) elaborate explicitly on the title Maharaja, in the following descending order:

- Maharajadhiraja Bahadur (or Maharajadhiraj Bahadur): a title of honour, one degree higher than Maharajadhiraja.
- Maharajadhiraja (or Maharajadhiraj): one degree higher than Sawai Maharaja Bahadur.
- Sawai Maharaja Bahadur: a title of honour, one degree higher than Sawai Maharaja. (the term bahadur, originally 'brave' in Persian, was often used for 'one-degree' higher', and 'sawai' is 'one and a quarter higher', i.e. just a step above bahadur)
- Sawai Maharaja: a title of honour one degree higher than Maharaja Bahadur; as granted (directly) to the Rajas of Ajaygarh.
- Maharaja Bahadur: a title of honour, one degree higher than Maharaja.

Furthermore, there were various compound titles simply including other princely styles, such as:

- Maharaja Chatrapati in Satara, the paramount state of the Maratha Confederacy
- H.H. the Maharaj Rana of Jhalawar
- Maharaja-i-Rajgan: great prince amongst princes
- Maharaja Sena Sahib Subah of Nagpur, another Maratha state
- Maharaj Babu: A Rajput title similar to Maharaja. Used by the ruling Chiefs of Hazari Estate, Dohazari of South Chittagong.
- For details concerning various titles containing sahib, see there

Certain Hindu dynasties even came to use a unique style, including a term which as such is not of princely rank, e.g. Maharaja Gaikwar of Baroda, Maharaja Shinde (or later anglicised: Scindia) of Gwalior, Maharaja Holkar of Indore, three of the very highest ranking ruling Maratha houses.

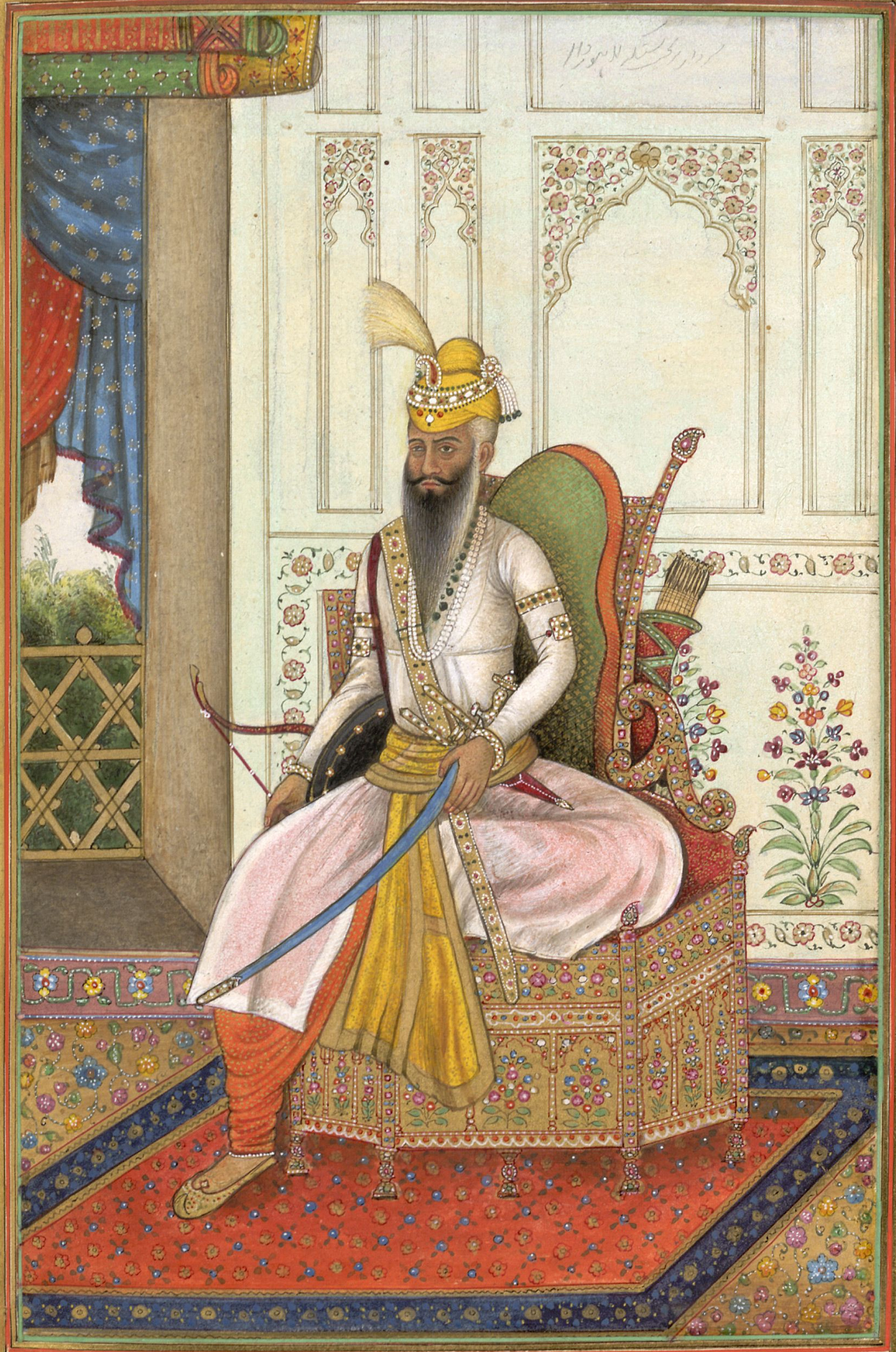
Ranjit Singh, first Maharaja of the Sikh Empire

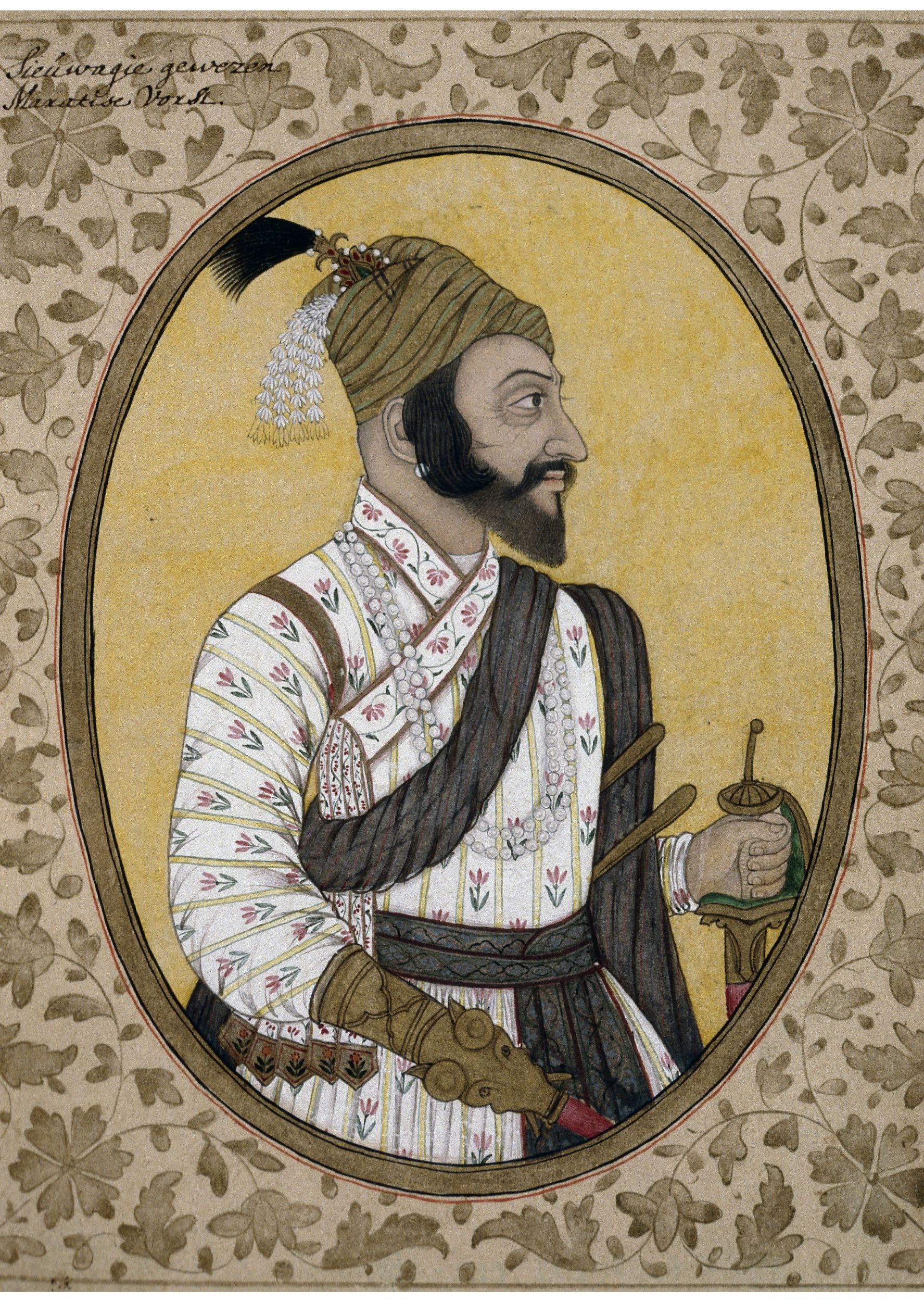
Chhatrapati Shivaji Bhosale. The Maratha ruler preferred the title of Chhatrapati over Maharaja, and was the founder and sovereign of the Maratha Empire in modern-day India.

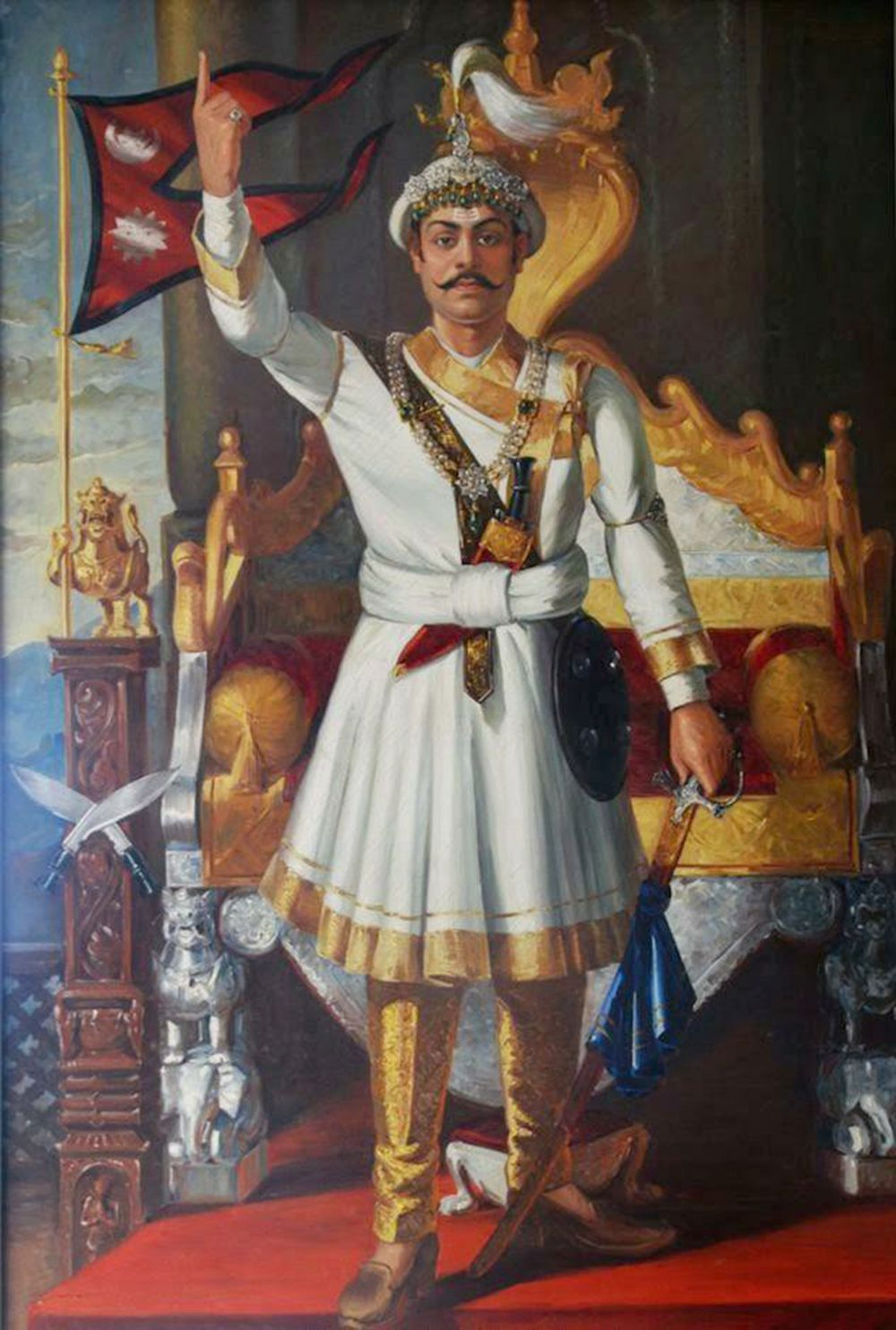
Shree Panch Bada Mahārājādhirāja Prithvi Narayan Shah Dev of Gorkha Kingdom and Kingdom of Nepal

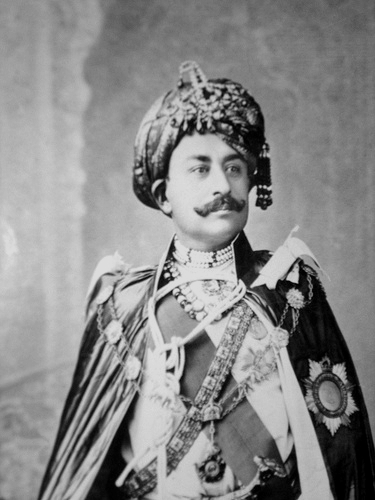
His Highness Maharajadhiraj Mirza Maharao Shri Sir Khengarji III Sawai Bahadur, Rao of Kutch, GCIE, KIH

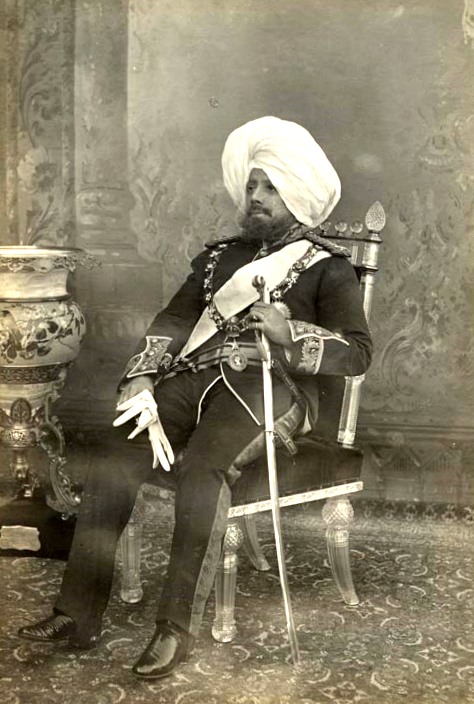
Maharaja Sir Pratap Singh of Jammu and Kashmir

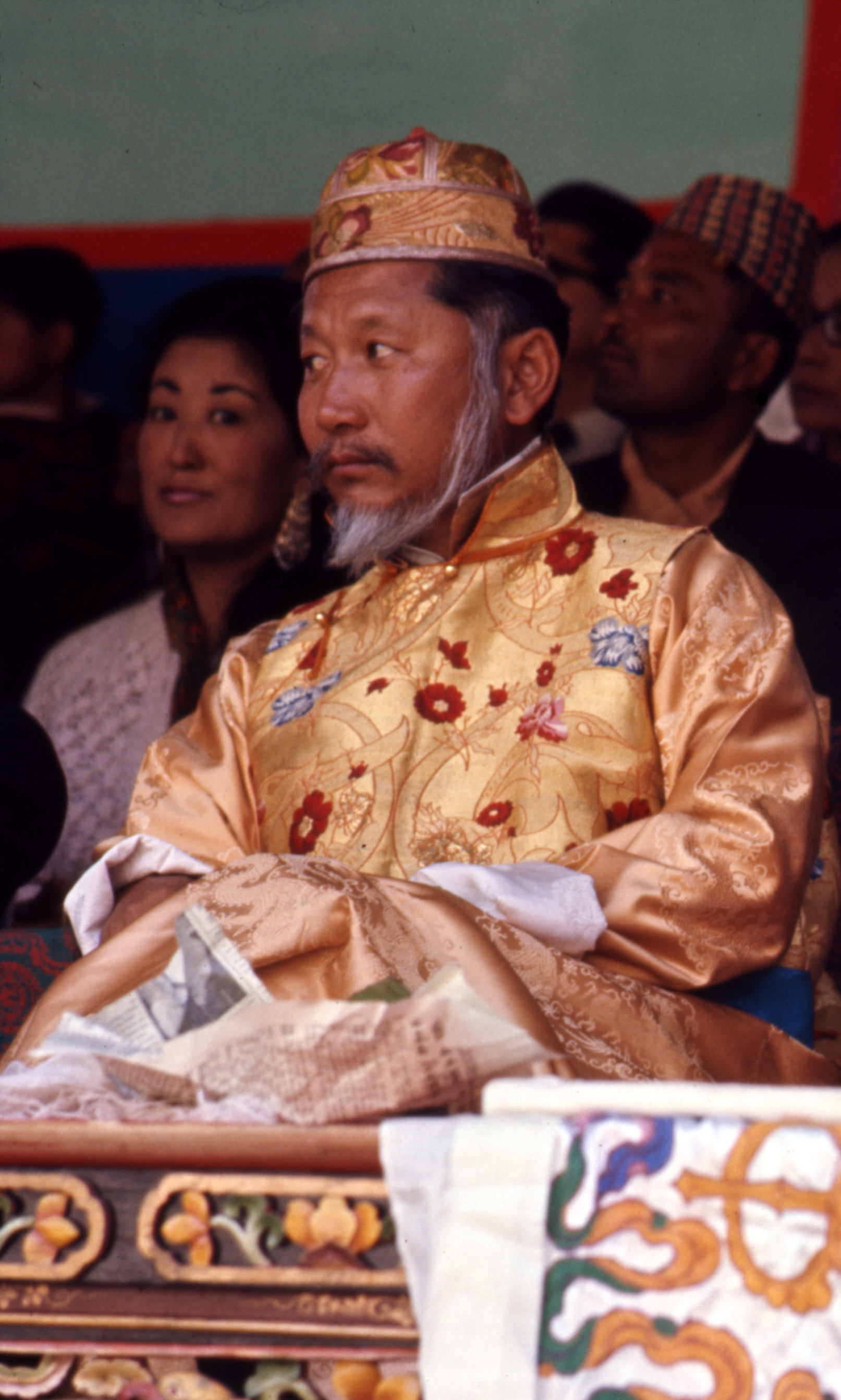
Maharaja Chogyal Palden Thondup Namgyal of Sikkim

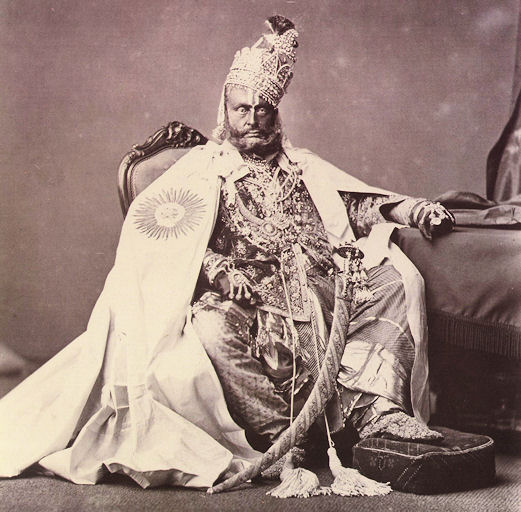
HH Samrajya Maharajadhiraja Bandhresh Shri Maharaja Raghuraj Singh Ju Deo Bahadur of Rewa in 1877, GCSI

=== Chakravarti ===
Chakravarti is a Sanskrit term for "emperor". The meaning of chakravarti is "he, whose wheels (of chariot) are moving" which symbolises that the leader who is a war hero, who commands over vast land and sea, the one who rules the people with dedication. In the Mahabharata, the Chakravarti Bharat is known to have ruled the entire sub-continent of India brought golden age to his empire. He is called as chakravarti. The wife of a Chakravartin or a female Chakravartin is called a Chakaravartini.

=== Maharani ===
Maharani usually denotes the wife of a Maharaja (or Maharana, Maharao, Maharawal) or in rare cases, in some states where it was customary, a woman ruling without a husband.

=== Rajkumara ===
Rajkumara is the son of a king who is not the heir apparent. He is conferred with certain duties or powers per the king's wishes. The daughter of a king who is not the heir apparent is called Rajakumari.

=== Rajamata ===
In cases where a child king is crowned, the mother of the king takes charge of the kingdom and acts as a regent. Until the young king is of the age, the Rajmata (Queen mother) administers the kingdom. Famous examples include Rajamata Shetu Lakshmi Bai of Travancore dynasty, Gowri Lakshmi Bai, Maharaji (later Rajamata) Rudrama Devi of Kakatiya dynasty. When the king is present, the Rajamata being the mother of the king, might be given ceremonial roles. A famous Rajamata who functioned with the king is Rajamata Jijabai of the Maratha Kingdom, accompanying the Chhatrapati (king).

=== Yuvaraja ===
Yuvaraja means the crown prince of the kingdom or empire. He is granted with certain powers and responsibilities so that he can be prepared to take over as the Maharaja. His wife is called Yuvarani.

=== Noble and honorary use ===
Like Raja and various other titles, Maharaja was repeatedly awarded to notables without a princely state, such as zamindars.

- One Raja of Lambagraon, a Jagir (in Himachal Pradesh) who served in the colonial army, was granted personally the non-hereditary title of Maharaja of Kangra-Lambagraon and a personal 11-gun salute, so neither honour passed on to his son and heir.
- In the major, Muslim realm of Hyderabad and Berar, there was a system of ennobling titles for the Nizam's courtiers, conferring a specific rank without any (e)state of their own, not unlike peerage titles without an actual fief in the UK, the highest titles for Hindu nobles being Maharaja Bahadur and Maharaja, above Vant, Raja Rai-i-Rayan Bahadur, Raja Rai Bahadur, Raja Bahadur, Raja and Rai; for their Muslim counterparts there were alternative titles, the highest being Jah and Umara; e.g. the Diwan (Prime Minister) Maharaja Sir Kishen Pershad, held such a Maharaja-title.

=== Derived style for princes of the blood ===
Maharaj Kumar (or Maharajkumar) means son of a Maharaja or Heir-Apparent; the female equivalent is Maharaj Kumari (Maharajkumari): daughter of a Maharaja.

=== Kingdom of Nepal ===
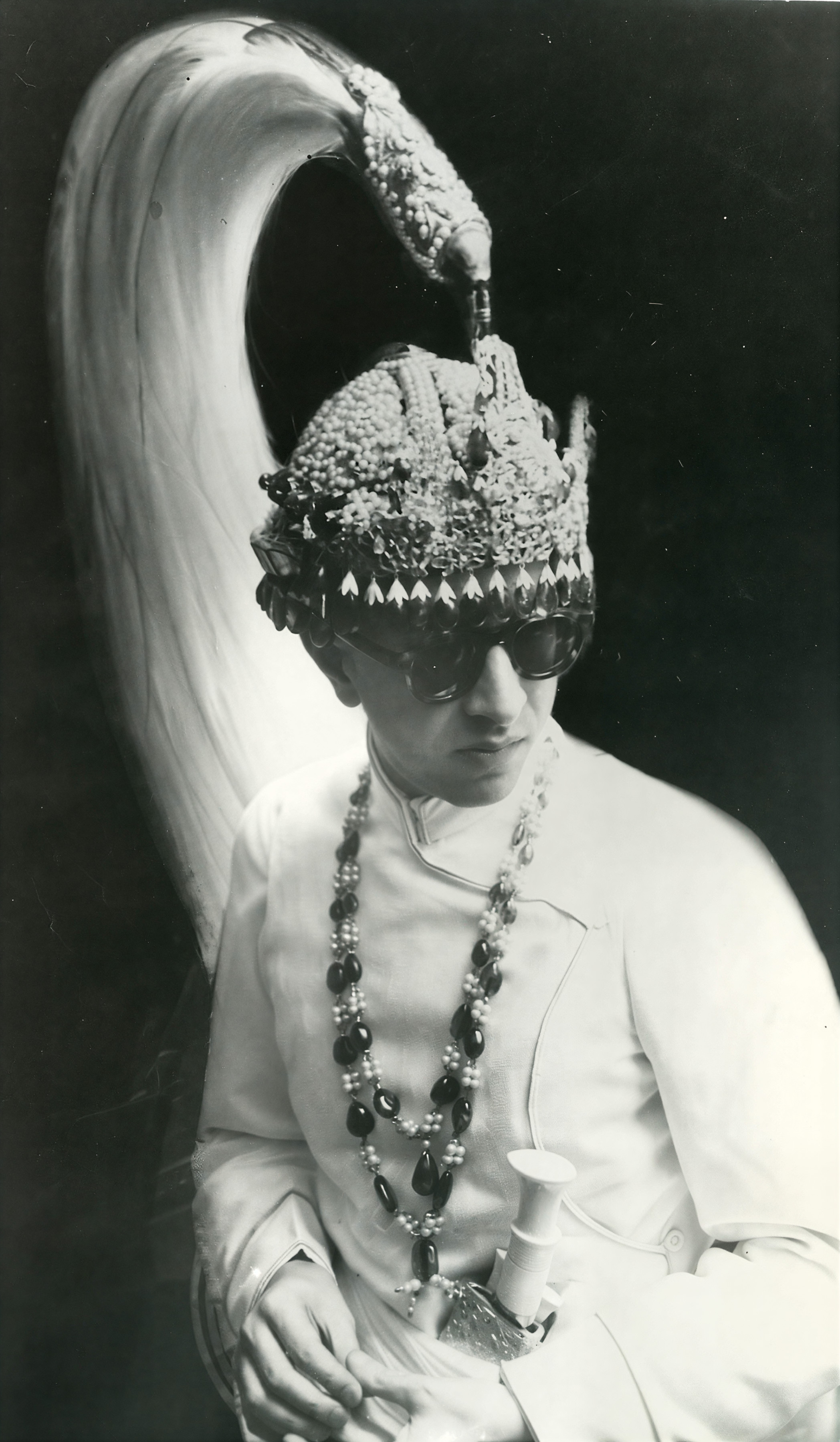
Shree Panch Mahārājādhirāja Mahendra Bir Bikram Shah Dev of Kingdom of Nepal

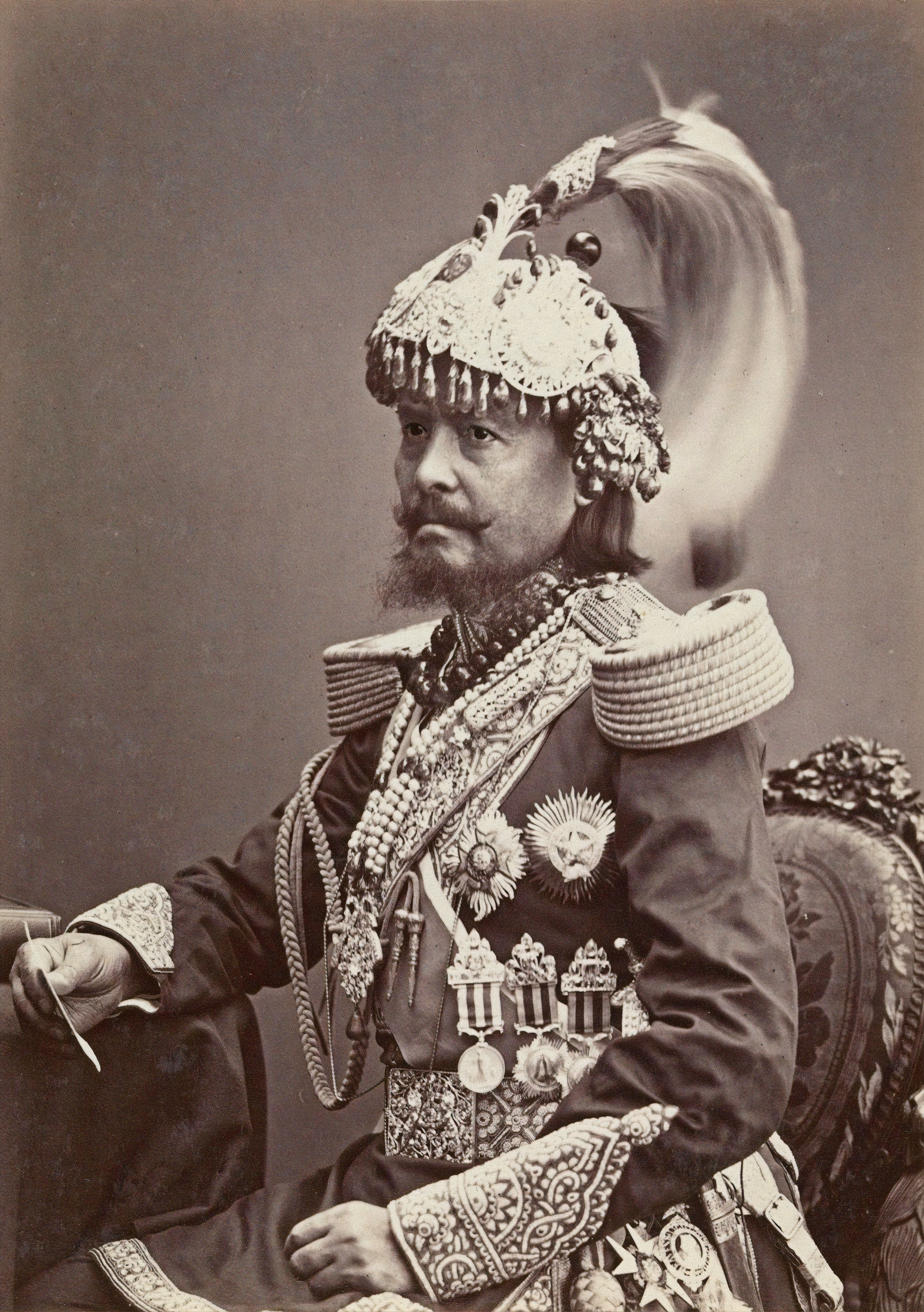
Shree Teen Mahārāja Jung Bahadur Rana of Kingdom of Nepal

The kings of Nepal used the title of Mahārājādhirāja, meaning "King of Great Kings", a honorific title, regarded as superior to Mahārāja. The Kings of Nepal used the title Shree Panch (Shree Shree Shree Shree Shree) Mahārājādhirāja, while the Rana Prime Ministers of Nepal used the title Shree Teen (Shree Shree Shree) Mahārāja.

== Southeast Asia ==
=== Brunei ===
In Seri Malayas of the Srivijaya, under the Srivijaya satellite empire of the Majapahit Empire dominated over the whole Malayas far-reaching the present Philippine Archipelago, Malaysia, Brunei, Indonesia under the Srivijaya Empire of the Majapahit King Maharaja Pamariwasa. The latter's daughter Es-kander was married to an Arab (Zein Ul-Abidin), the third Makdum who promulgated Koranic studies (Madrassahs) and was a Srivijaya ruler in Seri who were a Srivijaya Monarchy. In the 12th century with the fall of the empire, the Seri King being a Muslim established the Sultanate of Brunei in 1363 with the throne name Sultan Mohamad Shah. In 1426, he established the sultanate of sulu as his death was recorded in 1431 Mt. Makatangis Sulu grave and 1432 Brunei grave. Both Sulu and Brunei claim the honor of his grave, while his brother, a Johore (Singapore) Prince Makdum Karim (Sharif Kabungsuwan of Malabang Lanao) the second Makdum after the first one Makdum Tuan Masha'ik. Karim ul-makdum re=enforced Islam, a Srivijaya Johore ruler, later established the Sultanate of Maguindanao-Ranao (Mindanao) after taking the political authority of his father-in-law Tomaoi Aliwya of the Maguiindanao family dynasty. He adapted the title as sultan Aliwya (Sharif Kabungsuwan), the first Maguindanao Sultan. The second and third Makdum's father was Sultan Betatar of Taif Arabia who was the 9th progeny of Hasan, the grandson of prophet Sayyidina Muhammad.

=== Dali ===
Duan Xingzhi, the last monarch of the Kingdom of Dali, submitted to the Mongol Empire, and in return was enfeoffed as Maharaja (摩诃罗嵯) of Dali, continuing to rule the area (but subordinated to Yuan princes and Muslim governors of Yunnan), until the Ming conquest of Yunnan.

=== Indonesia ===
When the Indonesian Archipelago was still predominantly Hindu-Buddhist (c. 3rd century CE until the 15th century CE), all of the Indianised kingdoms which ruled different areas of the archipelago was ruled by a "Maharaja" or simply referred by the locals as "Raja", such as the first and oldest Hindu kingdom of Indonesia the Kutai Martadipura in eastern Borneo, the Tarumanegara, the Srivijaya, the Majapahit and numerous other kingdoms. Traditional titles remain in use for other members of royalty, such as Pangeran Ratu for the heir and other local-Malay titles such as "Paduka Sri". The title "Maharaja" has been used to refer to kings of ancient Indianised kingdoms, such as Maharaja Mulavarman king of Kutai Martadipura and Maharaja Purnawarman king of Tarumanegara.

Maharaja was also part of the titles of the nobility in the Sumatran sultanate of Aceh. In the past, the title of Maharaja is given to a leader of the unreigning noble family and the Prime Minister Maharaja Mangkubumi. The last Prime Minister of Aceh who was installed to be the Maharaja Mangkubumi, Habib Abdurrahman el Zahir, who also acted as the foreign affairs minister of Aceh but was deposed and exiled to Jeddah by the colonial Dutch East Indies authorities in October 1878.

=== Malaysia ===
In peninsular Malaysia:

- Maharaja was the title of the monarch of the peninsular Malay state of Johor(e) from 1873 to 1885. The Arabic, Muslim title Sultan, often considered of higher rank, was re-adopted later and remains in current usage.
- The title Bendahara Seri Maharaja was used by the ruler of Pahang (1623–1853 in personal union with Johor, eventually becoming a fief of the Bendahara family), till on 6 August 1882 Tuanku Ahmad al-Muadzam Shah ibni al-Marhum Tun Ali adopted the title, Sultan.

In northern Borneo, the title Maharajah of Sabah and Rajah of Gaya and Sandakan was used from 29 December 1877 to 26 August 1881 by Baron von Overbeck (compare White Rajah).

The Englishman Capt. James Brooke was declared as Rajah Brooke by the Sultan of Brunei for his role in pacifying the Sarawak revolt against the Sultan during the Raffles' stint. The word Rajah derived from the word Maharaja. In 1842, the Sultan of Brunei ceded Sarawak to Rajah Brooke who founded the Kingdom of Sarawak and a line of dynastic monarchs known as the White Rajahs.

In contemporary Malay usage, the title Maharaja refers to an emperor, e.g. "Maharaja Jepun" ("Emperor of Japan") while the title Maharani refers to an empress.

==== Compound Malay titles ====
The word can also be part of titles used by Malay nobility:

- Maharaja Lela was the title of the ruler of the State of Naning (founded 1641), until it was annexed by the United Kingdom to Malacca in 1832.

Most famous was Bendahara Seri Maharaja Tun Mutahir of Malacca (executed 1509) and Datuk Maharaja Lela Pandak Lam of Perak (executed 1876).

The palace marshal of the Yang di-Pertuan Agong (head of state) of modern Malaysia is called Datuk Maharaja Lela Penghulu Istana Negara.

Eventually, Maharajah Adinda was also used to refer to a particular lineage within the royal families.

=== Thailand ===
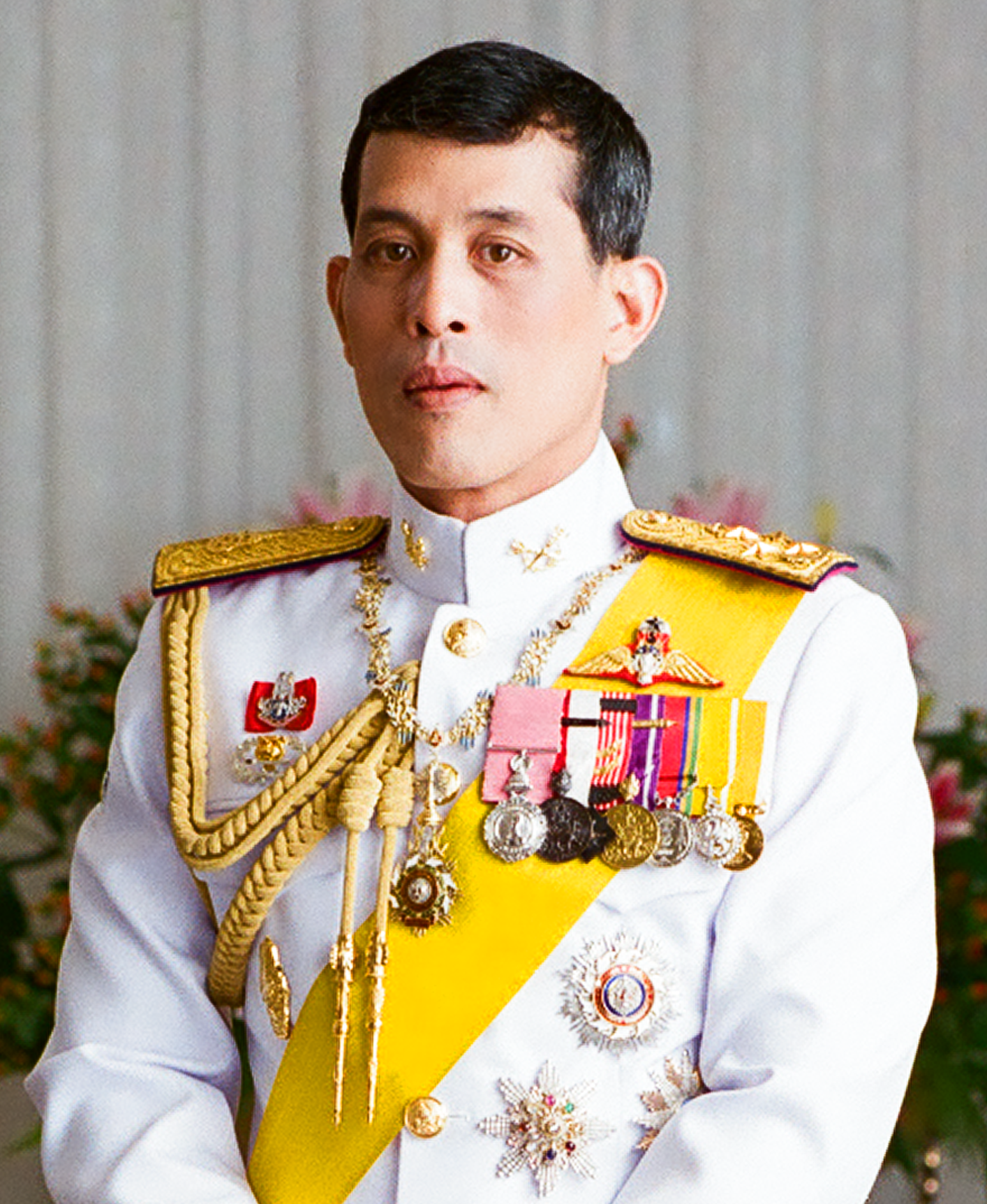
Maha Vajiralongkorn Bodindradebayavarangkun, king of Thailand (2016–)

The king of Thailand has been called a "Maharaj" (Thai: มหาราชา).

== See also ==
- Maha Raja Rajya Shri
- Maharajah and the Sepoys
- Uparaja
