= Shree Panch =

Former royal honorific used in Nepal

Shree Panch (Nepali: श्री ५) was a royal honorific used for monarchs of Nepal during the Shah dynasty. It was equivalent to "His Majesty" in English and appeared at the beginning of the monarch’s full regnal name. The use of this title ended in 2008 with Nepal abolishing its monarchy and transitioning to a federal democratic republic.

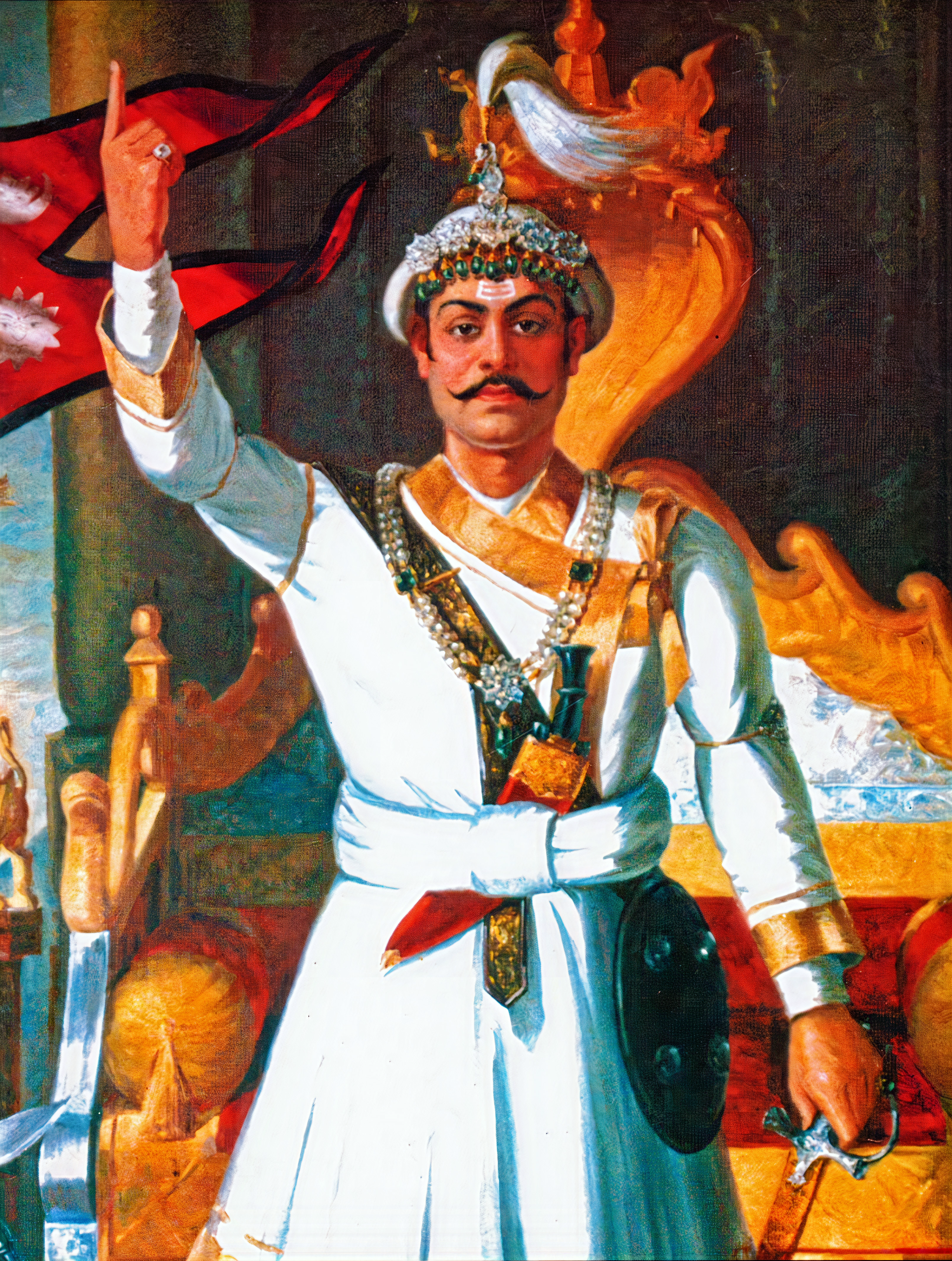
Prithvi Narayan Shah of the Gorkha kingdom, under whom the Shree Panch honorific came into usage.

== List of Shree Panch Kings of the Shah Dynasty (Nepal) ==
- Prithvi Narayan Shah
- Pratap Singh Shah
- Rana Bahadur Shah
- Girvan Yuddha Bikram Shah
- Rajendra Bikram Shah
- Surendra Bikram Shah
- Prithvi Bir Bikram Shah
- Tribhuvan Bir Bikram Shah
- Mahendra Bir Bikram Shah
- Birendra Bir Bikram Shah
- Dipendra Bir Bikram Shah
- Gyanendra Bir Bikram Shah

== Linguistic Origin ==
The term consists of two Sanskrit words: Shree (श्री), commonly used as an honorific, and Panch (पञ्च), meaning "five". The combined term "Shree Panch" was used as a royal designation for the king. It was not applied to other members of the royal family or government officials.

== Use in Royal Titles ==
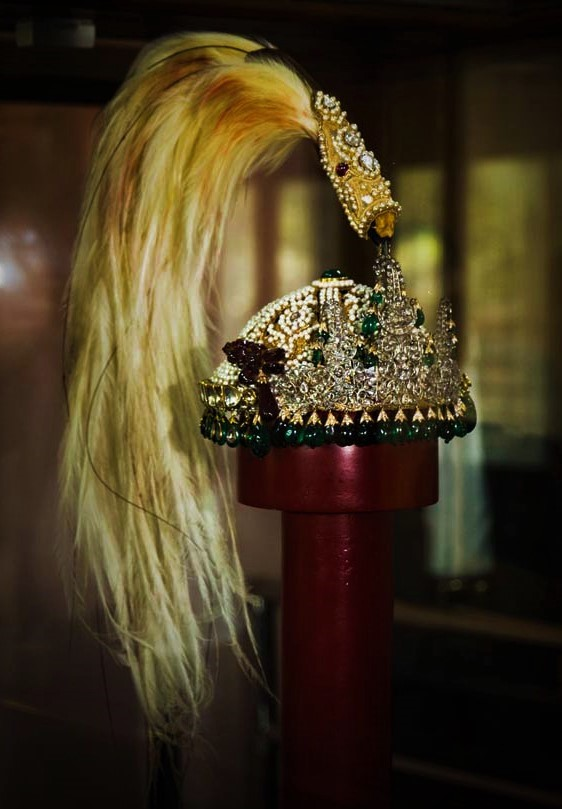
The royal crown of Nepal, known as Shreepech, traditionally worn by Shah dynasty kings.

The honorific "Shree Panch" appeared in the formal titles of kings of Nepal, such as Shree Panch Maharajadhiraj Birendra Bir Bikram Shah Dev. It was used in state documents, official communications, and references to the monarch during the Shah dynasty.

== Historical Development ==
The use of the title "Shree Panch" began during the reign of King Prithvi Narayan Shah in the 18th century and continued under later rulers of the Shah dynasty, including Kings Tribhuvan, Mahendra, Birendra, and Gyanendra.

After the monarchy was abolished in 2008 and Nepal was declared a republic, the title was no longer used in official state contexts. While its formal use ended, it occasionally appeared in informal or ceremonial references in certain circles.

== Discontinuation in 2025 ==
In July 2025, the secretariat of former King Gyanendra Shah announced that it would no longer use the title "Shree Panch" in official statements and documents. This decision followed criticism from members of parliament and civil society, who argued that the continued use of monarchical titles was not aligned with the constitutional framework of the republic.

However, the decision was changed back, and the title "Shree Panch" was officially used again by the Royal Family.

== See also ==
- Maharajadhiraj
- Shree Teen
- Monarchy of Nepal
- Gyanendra of Nepal
- Shah dynasty
