= Satterjhora =

Satterjhora सत्तेरझोरा
- Village Development Committee
- Location in Nepal Satterjhora (Nepal)
- Coordinates: 26.5416666667°N 87.1875°E
- Country: Nepal
- Province: Province No. 1
- District: Sunsari District

Population (2011)
  - Total: 9,507
- Time zone: UTC+5:45 (Nepal Time)

Satterjhora (Nepali: सत्तेरझोरा गाबिस) is a village development committee in Sunsari District in Province No. 1 of south-east Nepal. Its population (2011) was 9,507 in 1,889 households. Among them the male and female population was about 4,539 and 4,968 respectively.

This VDC is a combination of nine villages known as wards. The main villages of Satterjhora are Hattimuda, Bhawanipur, Majhou, Thalaha, Holaiya, etc. Some community schools are Janata Madhyamika Vidhyalaya, Bhawani Prathamika Vidhyalaya, etc. and some private schools are Rising Public Academy, Pashupati Academy, etc.
Though the village is well connected by road, electricity but development of infrastructure is not rapid as expected.
A road construction programme is on process. According to the committee members, the construction program will be completed by 2018/2019. This road links District Development Committee in Inaruwa Municipality and Village Development Committee in Satterjhora VDC. Currently, it is almost completed half.

== VDCs and Municipalities Of Sunsari District ==
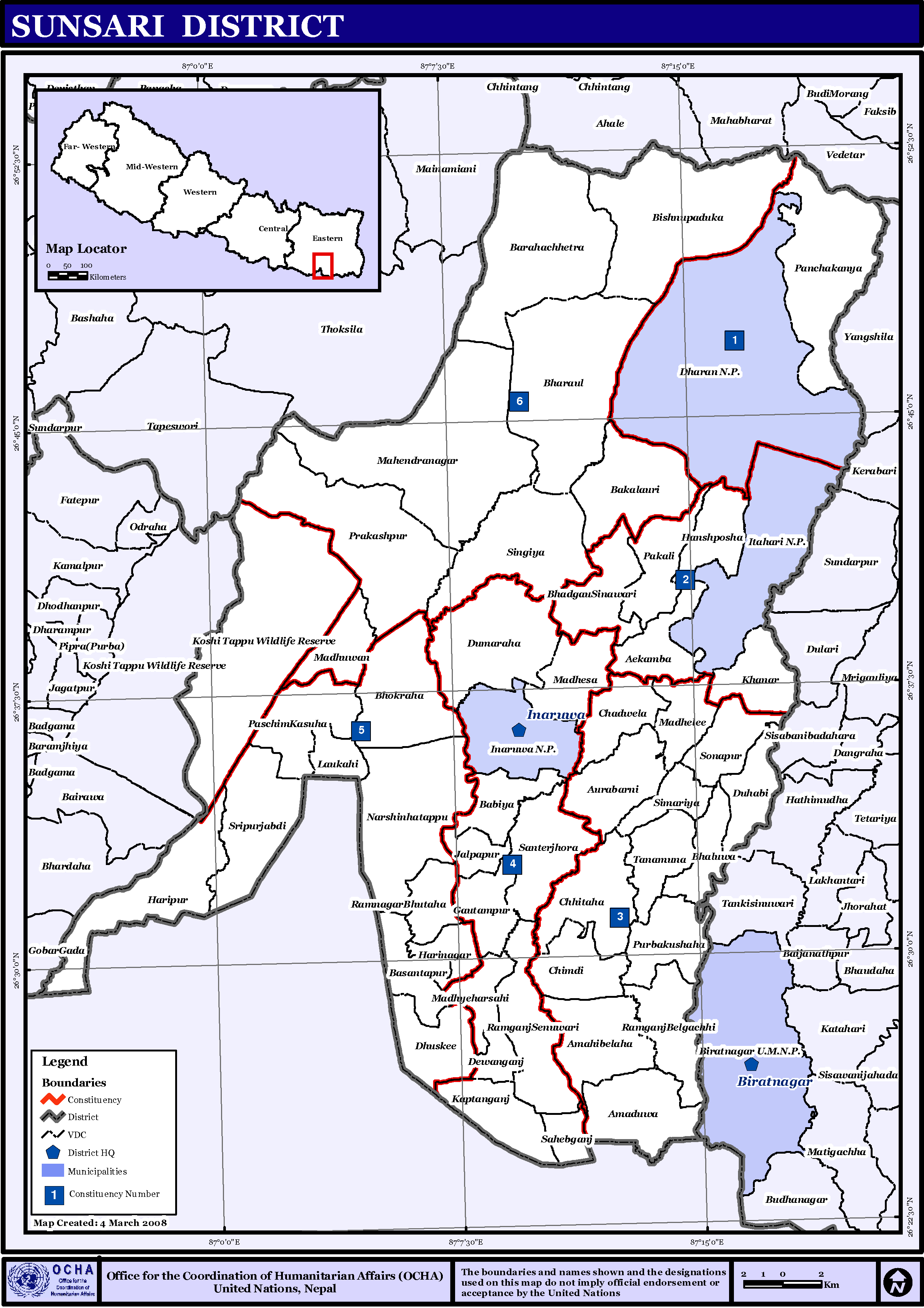
Map of the VDCs in Sunsari District

- Amaduwa
- Amahibelaha
- Aurabarni
- Bakalauri
- Barahachhetra
- Basantapur
- Bhaluwa
- Bharaul
- Bhokraha
- Bishnupaduka
- Chadwela
- Chhitaha
- Chimdi
- Dewanganj
- Dharan Sub-metropolitan Municipality
- Duhabi-Bhaluwa Municipality
- Dumaraha
- Gautampur
- Ghuski
- Harinagar
- Haripur
- Inaruwa Municipality
- Itahari Municipality
- Jalpapur
- Kaptanganj
- Laukahi
- Madheli
- Madhesa
- Madhuwan
- Madhyeharsahi
- Mahendranagar
- Narshinhatappu
- Panchakanya
- Paschim Kasuha
- Prakashpur
- Purbakushaha
- Ramdhuni-Bhasi Municipality
- Ramganj Belgachhi
- Ramganj Senuwari
- Ramnagar Bhutaha
- Sahebganj
- Satterjhora
- Simariya
- Singiya
- Sonapur
- Sripurjabdi
- Tanamuna

== Schools ==
- Shree Janata Madhyamika Vidhyalaya, Hattimuda
- Shree Bhawani Prathamika Vidhyalaya, Bhawanipur
- Rising Public Academy, Hattimuda
- Pashupati Academy, Hattimuda

== Health ==
Satterjhora Health Post is a Government Body charge with providing health service.

== Governance ==
Satterjhora is controlled by the Nepalese Government.
