= Sunsari 2 =

Parliamentary constituency in Province No. 1, Nepal

- Parliamentary constituency
- Sunsari 2 in Province No. 1
- Province: Province No. 1
- District: Sunsari District

Current constituency
- Created: 1991
- Seats: 1
- Party: Rastriya Swatantra Party
- Member of Parliament: Lal Bikram Thapa
- Member of the Provincial Assembly: Rewati Raman Bhandari, (CPN (UML))
- Member of the Provincial Assembly: Ram prasad Mahato, ([[Communist Party of Nepal (Unified Marxist–Leninist)|CPN(UML))

Sunsari 2 is one of four parliamentary constituencies of Sunsari District in Nepal. This constituency came into existence on the Constituency Delimitation Commission (CDC) report submitted on 31 August 2017.

== Incorporated areas ==
Sunsari 2 incorporates Dewangunj Rural Municipality, ward 3 of Harinagara Rural Municipality, wards 1–3, 5, 8 and 9 of Ramdhuni Municipality, wards 1, 2, 5, 6, 9 and 10 of Inaruwa Municipality and wards 1–5 and 16–20 of Itahari Sub-metropolitan City.

== Assembly segments ==
It encompasses the following Province No. 1 Provincial Assembly segment

- Sunsari 2(A)
- Sunsari 2(B)

== Members of Parliament ==
=== Parliament/Constituent Assembly ===
Election	Member	Party
1991	Bijay Kumar Gachhadar	Nepali Congress
2008	Dharma Raj Niraula	CPN (Unified Marxist–Leninist)
2013	Rewati Raman Bhandari	CPN (Unified Marxist–Leninist)
2017	Sitaram Mahato	Nepali Congress
2022	Bhim Acharya	Communist Party of Nepal (Unified Marxist–Leninist)
2026	Lal Bikram Thapa	Rastriya Swatantra Party

=== Provincial Assembly ===
==== 2(A) ====
Election	Member	Party
2017	Rewati Raman Bhandari	CPN (Unified Marxist-Leninist)
May 2018	Rewati Raman Bhandari	Nepal Communist Party

==== 2(B) ====
Election	Member	Party
2017	Rajeev Koirala	Nepali Congress

== Election results ==
=== Election in the 2020s ===
==== 2026 general election ====
Candidate	Party	Votes	%
Lal Bikram Thapa	Rastriya Swatantra Party	0	0.00
Rajiv Koirala	Nepali Congress	16,071	45.02
Sujan Lama	CPM (UML)	8,303	23.26
Chetan Rai	Shram Sanskriti Party	7,484	20.97
Ram Kumari Chaudhary	NCP	1,816	5.09
Dinesh Kumar Basnet	RPP	1,287	3.61
Gopal Tamang	UNP	734	2.06
Others		0	0.00
Total		35,695	100.00
Majority			
RSP gain			

==== 2022 general election ====
Candidate	Party	Votes	%
Bhim Acharya	CPN (UML)	32,024	36.16
Sitaram Mahato	Nepali Congress	26,068	29.44
Lal Bikram Thapa	Rastriya Swatantra Party	19,391	21.90
Dinesh Kumar Basnet	Rastriya Prajatantra Party	4,269	4.82
Ramnanda Mahato	Janamat Party	1,192	1.35
Deepak Raj Chaudhary	Nagrik Unmukti Party	1,162	1.31
Nunu Ram Chaudhary	Nepal Loktantrik Party	1,023	1.16
Others		3,423	3.87
Total		88,552	100.00
Majority		5,956	
CPN (UML) gain			

==== 2022 Nepalese provincial elections ====
===== 2(A) =====
Party	Candidate	Votes
CPN (Unified Marxist–Leninist)	Rewati Raman Bhandari	14537
CPN(Maoist Center)	Dwarik lal chaudhary	11852
Result	CPN (UML) won	
Source: Election Commission

===== 2(B) =====
Party	Candidate	Votes		
Nepali Congress	Rajeev koirala	17643		
CPN (Unified Marxist–Leninist)	Ram prasad Mahato	18209	Result	CPN UML won
Source: Election Commission

=== Election in the 2010s ===
==== 2017 legislative elections ====
Party	Candidate	Votes
Nepali Congress	Sitaram Mahato	41,495
CPN (Maoist Centre)	Damaru Subedi	35,349
Federal Socialist Forum, Nepal	Tej Narayan Chaudhary	4,834
Rastriya Janata Party Nepal	Munna Devi Mehta	1,674
Others		3,703
Invalid votes		4,705
Result	Congress gain	
Source: Election Commission

==== 2017 Nepalese provincial elections ====
===== 2(A) =====
Party	Candidate	Votes
CPN (Unified Marxist–Leninist)	Sarba Dhoj Sawa Limbu	24,674
Nepali Congress	Hem Karna Paduel	19,245
Others		2,569
Invalid votes		1,409
Result	CPN (UML) gain	
Source: Election Commission

===== 2(B) =====
Party	Candidate	Votes
Nepali Congress	Rajeev Koirala	17,892
CPN (Unified Marxist–Leninist)	Bhim Prasad Acharya	16,475
Federal Socialist Forum, Nepal	Narayan Yadav	3,579
CPN (Marxist–Leninist)	Shyam Dev Mehta	1,176
Rastriya Janata Party Nepal	Mahadev Mehta	1,066
Others		677
Invalid votes		3,049
Result	Congress gain	
Source: Election Commission

==== 2013 Constituent Assembly election ====
Party	Candidate	Votes
CPN (Unified Marxist–Leninist)	Rewati Raman Bhandari	18,474
Nepali Congress	Badri Narayan Chaudhary	11,443
Madheshi Janaadhikar Forum, Nepal (Democratic)	Narendra Kumar Chaudhary	7,468
UCPN (Maoist)	Ram Kumari Chaudhary	4,786
Rastriya Prajatantra Party Nepal	Prem Prasad Bhattarai	4,227
Federal Socialist Party, Nepal	Tek Kumar Ale	2,069
Rastriya Prajatantra Party	Suraj Kadel	1,511
Others		3,441
Result	CPN (UML) hold	
Source: NepalNews

=== Election in the 2000s ===
==== 2008 Constituent Assembly election ====
Party	Candidate	Votes
CPN (Unified Marxist–Leninist)	Dharma Raj Niraula	15,636
CPN (Maoist)	Kumar Phudung	12,805
Rastriya Prajatantra Party	Narendra Kumar Chaudhary	11,247
Nepali Congress	Ambar Bahadur Gauli	8,372
Madheshi Janaadhikar Forum, Nepal	Arjun Thapa	1,041
Others		2,645
Invalid votes		3,708
Result	CPN (UML) gain	
Source: Election Commission

=== Election in the 1990s ===
==== 1999 legislative elections ====
Party	Candidate	Votes
Nepali Congress	Bijay Kumar Gachhadar	27,527
CPN (Unified Marxist–Leninist)	Rewati Raman Bhandari	23,339
Rastriya Prajatantra Party	Rohit Bahadur Karki	3,639
Others		2,192
Invalid Votes		1,483
Result	Congress hold	
Source: Election Commission

==== 1994 legislative elections ====
Party	Candidate	Votes
Nepali Congress	Bijay Kumar Gachhadar	21,963
CPN (Unified Marxist–Leninist)	Kuldeep Peshkar	10,708
Rastriya Prajatantra Party	Tek Chandra Bishwakarma	9,509
Others		2,172
Result	Congress hold	
Source: Election Commission

==== 1991 legislative elections ====
Party	Candidate	Votes
Nepali Congress	Bijay Kumar Gachhadar	27,775
CPN (Unified Marxist–Leninist)	Lila Shrestha	15,885
Result	Congress gain	

== See also ==
- List of parliamentary constituencies of Nepal
