= Koshi Rural Municipality =

KOSHI कोशी गाउँपालिका
- Rural Municipality
- Location in Koshi Province KOSHI (Nepal)
- Coordinates: 26.6°N 87.06°E
- Province: Koshi Province
- District: Sunsari
- Wards: 8
- Established: 10 March 2017

Government
  - Type: Rural Council
  - Chairperson: Mr. AYUB ANSARI (NC)
  - Vice-chairperson: Mrs. ANITA DEVI YADAV (NC)

Area
  - Total: 75.98 km^{2} (29.34 sq mi)

Population (2011)
  - Total: 43,626
  - Density: 574.2/km^{2} (1,487/sq mi)
- Time zone: UTC+5:45 (Nepal Standard Time)
- Headquarter: Laukahi
- Website: official website

Koshi (Nepali: कोशी गाउँपालिका) is one of the six rural municipalities (gaunpalika) of Sunsari District in Koshi Province of Nepal. There are a total of 12 municipalities in Sunsari of which 6 are urban and 6 rural.

According to the Ministry of Federal Affairs and Local Developme Koshi has an area of 75.98 square kilometres (29.34 mi^{2}) and the total population of the municipality is 43626 as of Census of Nepal 2011.

Laukahi, Paschim Kasuha, Sripurjabdi and Haripur, which were previously separate village development committees, merged to form this new local level body. Fulfilling the requirement of the new Constitution of Nepal 2015, the Ministry of Federal Affairs and Local Development replaced all old VDCs and municipalities with 753 new local level body (Municipality).

The rural municipality is divided into 8 wards and the headquarter of this newly formed rural municipality is situated in Laukahi.
