= Barju Rural Municipality =

Rural municipality in Sunsari

Barju वर्जु गाउँपालिका
- Rural Municipality
- Motto: सुन्दर, शिक्षित, समृद्ध, सुशासन तथा प्रविधीयुक्त गाउँपालिका निर्माण, हाम्राे अभियान (Nepali: Beautiful, educated, Enriched, good governanced and methodical rural municipality is our campaign)
- Interactive map of Barju
- Location in Province No. 1 Barju (Nepal)
- Coordinates: 26.46°N 87.2°E
- Province: Province No. 1
- District: Sunsari
- Wards: 6
- Established: 10 March 2017

Government
  - Type: Rural Council
  - Chairperson: Mr. Anmol Roy(The Communist Party of Nepal (Unified Marxist–Leninist)
  - Vice-chairperson: Mrs. Cricket(The Communist Party of Nepal (Unified Marxist–Leninist)

Area
  - Total: 69.43 km^{2} (26.81 sq mi)

Population (2021)
  - Total: 36,533
  - Density: 526.2/km^{2} (1,363/sq mi)
- Time zone: UTC+5:45 (Nepal Standard Time)
- Website: official website

Barju (Nepali: बर्जु गाउँपालिका) is one of six rural municipalities (gaunpalika) located in Sunsari District of Province No. 1 of Nepal. There are a total of 12 municipalities in Sunsari, of which 6 are urban and 6 rural.

According to Ministry of Federal Affairs and Local Developme Barju has an area of 69.43 square kilometres (26.81 mi^{2}) and the total population of the municipality is 36,533 as of Census of Nepal 2021.

Ramganj Belgachhiya, Amaduwa, Amahibelaha and Chimdi which previously were all separate Village development committee merged to form this new local level body. Fulfilling the requirement of the new Constitution of Nepal 2015, Ministry of Federal Affairs and Local Development replaced all old VDCs and Municipalities into 753 new local level body (Municipality).

The rural municipality is divided into total 6 wards and the headquarter of this newly formed rural municipality is situated in Amahibelaha.
