= Prakashpur =

Prakashpur प्रकाशपुर
- Barahakshetra Municipality
- Location in Nepal
- Coordinates: 26.6881500°N 87.0997100°E
- Country: Nepal
- Zone: Koshi Zone
- District: Sunsari District

Government
  - Mayor: Mr. Ramesh Karki (Nepali Congress)
  - Deputy Mayor: Mrs. Nanda Kumari Rai (NCP)
  - Ward Chairperson: Mr. Tej Gurung (Nepali Congress)

Population (1991)
  - Total: 11,110
  - Ethnicities: Chhetri Madheshi Limbu Rai Bramhan Bishwakarma Magar Gurung Tamang Tharu Pariyar
- Time zone: UTC+5:45 (Nepal Time)

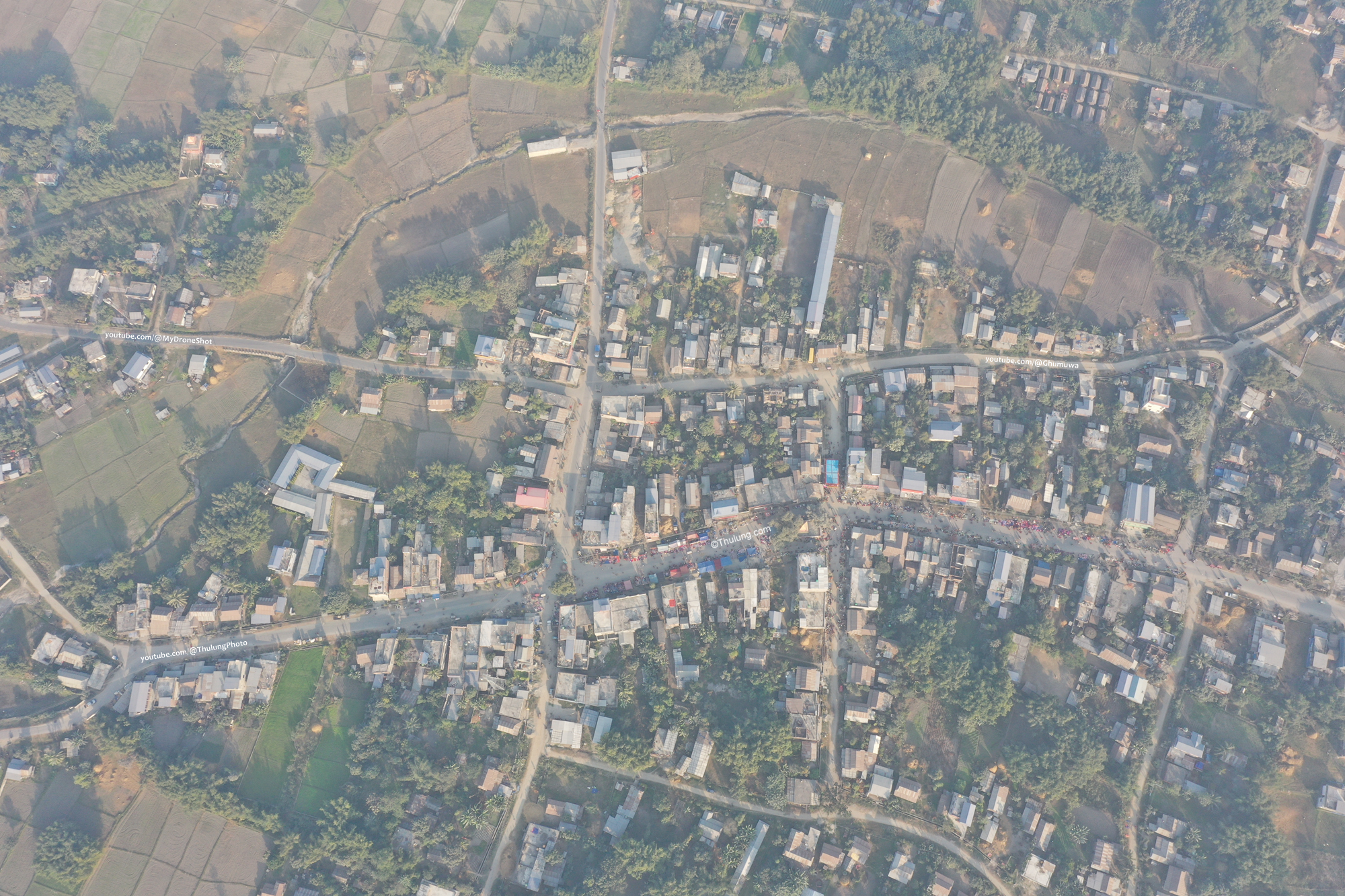
Prakashpur, Eastern Nepal

Prakashpur is a small town in Sunsari District in the Koshi Zone in southeastern Nepal. It lies in ward no.10 of Barahakshetra municipality. It is near the India-Nepal border. It is famous for its beautiful and peaceful environment. Most of the people come here to visit the Koshi, which is one of the longest rivers in Nepal. It is also famous for its cultural diversity.

At the time of the 1991 Nepal census, Prakashpur had a population of 11,110 people living in 1987 households, primarily employed in agriculture.

== Geography ==
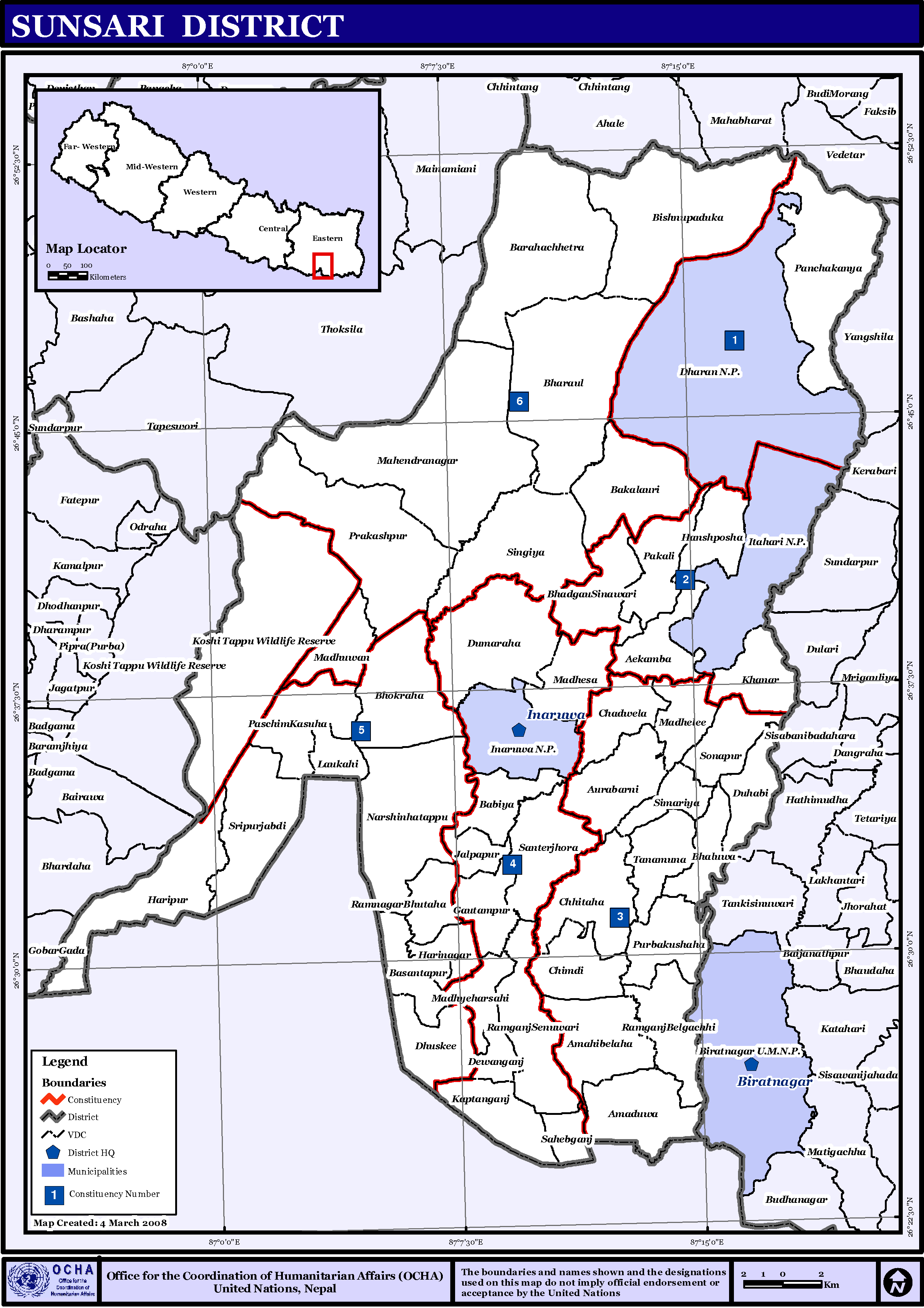
Map of the Sunsari District, Nepal.

Prakashpur city is near the Indo-Nepal-China Tibet border, south of Mount Everest, Southwest of Dharan, in Sunsari district of Koshi zone, Nepal. The VDC is bounded by Mahendranagr to the north, Bhokraha to the south, Dumraha to the east, and Madhuban to the west. It is bisected by the Koshi River, with the western half of the VDC being part of the Koshi Tappu Wildlife Reserve.

== Transportation ==
The main routes to Prakashpur are:

- Inaruwa-Bhokraha-Prakashpur Road (13 km)
- Prakashpur-Mahendranagar-Nadaha-Dharan (30 km) Approx.
- Prakashpur-Singiya-Jhumka-Pakali-Itahari (via Ramdhuni Temple) (17 km)
- Loukahi-Madhuban-Prakashpur-Rajabas-Mahendranagar-Chatara (Barahachhetra-New Saptakoshi Bridge-Barahachhetra Temple)

== Health ==
Prakashpur Health Post is a Government Body charge with providing health services.

== Governance ==
Prakashpur is controlled by the Nepalese Government.

== Notables ==
- Deepak Limbu
1. nepaliboy
