= Gadhi Rural Municipality =

Gadhi गढी गाउँपालिका
- Rural Municipality
- Location in Province No. 1 Gadhi (Nepal)
- Coordinates: 26.58°N 87.21°E
- Province: Province No. 1
- District: Sunsari
- Wards: 6
- Established: 10 March 2017
- Seat: Aurabani

Government
  - Type: Rural Council
  - Chairperson: Mr. Ash Narayan Chaudhary ([UML])
  - Vice-chairperson: Mrs. Anita Kumari Shah ([UML])

Area
  - Total: 67.7 km^{2} (26.1 sq mi)

Population (2021)
  - Total: 38,739
  - Density: 572/km^{2} (1,480/sq mi)
  - Literacy: 70.8 %▲
- Time zone: UTC+5:45 (Nepal Standard Time)
- Website: official website

Gadhi (Nepali: गढी गाउँपालिका) is one of six rural municipalities (gaunpalika) located in Sunsari District of Province No. 1, Nepal. There are a total of 12 municipalities in Sunsari, of which 6 are urban and 6 rural.

According to Ministry of Federal Affairs and Local Developme Gadhi has an area of 67.7 square kilometres (26.1 mi^{2}) and the total population of the municipality is 34852 as of the 2021 Census of Nepal.

Madheli, Aurabani, Chhitaha and Satterjhora which previously were all separate village development committees (VCDs) merged to form this new local level body. Fulfilling the requirement of the new Constitution of Nepal 2015, Ministry of Federal Affairs and Local Development replaced all old VDCs and Municipalities into 753 new local level body (Municipality).

The rural municipality is divided into total 6 wards and the headquarter of this newly formed rural municipality is situated in Aurabani.
