= Jalpapur =

Jalpapur जल्पापुर
- Village development committee
- Interactive map of Jalpapur
- Location in Nepal
- Coordinates: 26.55°N 87.14°E
- Country: Nepal
- Zone: Kosi Zone
- District: Sunsari District
- Elevation: 83 m (272 ft)

Population (1991)
  - Total: 4,256
- Time zone: UTC+5:45 (Nepal Time)

Jalpapur was a former village development committee in Sunsari District in the Kosi Zone of south-eastern Nepal. It is bounded by Satterjhora in the east, Gautampur in the south, Ramnagar in the southwest and Babiya in the north. At the 1991 Nepal census, it had a population of 4,256 people living in 663 individual households. Currently, it is merged with District Headquarter Inaruwa municipality as ward no. 10 and lies in the southern part of Inaruwa Municipality. This village is considered one of the famous and historically significant villages of Nepal. The village is home to Darul Uloom Noorul Islam, one of the largest and oldest Islamic seminaries in Nepal. The madrasa is approximately 76 years old. Students from not only different parts of Nepal but also from Bihar, India, come here to receive Islamic education.

The village also holds a prominent position in the field of Islamic scholarship. It has produced a number of Islamic scholars who have contributed to religious education in Nepal. Among the notable scholars associated with this village are Maulana Abbas Nadwi, Maulana Islam Nadwi, Maulana Ayyub Nadwi, and Maulana Haider Ali Nadwi. Their scholarly and religious services have further enhanced the reputation of the village.

From an economic perspective, most of the people of the village are engaged in agriculture, overseas employment, and construction work. Many residents work abroad, while others earn their livelihood locally through farming and construction. The mother tongue of the people in this village is Maithili, while a large number of them speak, read, write, and understand Urdu and Nepali.

Pokhari Chowk is the main and central junction of the village. In addition, Bhutaha and Inaruwa Bazaar are the main markets in the area.

With its rich religious heritage, long-standing Islamic institution, renowned scholars, and hardworking community, this village has developed a unique identity and is regarded as one of the well-known villages of Nepal.

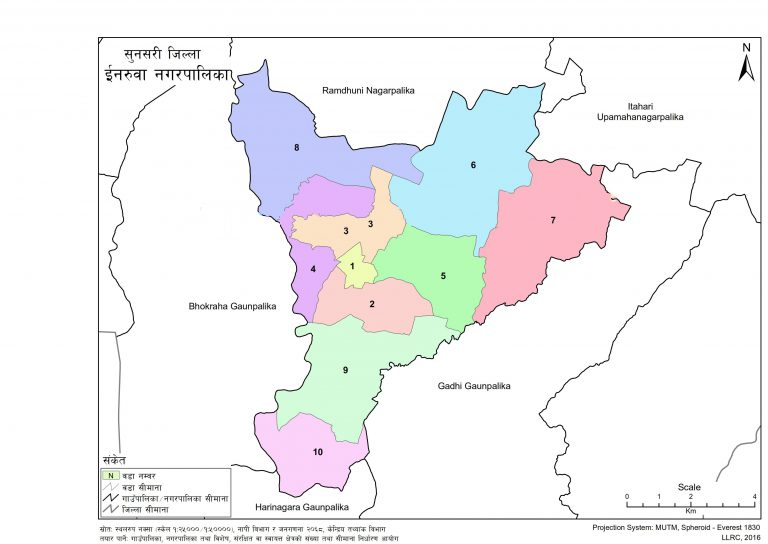
Ward Division map of Inaruwa Municipality

Jalpapur is connected to Inaruwa-Kaptanganj Highway.
