= Bhokraha Rural Municipality =

Bhokraha Narsingh Rural Municipality भोक्राहा नरसिंह गाउँपालिका
- Rural Municipality
- Upcoming Event: Bhokraha Premier League, Koshi Premier League
- Location in Province No. 1 Bhokraha Narsingh Rural Municipality (Nepal)
- Coordinates: 26.63°N 87.1°E
- Province: Province No. 1
- District: Sunsari
- Wards: 8
- Established: 10 March 2017

Government
  - Type: Rural Council
  - Chairperson: Mr. AJMAL AKHTAR MIYA
  - Vice-chairperson: Mrs. Sunita Uraw

Area
  - Total: 63.37 km^{2} (24.47 sq mi)

Population (2011)
  - Total: 40,509
  - Density: 639.2/km^{2} (1,656/sq mi)
- Time zone: UTC+5:45 (Nepal Standard Time)
- Headquarter: Bhokraha
- Website: official website

Bhokraha or Bhokraha Narsingh (Nepali: भोक्राहा गाउँपालिका) is one of six rural municipalities (gaunpalika) located in Sunsari District of Province No. 1 of Nepal. There are a total of 12 municipalities in Sunsari, of which 6 are urban and 6 rural.

According to Ministry of Federal Affairs and Local Development Bhokraha has an area of 63.37 square kilometres (24.47 mi^{2}) and the total population of the municipality is 40,509 as of Census of Nepal 2011.

Bhokraha and Narsingh which previously were all separate Village development committee merged to form this new local level body. Fulfilling the requirement of the new Constitution of Nepal 2015, Ministry of Federal Affairs and Local Development replaced all old VDCs and Municipalities into 753 new local level body (Municipality).

The rural municipality is divided into 8 wards and the headquarter of this newly formed rural municipality is situated in Bhokraha.

Bhokraha and Narsingh which previously were all separate Village Development Committees (VDCs) merged to form this new local level body. Fulfilling the requirement of the new Constitution of Nepal 2015, Ministry of Federal Affairs and Local Development replaced all old VDCs and municipalities into 753 new local level body (Municipality). The rural municipality is divided into total 8 wards and the headquarter of this newly formed rural municipality is situated in Bhokraha.

== Demographics ==
Religion in Bhokhraha (2021)
Religion	Percent
Hinduism	55.6%
Islam	42.5%
Kirat Mundhum	0.1%
Buddhism	0.03%
Christianity	0.1%
Other	1.4%

Religion: 55.6% were Hindu, 42.5% Muslim, 0.1% Kirat Mundhum, 0.03% Buddhist and 0.1% Christian and 1.4% others.

Ethnicity/caste of Bhokraha (2021)
1. Muslim (42.1%)
2. Kushwaha (12.4%)
3. Yadav (11.3%)
4. Kurukh (9.80%)
5. Dhanuk (4.60%)
6. Teli (4.00%)
7. Musahar (3.80%)
8. Khatwe (2.40%)
9. Sarbaria (2.00%)
10. Mallaha (1.20%)
11. Others (6.40%)

The largest communities are the Muslims and kushwaha . Other communities include the yadav and Kurukhs.

Languages of Bhokhraha (2021)
1. Maithili (61.0%)
2. Urdu (27.4%)
3. Kurukh (9.70%)
4. Nepali (1.60%)
5. Hindi (0.10%)
6. Others (0.30%)

As their first language, 61.0% of the population spoke Maithili, 27.4% Urdu, 9.7% Kurukh, 1.6% Nepali, 0.3% others,as their first language.

== See also ==
- Bhokraha Narsingh Ground
- Saptakoshi Neuro Hospital
