= Harinagara Rural Municipality =

Harinagar Rural Municipality हरिनगर गाउँपालिका
- Rural Municipality
- Location in Koshi Province Harinagar Rural Municipality (Nepal)
- Coordinates: 26.503297°N 87.121947°E
- Province: Koshi Province
- District: Sunsari
- Number of Wards: 7
- Established: 10 March 2017

Government
  - Type: Rural Council
  - Chairperson: Mr. Gafar Ansari Miya (NC)
  - Vice-chairperson: Mrs. Rimjhim Kumari Bhagat (NC)

Area
  - Total: 52.29 km^{2} (20.19 sq mi)

Population (2021)
  - Total: 49,845
  - Density: 953.2/km^{2} (2,469/sq mi)

Language
  - Official: Nepali
  - Additional: Maithili
- Time zone: UTC+5:45 (Nepal Standard Time)
- Sex Ratio: 97.19. ♂ /100 ♀ (2021)
- Website: official website

Harinagar (Nepali: हरिनगर गाउँपालिका) is a rural municipality (gaunpalika) one of six rural municipalities located in Sunsari District of Koshi Province of Nepal. There are a total of 12 municipalities in Sunsari, of which 6 are urban and 6 rural.

According to the Ministry of Federal Affairs and Local Development, Harinagar has an area of 52.29 square kilometres (20.19 mi^{2}) and the total population of the municipality is 49845 as of the 2021 Census of Nepal. From the total population, Islam has the highest number of followers, the Muslim community is 28,825 individuals, or 57.83%; Hinduism is 33.07%; and 9.10% are other religions.

Ramnagar Bhutaha, Gautampur, Harinagara, Basantapur and Ghuski which previously were all separate Village development committee merged to form this new local level body. Fulfilling the requirement of the new Constitution of Nepal 2015, Ministry of Federal Affairs and Local Development (Nepal) replaced all old VDCs and Municipalities into 753 new local level body (Municipality).

The rural municipality is divided into a total of 7 wards and the headquarter of this newly formed rural municipality is situated in Harinagara VDC.

== Chairperson ==
| Election | Chairperson | Party | Tenure |
|---|---|---|---|
| 2074 | Gafar Ansari | Nepali Congress | 2074-2079 |
| 2079 | Gafar Ansari | Nepali Congress | 2079-2084 |

== Administration Division ==
In terms of administrative division, it has been divided into 7 wards on the basis of geography and population, in which Ward No. 1 has been established, including the territories of Wards No. 1, 2, 6, 8, and 9 of Ramnagar Bhutaha of Savik, while Ward No. 2 has been established with the territories of Ward No. 3, 5, and 7 of the same Village Development Committee of Savik. Similarly, the current Ward No. 3 has been established by including the territories of Ward No. 1 to 9 of Gautampur (Chorghatia) Village Development Committee of Savik, while the current Ward No. 4 has been established by including all the territories of Ward No. 1 to 9 of Haringara Village Development Committee of Savik. Similarly, Ward No. 5 has been established by covering the entire territory of Ward No. 1 to 9 of Basantpur Village Development Committee of Savik, while Ward No. 6 has been established by including the areas of Ward No. 1, 3, 6, 8, and 9 of Ghuski Village Development Committee of Savik and the same village The current Ward No. 7 has been established by including the remaining areas of Ward No. 2, 4, 5, and 7 of the Development Committee.

== Constituencies ==
In terms of parliamentary constituencies, on the federal side, Ward No. 1, 2, 4, 5, 6, and 7 of this rural municipality belong to Region No. 4 of Sunsari District, while Ward No. 3 belongs to Parliamentary Region No. 2. Similarly, towards the Provincial Assembly constituency, 1, 2, 4, 5, 6, and 7 of this rural municipality are in the "A" area under Sunsari Region No. 4, while Ward No. 3 is in the "B" area of Sunsari District Region No. 2.

== Main markets ==
- Bhutaha Bazar
- Haringara Bazar
- Ghuski Bazar

== Major river ==
- Surser Dhar (Sunsari Khola)
- Maria Khola

== Administration ==
See also Rural municipality (Nepal)

A municipality in Nepal is an administrative division in the Provinces of Nepal .It functions as a sub-unit of a district.

Representatives of Harinagar
  - Chairperson - Gafar Ansari
  - Vice-chairperson - Rimjhim Kumari Bhagat
  - Ward Chairman
    - Ward 1 - Prabin Gupta
    - Ward 2 - Muhammad Ansari
    - Ward 3 - Arbind Kumar Mehta
    - Ward 4 - Shree Dav Narayan Mehta
    - Ward 5 - Sikam Lal Yadav
    - Ward 6 - Muhammad Taiab Ansari
    - Ward 7 - Mojjamil Khan

== Harinagar Controversy ==
- https://kathmandupost.com/province-no-1/2024/04/05/prohibitory-order-imposed-in-two-rural-municipalities-in-sunsari

== Religious places ==
Religious places in the municipality

- Shree Shree 108 Durga Mandir, Harinagar 1
- Mithleswer Shiv Mandir Harinagar 1
- Shiv Mandir (Harinagara)
- Eidgah, Haringar 2
- Masjid e Bilal R.Z, Harinagar 2
- Islamiyanagar Sugar Mill Masjid
- Jame Masjid Ghuski

== Educational places ==
Educational institutions' in the municipality

- Hilal Public Mavi, Harinagar 7
- Al Islah Ideal Public School, Harinagar 7
- Balkrishna Secondary School, Harinagar 1
- Harinagar Mavi School, Harinaagr 4
- Jamiatul Musliat Madrasa, Harinaagr 2
- Jamiatul Islah Al Islamia Madras, Harinagar 2
- Shree Secondary School Basantpur Suksena, Harinagar 5
- Shree Janta Secondary School, Harinaagr 3
- Madrasa Quasmia, Harinagr 7
- Bhagawati Aadharvut Vidyalaya, Harinaagr 6
- Madrasa Rizwiya Jaishiya Masudul Uloom, Harinaagr 4
- Madrasa Rizwiya Jaishiya Masudul Uloom, Harinagar 7
