= Dewanganj Rural Municipality =

Dewanganj देवानगञ्ज गाउँपालिका
- Rural municipality
- Location in Province No. 1 Dewanganj (Nepal)
- Coordinates: 26.45°N 87.14°E
- Province: Province No. 1
- District: Sunsari
- Wards: 7
- Established: 10 March 2017

Government
  - Type: Rural Council
  - Chairperson: Mr. Bechan Prasad Mehta (PSP-N)
  - Vice-chairperson: Mrs. Bhiva Devi Yadav (NC)

Area
  - Total: 53.56 km^{2} (20.68 sq mi)

Population (2011)
  - Total: 35,073
  - Density: 654.8/km^{2} (1,696/sq mi)
  - Ethnicities: kushwaha yadav muslim etc
- Time zone: UTC+5:45 (Nepal Standard Time)
- Headquarter: Dewanganj (VDC)
- Website: official website

Dewanganj (Nepali: देवानगञ्ज गाउँपालिका) is a rural community (Gaunpalika) located in the Sunsari District of Province No. 1 of Nepal.

== Geography ==
It is about 5–6 km away from Bihar (India) and the nearest market for its people is in Phulkaha, India. Sunsari hosts 12 communities, 6 urban and 6 rural.

According to the Ministry of Federal Affairs and Local Development, Dewanganj has an area of 53.56 square kilometres (20.68 mi^{2}).

== Demographics ==
The population of the community numbers 39,367 as of the 2021 Census of Nepal.

=== Ethnic groups ===
Ethnic groups in Dewanganj (VDC)
1. kushwaha (40.0%)
2. yadav (17.0%)
3. Muslim (11.0%)
4. Others (32.0%)

The largest ethnic group is Kushwaha, who make up 40% of the population, Yadav and Muslim are the second and third largest groups with 17% and 11% respectively. Other various ethnic groups make up 32% of the population.

== Administration ==
Village development committees Madhyeharsahi, Dewanganj (VDC), Kaptanganj, Sahebganj and Ramganj Senuwari merged to form this local level body. Fulfilling the requirement of the new Constitution of Nepal 2015, Ministry of Federal Affairs and Local Development merged all VDCs and Communities into 753 new local level bodies (Communities).

The newly formed rural community is divided into 7 wards, with its headquarters at Dewanganj (VDC).
