= Hattimuda =

Hattimuda is a village in Satterjhora Village Development Committee in Sunsari District of Province No. 1 in southeast Nepal.
