= Ramganj Belgachhiya =

Ramganj Belgachhiya ऱामग़ञ्ज बॆलगछिया named after Rama, an incarnation of major Hinduism deity Vishnu, is a village in the south of the Sunsari District of Nepal. It is bordered on the south by India's Araria district. North of Ramganj is Purba Kushaha, to the east is Biratnagar Sub Metropolitan City, and to the west is Chimdi Village Development Committee. A road from Biratnagar to Dewanganj goes through Ramganj Belgachhiya via Shukrabare of Ramganj Belgachiya Ward #1. There are 9 wards in this village. Ward No. 1 is joined with Purba Kushaha VDC whereas ward No. 3 is joined with Purba Kushaha and Chimdi VDC.

Ramganj Belgachhiya was declared an ODF (open defecation free) area on 14 July 2014 with the support of Plan Nepal. The V-WASH-CC (Village Water and Sanitation Committee) played a vital role in declaring Ramganj an ODF area. The VDC Secretary Yuwaraj Pokharel, Dil Bahadur Gurung, the president of CBO Sristi Samaj, Govind Sharma Bhatta, Development Coordinator from an INGO Plan International Nepal, local child clubs and women groups especially FCHV (Female Community Health Volunteer) played vital role in this expedition. In the course of this expedition many activities were carried out. The activities were whistling in early mornings in the vulnerable defecating areas, follow-up to families, children's rallies video shows during evenings and FGD (Focussed Group Discussions).

In Ramganj Belgachhiya, there are 5 schools. They are the Shree Nawadurga Madhyamik Viddyalaya in ward #1, Laxmi Primary School in ward # 8, Shree Sarbajanik Rastriya Nimna Madhyamik Viddyalaya in ward #4 and Shree Ramsita Uchcha Madhyamik Viddyalaya in ward #5.
