= Laukahi =

Laukahi may refer to:

- Laukahi, Nepal, a village in Nepal
- Laukahi, Madhubani, a village in Madhubani district, Bihar, India
- Laukahi, Pilibhit, a village in Pilibhit district, Uttar Pradesh, India
- Laukahi, Saharsa, a village in Saharsa District, Bihar, India
