= Kaptanganj =

Kaptanganj may refer to:

- Kaptanganj, India
- Kaptanganj, Nepal
