= Mahendranagar =

Mahendranagar may refer to several places in Nepal:

- Mahendranagar, Mahakali - 2nd largest city in Sudurpaschim Pradesh of Nepal, today Bhimdatta
- Mahendranagar, Janakpur
- Mahendranagar, Kosi
