= Bharaul VDC =

Bharoul VDC भरौल गाविस
- Village development committee
- Location in Nepal
- Coordinates: 26.780872°N 87.192136°E
- Country: Nepal
- Zone: Kosi Zone
- District: Sunsari District

Population (2011)
  - Total: 19,466
- Time zone: UTC+5:45 (Nepal Time)

Bharoul VDC (village development committee) is situated in Sunsari District and its geographic latitude is 26.780872 and longitude is 87.192136. Now it is a part of Barahachhetra Municipality.

== Population ==
According to the 2011 Nepalese Census, Bharoul VDC had a population of 19,466 (8,947 males and 10,519 females) in 4,431 households.
