= Bhawanipur, Sunsari =

Bhawanipur भवानीपुर is a village in Sunsari, Nepal. It is in the west side from Tarahara. Many different groups of people with different castes, cultures, religions, and ethnicities reside in Bhawanipur. Bhawani refers to Shiva.

== Schools ==
- Shahid smriti bawasiye bidyalaya
- Fujisan sagarmatha Boarding school
- Jabdi madhyamik bidyalaye
