= Dewanganj (VDC) =

Dewanganj देवानगञ्ज
- Village development committee
- Location in Nepal
- Coordinates: 26.45°N 87.14°E
- Country: Nepal
- Zone: Kosi Zone
- District: Sunsari District

Population (1991)
  - Total: 4,372
- Time zone: UTC+5:45 (Nepal Time)
- Postal code: 56712
- Area code: 025

Dewanganj is a village development committee in Sunsari District in the Kosi Zone of south-eastern Nepal. At the time of the 1991 Nepal census it had a population of 4372 people living in 774 individual households. It has made many changes in the sector of transportation.
