= Bhaluwa =

Bhaluwa भलुवा
- former Village development committee
- Location in Nepal
- Coordinates: 26.53°N 87.24°E
- Country: Nepal
- Zone: Kosi Zone
- District: Sunsari District

Population (1991)
  - Total: 3,537
- Time zone: UTC+5:45 (Nepal Time)

Bhaluwa is a former village development committee, now part of the municipality of Duhabi-Bhaluwa in Sunsari District in the Kosi Zone of south-eastern Nepal. At the time of the 1991 Nepal census it had a population of 3537 people living in 668 individual households.
