= Mahendranagar, Sunsari =

Baraha Nagarpalika बराहा नगरपालिका
- Municipality
- Location in Nepal
- Coordinates: 26.74°N 87.11°E
- Country: Nepal
- Zone: Kosi Zone
- District: Sunsari District

Population (2011 after being merged with Prakashpur Madhuwan Barahchetra & Bharaul VDC)
  - Total: 85,237
- Time zone: UTC+5:45 (Nepal Time)
- postal code: 56716
- Area code: 025

Barah Nagarpalika previously Mahendranagar is a municipality in Sunsari District in the Kosi Zone of south-eastern Nepal. It is situated near the Koshi River. Most of the residents, as is common in Nepal, depend on agriculture but in the last few years the trend of going to the Persian Gulf region as workers is increasing. The town is yet to have any prominent business houses but is a growing market with a number of small industries, hotels and shops. Being linked with some major cities, Dharan & Itahari of the Sunsari District, this town holds a very good chance of development. There is one community radio station also, named Sunsari FM.

There are a number of schools and a higher secondary school in the town and almost all the children go to primary school and higher school. The fraction of students continuing their studies to higher level is low because of the low economic status of the people. The municipality was previously named Mahendranagar after late king Mahendra.

Most of the residents are Hindu but there is also a small area of Muslims in the village. The village has several temples and also has a mosque and a church.

At the time of the 2011 Nepal census it had a population of 85,237.

== Climate ==
The weather in Barah Municipality is mostly hot. Chakraghatti Pulaha experiences 6 seasons,

Season	Span (Nepali calendar)	Span (Georgian calendar)	Characteristics
Basanta (Spring)	Chaitra-Baisakh	March–April	Around 25-30 degrees Celsius, very dry and windy
Grishma (Summer)	Jestha-Ashad	May–June	Very hot, Up to 40 degrees Celsius, farmers prepare for rice planting
Barsha (Monsoon)	Shrawn-Bhadra	July–August	Hot, very humid and heavy monsoon rains, Krishna Janma Asthami (birth of Krishna) celebrations
Sharad (Autumn)	Ashvin-Kartik	September–October	Calm temperatures, festival season of Dashain and Tihar
Hemanta (Pre winter)	Mangshir-Pausha	November–December	Cold temperatures and sometimes fog (20-10 degrees Celsius), farmers harvest the rice
Sishir (Winter)	Magh-Falgun	January–February	Cold temperatures and foggy weather.
