= Bhadgau Sinawari =

Bhadgau Sinawari भादगाउँ सिनुवारी
- Village development committee
- Location in Nepal
- Coordinates: 26.67°N 87.20°E
- Country: Nepal
- Zone: Kosi Zone
- District: Sunsari District

Population (1991)
  - Total: 8,737
- Time zone: UTC+5:45 (Nepal Time)

Bhadgau Sinawari is a village development committee in Sunsari District in the Kosi Zone of southeastern Nepal. At the 1991 Nepal census, it had a population of 8,737 people living in 1681 individual households.
