= Koshi Tappu Wildlife Reserve =

Wildlife Reserve of Nepal

- Nepali: कोशी टप्पु वन्यजन्तु आरक्ष
- IUCN category IV (habitat/species management area)
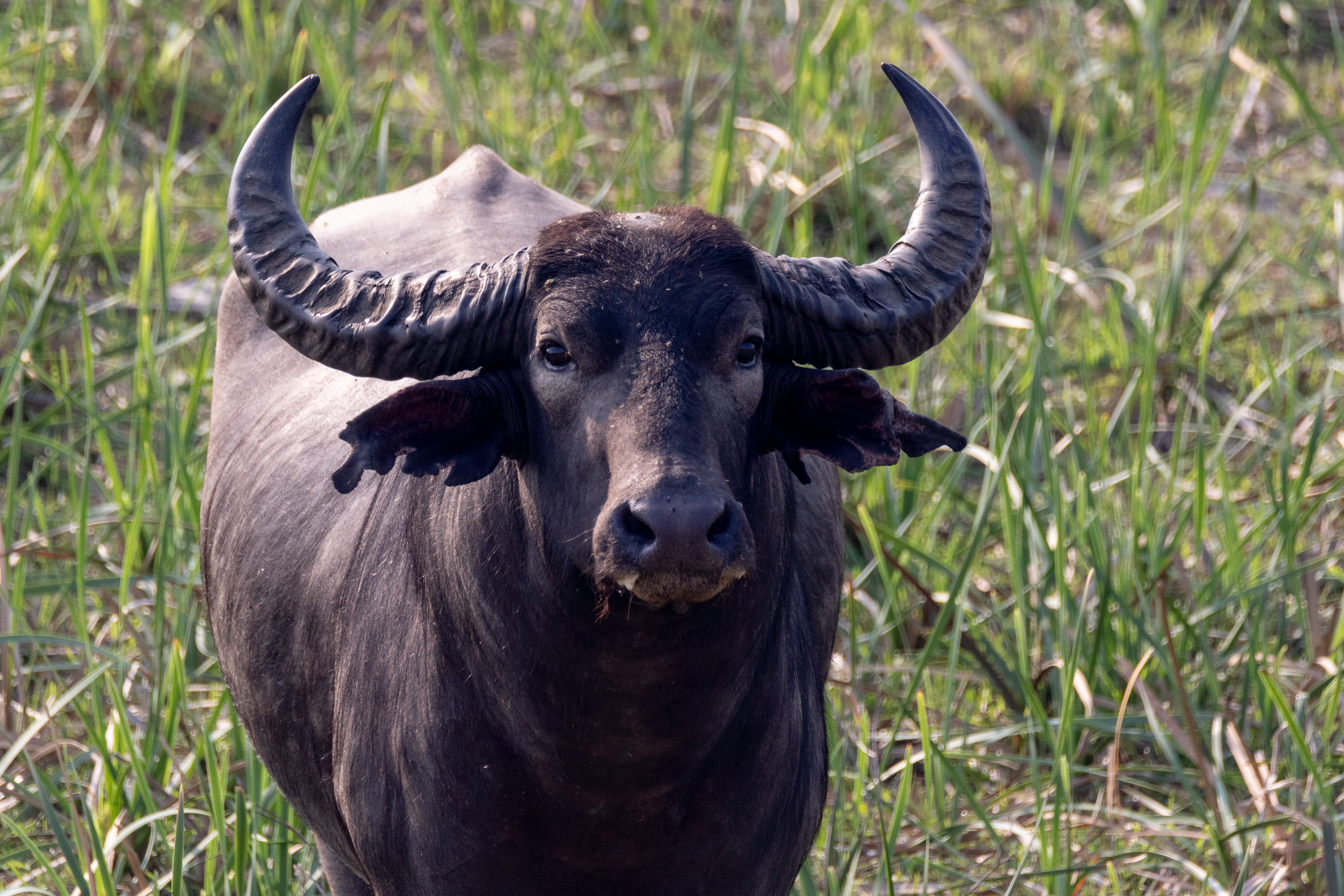
- Wild water buffalo at Koshi Tappu Wildlife Reserve

- Location within Madhesh Province Location within Koshi Province Location within Nepal Location within South Asia
- Location: Nepal
- Nearest city: Inaruwa
- Coordinates: 26°39′N 87°0′E
- Area: 176 km^{2} (68 sq mi)
- Established: 1976
- Governing body: Department of National Parks and Wildlife Conservation (Nepal)
- Website: https://dnpwc.gov.np/

Ramsar Wetland
- Official name: Koshi Tappu
- Designated: 17 December 1987
- Reference no.: 380
- Map

Koshi Tappu Wildlife Reserve is a protected area in the Terai of eastern Nepal covering 176 km^{2} (68 sq mi) of wetlands in the Sunsari, Saptari and Udayapur Districts. It comprises extensive reed beds and freshwater marshes in the floodplain of the Kosi River, and ranges in elevation from 75 to 81 m (246 to 266 ft). It was established in 1976 and designated as a Ramsar site in December 1987. It hosts Nepal's last remaining herd of the wild water buffalo (Bubalus arnee).

== History ==
During 1997 to 1998, an interview survey was conducted in the Paschim Kasuha VDC adjacent to the east of the reserve to investigate the extent of park–people conflict. The findings showed that wild water buffalo and wild boar were major crop raiders between September and February. Large numbers of cattle were found grazing freely inside the reserve. Local people are responsible for illegal utilization of forest products, poaching and river fishing inside the reserve.

In 2005, the reserve together with the Koshi Barrage was identified as one of 27 Important Bird Areas of Nepal.

== Vegetation ==
The vegetation of the reserve is mainly characterised by mixed deciduous riverine forest, grasslands and marshy vegetation. The coverage of grasslands is 68%, compared to only about 6% of forest, which is predominated by Indian rosewood. Patches of catechu forest are more prevalent towards the northwestern part. The grasslands near the running water bodies are maintained by the annual flooding and grazing by wildlife. The Sapta Koshi River, a tributary of the Ganges, causes rapid and intense flooding during the rainy season. In the extensive wetlands, 514 plant species are found including kapok, sugarcane, reed, cattail, Imperata cylindrica, eel grass, and species of Eichhornia, Hydrilla, Azolla and lotus.

== Fauna ==
A wide range of animals inhabit the protected area. In its water courses and ponds, 200 species of fish have been recorded, most of which are resident. Two toad species, nine frog species, six lizard species, five snake species and eleven turtle species are recorded. Gharial and mugger crocodile occur as well.

=== Mammals ===
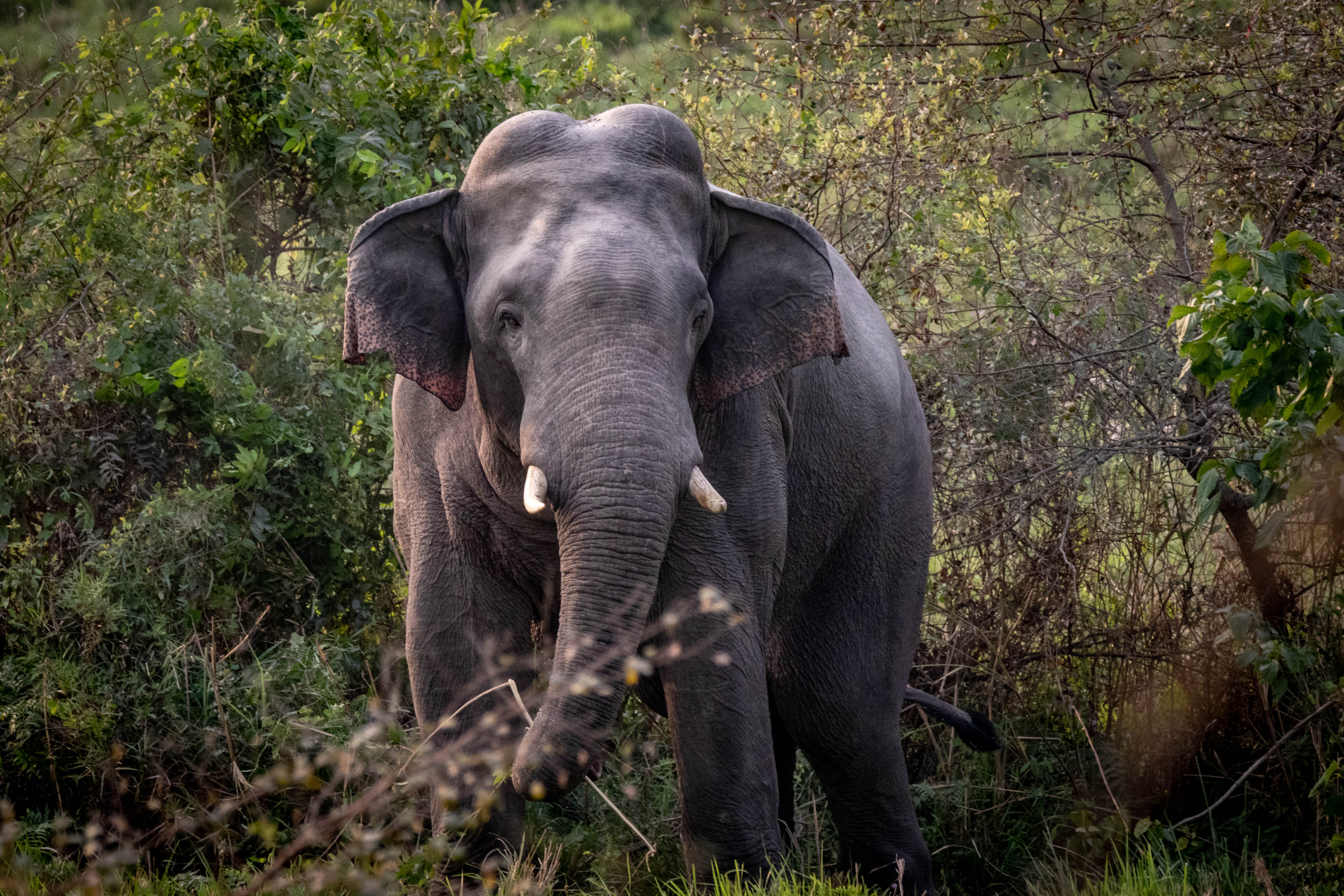
Asian elephant

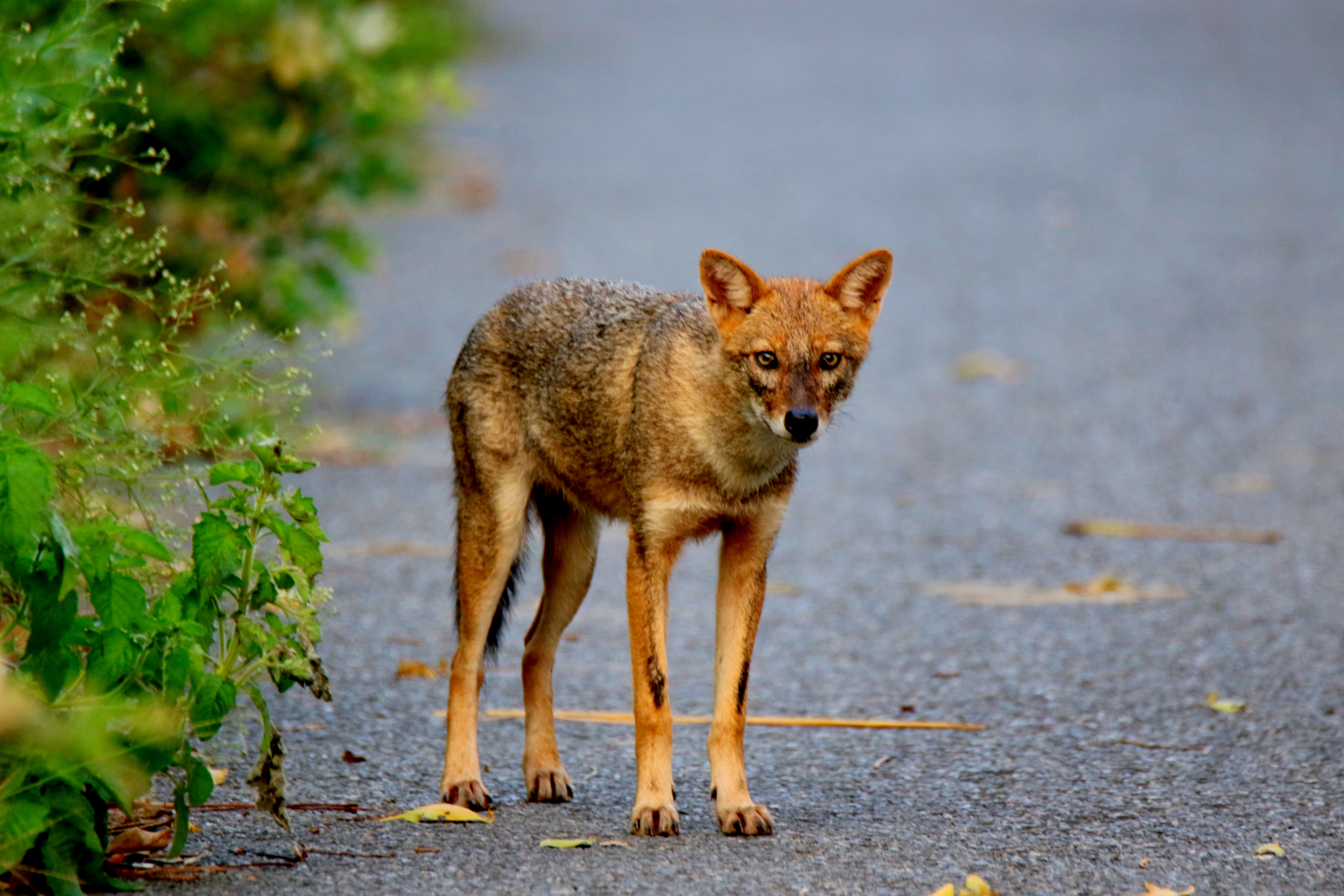
Golden jackal

The 31 species of mammals recorded include the Asian elephant, spotted deer, hog deer, wild boar, smooth-coated otter and golden jackal. The Ganges river dolphin has been sighted in the Koshi River. Gaur and nilgai have declined in numbers. Nepal's last remaining population of about 150 wild water buffalo inhabit the area. This population has now grown to a total of 432 individuals with an annual growth rate of 7.27 percent, according to the latest census carried out in 2016. With this upsurge in the population, authorities are planning a possible transfer of some wild water buffaloes to the flood plains of Chitwan National Park where they had become extinct in the 1950s.

=== Birds ===
Notable among the 485 bird species are watercock, Indian nightjar, dusky eagleowl, black-headed cuckooshrike, whitetailed stonechat, striated grassbird, large adjutant stork, Pallas's fish eagle, common golden-eye, and gullbilled tern. Swamp francolin and rufous-vented grass babbler occur as well.

In spring 2011, 17 Bengal floricans were recorded from nine different sites along a 39 km (24 mi) north-south stretch of the Koshi River. Seven were males and 10 were females. Only five individuals were recorded outside the reserve, two pairs north of Koshi Tappu, and one female seen twice near the Koshi Barrage area.
