= Lal Bikram Thapa =

Nepalese politician

The Honourable Lal Bikram Thapa
- लालबिक्रम थापा

Member of Parliament, Pratinidhi Sabha
- Incumbent
- Assumed office 26 March 2026
- President: Ram Chandra Poudel
- Preceded by: Rajib Koirala
- Constituency: Sunsari 2

Personal details
- Citizenship: Nepalese
- Party: Rastriya Swatantra Party
- Profession: Politician

Lal Bikram Thapa (Nepali: लालबिक्रम थापा) is a Nepalese politician serving as a member of parliament from the Rastriya Swatantra Party. He is the member of the 7th Pratinidhi Sabha elected from Sunsari 2 constituency in 2026 Nepalese General Election securing 57,348 votes and defeating his closest contender Rajib Koirala of the Nepali Congress.

== Legal Issues ==
In January 2026, legal complaint was filed against Thapa by independent candidate Satya Narayan Pandit, where he was alleged for NPR 7.4 Million failed outstanding dues owned to Janata Secondary School of Itahari-9. On 22 January of the same month, Election office of Inaruwa had dismissed the case citing insufficient evidence.
