= Dumaraha =

Dumraha डुम्राहा
- Village development committee
- Location in Nepal
- Coordinates: 26.65737°N 87.14904°E
- Country: Nepal
- Zone: Kosi Zone
- District: Sunsari District

Population (1991)
  - Total: 13,215
- Time zone: UTC+5:45 (Nepal Time)

Dumraha is a village development committee in Sunsari District in the Kosi Zone of south-eastern Nepal. According to the State Reformation Act by the Nepal Government, it now lies in two municipalities; Inaruwa Municipality and Ramdhuni Municipality. The main wards and villages of Dumaraha are Arta, Sitpur, Marchaya, Kansamadan, and Bankulwa. At the 1991 Nepal census, it had a population of 13,215 people, living in 2,426 individual households.

Community schools in the district include Shree Tribhuvan Secondary School, Shera Primary School, Thule Mohor Primary School, and Sanischare Secondary School. Private schools include Siddhartha Shikshya Sadan and M.S. Standard English School, The Shera River flows by the side of the Ramdhuni Forest past Arta village. Nearby is Ramdhuni Temple. The village is connected by roads but electricity and the development of infrastructure are not as rapid as expected.

== Location ==
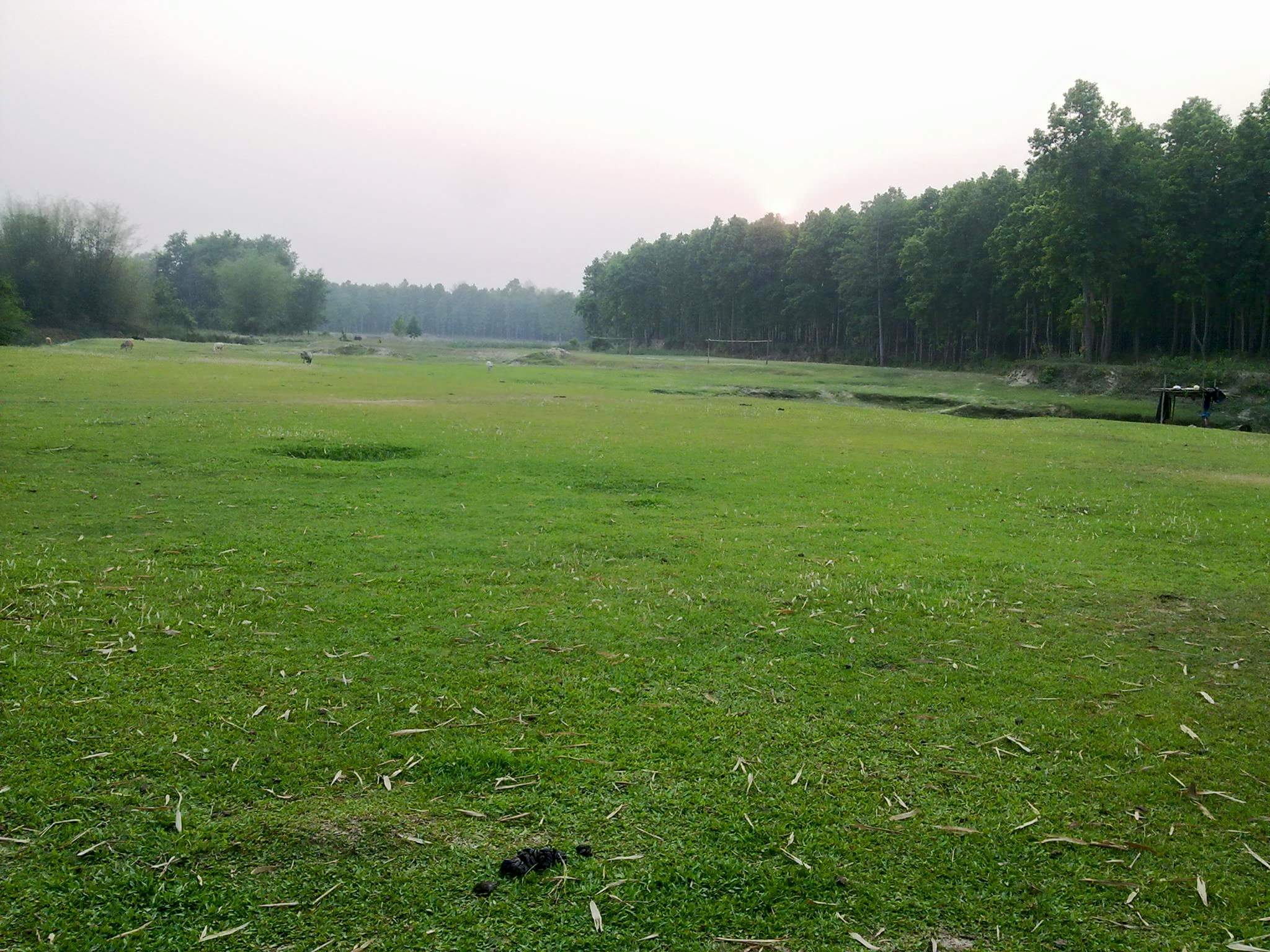
A view of a field near Ramdhuni Forest

Dumraha is located at 26.65737 degrees north and 87.14904 degrees east. The neighboring village development committees (VDC) and Municipalities are Ramdhuni Bhasi Municipality, Inaruwa Municipality, Bhokraha VDC and Prakashpur VDC. The office of Dumraha VDC is about 6 kilometers away from Inaruwa. It has a monsoon-influenced humid subtropical climate.

== History ==
Dumraha VDC is historic in the sense that the ethnic groups of Tharu, Musahar, and Dom have been living there for several generations. The name Dumraha may have been named because of the Dom community people living there, as Dumraha can be linguistically broken as "DUM- RAHA" where "DUM" refers to Dom Community, and "RAHA" in Maithali or Tharu language means "staying". So, Dumraha could have been named as "Dom Community People were living there in the past."

== Ethnic groups ==
In the past, people from Tharu, Dhanuk, Muhasar and Dom communities were living there. But after 2007 due to migration of people from the hilly region and later of people from India, the chief ethnic groups are Brahmin, Chhetri, Tharu, Mehata, Newar, Rai, Limbu, Dom, Dhanuk, Musahar etc.

== Natural resources ==
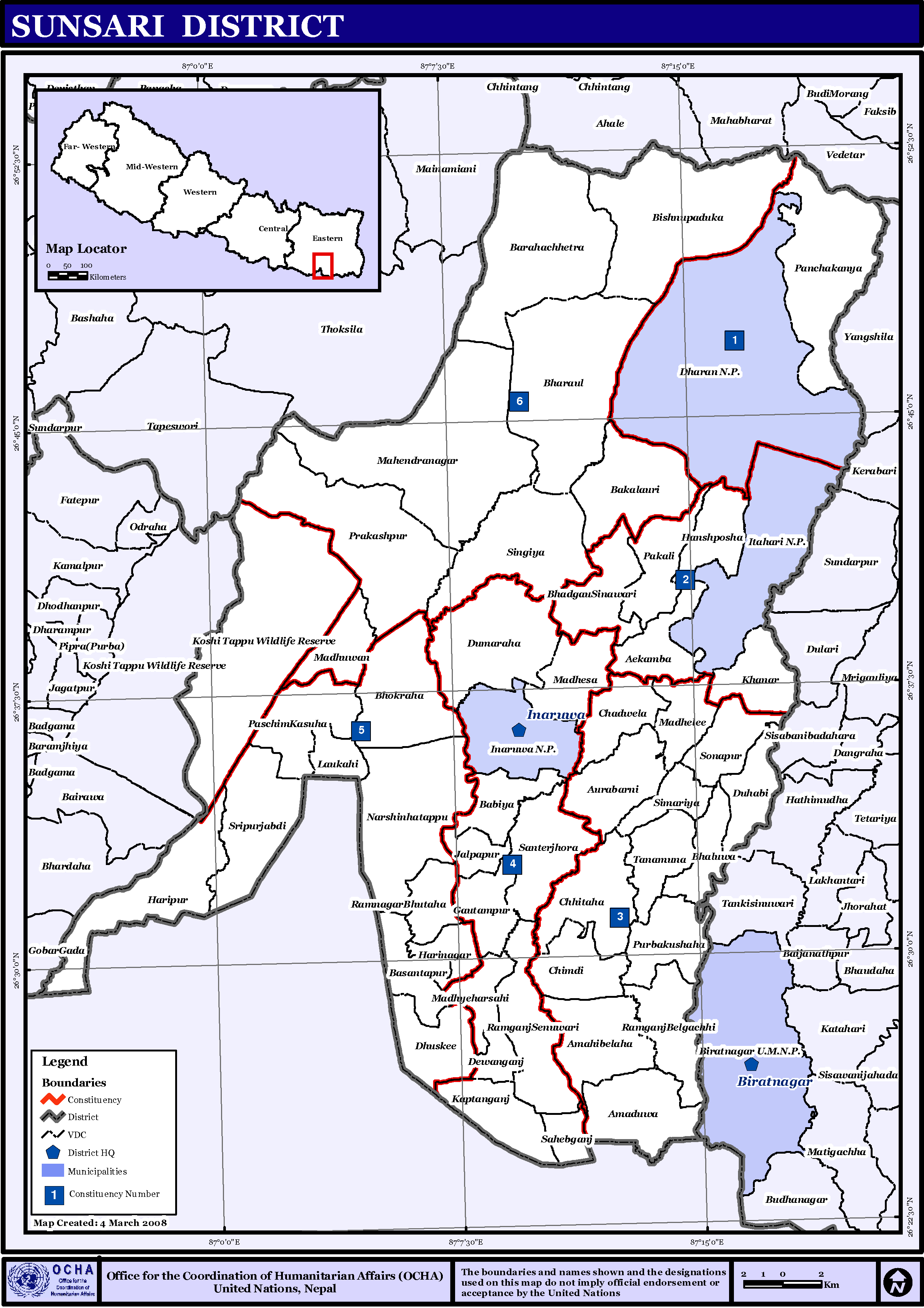
Location of Dumraha VDC

Dumraha is rich in natural resources. The soil is appreciably fertile and large amounts of rice, wheat, maize, sugarcane, jute etc. are grown and supplied to nearby trade centres.

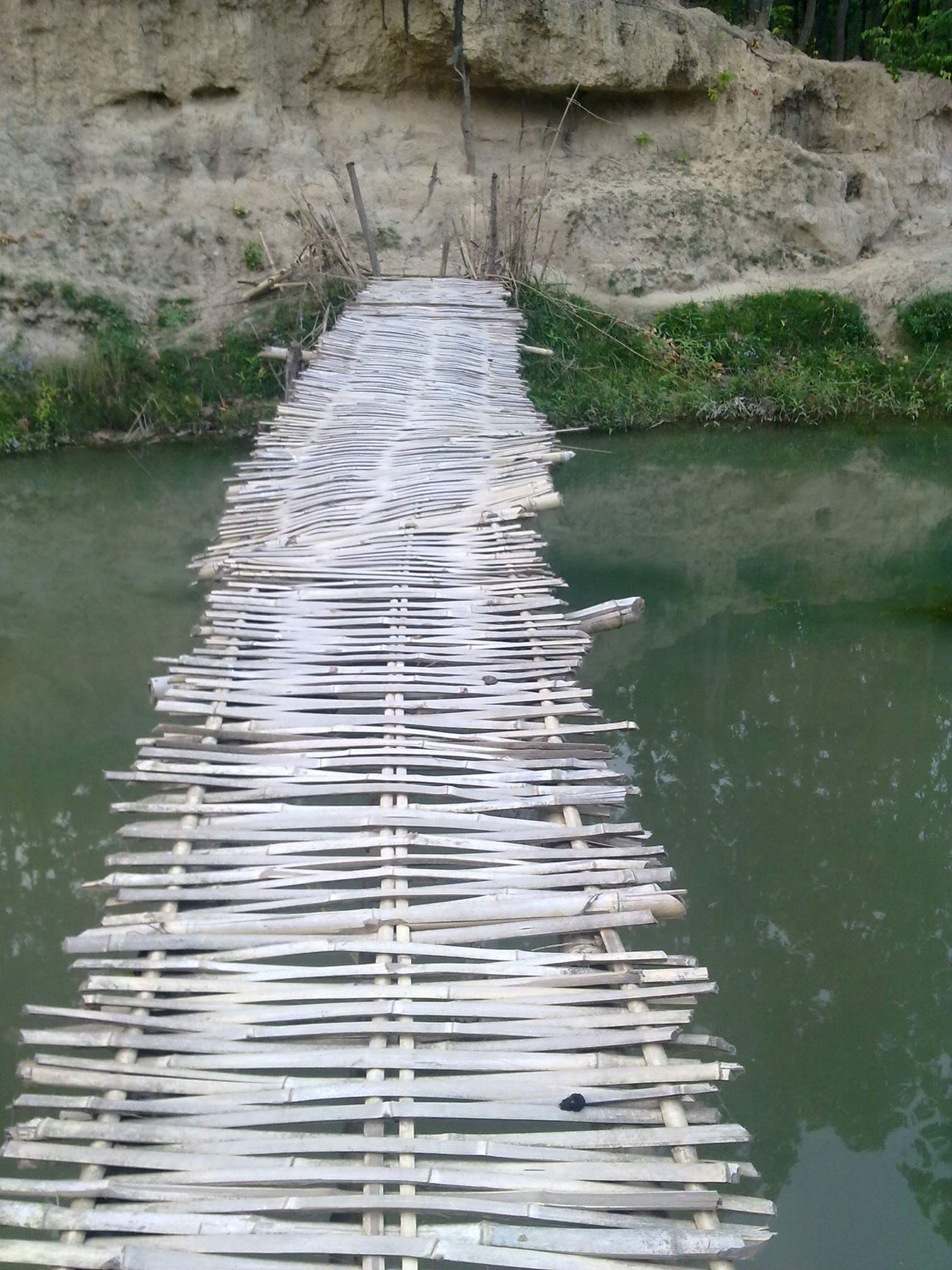
Bamboo-bridge over Sehara river at Dumraha-3

Ramdhuni Forest which is in Dumraha VDC is rich in timber and Shehara River flows by the side if forest.
