= Singiya =

Singiya राम्धुनी भासी नगरपालिका Ramdhuni-Bhasi
- Municipality
- Location in Nepal
- Coordinates: 26.69°N 87.16°E
- Country: Nepal
- Zone: Kosi Zone
- District: Sunsari District

Government

Population (1991)
  - Total: 82,843
- Time zone: UTC+5:45 (Nepal Time)
- Area code: 025

Singiya(VDC) has been replaced by municipality in Sunsari District in the Kosi Zone of south-eastern Nepal. At the time of the 1991 Nepal census it had a population of 82,843 people living in 1,632 individual households.
