= Jhumka =

- Town
- Nickname: J TOWN
- Location within Nepal
- Coordinates (26°40'08.6"N 87°11'49.4"E): 26°40′08″N 87°11′49″E
- Country: Nepal
- Zone: Kosi
- District: Sunsari District
- Time zone: UTC+5:45 (Nepal Standard Time)
- Area code: +977

Jhumka is a town in the Sunsari District of Nepal. It is located between Inaruwa and Itahari, some 7 kilometeres from the main city of Itahari. Some of the famous landmarks of Jhumka are Raghunathpur, Jhumka Nahar, Jhumka Park, Pipraha Playground, Miteri Pool, selfi pool, Bamari chowck etc. It is also the gateway to Ramdhuni Mandir, Auliya dham, Chatara and Barahkshetra Mandir. The town is developing. Hiphop is growing rapidly in jhumka and there is some artist Neeraj Chaudhary,JIMDAR, X BLANK, YANDRO They are creating legacy for their city. There are schools, health posts, departmental stores, major banks, and many stores around the town.
