= Aurabarni =

Aurabani औरावनी
- Village development committee
- Location in Nepal
- Coordinates: 26.58°N 87.21°E
- Country: Nepal
- Zone: Kosi Zone
- District: Sunsari District

Population (1991)
  - Total: 5,932
- Time zone: UTC+5:45 (Nepal Time)

Aurabani is a village development committee in Sunsari District in the Kosi Zone of south-eastern Nepal. At the 1991 Nepal census, the population comprised 5,932 people in 1101 individual households.
