= Panchakanya, Sunsari =

Coordinates: 26°47′0″N 87°19′0″E

Panchakanya पाँचकन्या
- Village development committee
- Interactive map of Panchakanya
- Country: Nepal
- Zone: Kosi Zone
- District: Sunsari District

Population (1991)
  - Total: 9,422
- Time zone: UTC+5:45 (Nepal Time)

Panchakanya is a village development committee in Sunsari District in the Kosi Zone of south-eastern Nepal. At the time of the 1991 Nepal census it had a population of 9422 people living in 1803 individual households.
