= Simariya =

Simariya सिमरिया
- Village development committee
- Location in Nepal
- Coordinates: 26.57°N 87.24°E
- Country: Nepal
- Zone: Kosi Zone
- District: Sunsari District

Population (1991)
  - Total: 4,127
- Time zone: UTC+5:45 (Nepal Time)
- Postal code: 56706
- Area code: 025

Simariya is a village development committee in Sunsari District in the Kosi Zone of south-eastern Nepal. At the time of the 1991 Nepal census it had a population of 4127 people living in 791 individual households.
