= Barahakshetra Municipality =

Barahakshetra बराहक्षेत्र
- Municipality (नगरपालिका)
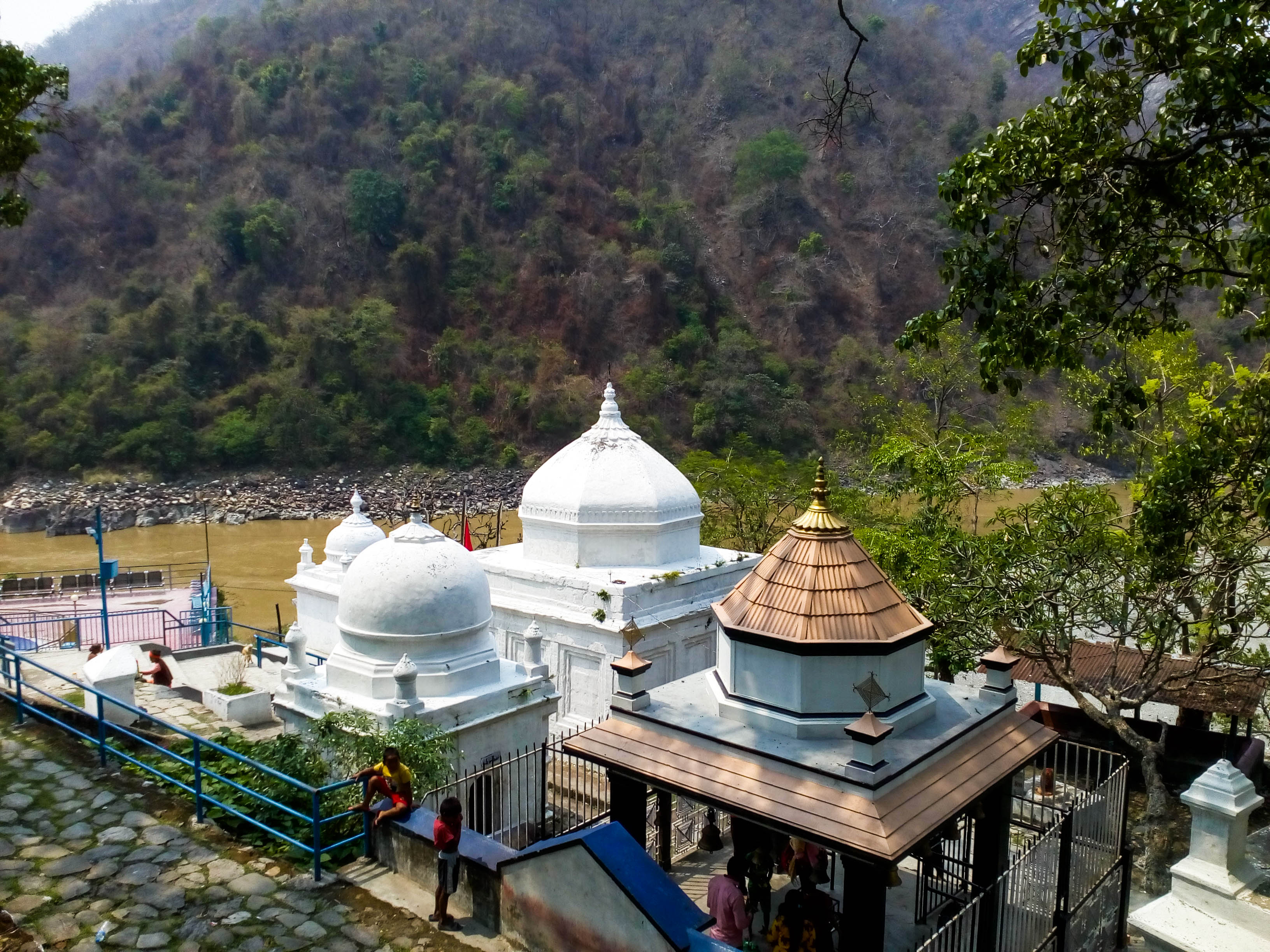
- Barahakshetra Temple

- Location in Koshi Province Barahakshetra (Nepal)
- Coordinates: 26.74°N 87.11°E
- Country: Nepal
- Province: Koshi
- District: Sunsari
- Named for: Barahakshetra

Government
  - Type: Mayor–council
  - Mayor: Ramesh Karki (NC)
  - Deputy Mayor: Nanda Kumari Rai (NCP)

Population (2021)
  - Total: 91,087
- Time zone: UTC+5:45 (Nepal Time)
- postal code: 56716, 56701, 56703, 56704 & 56713
- Area code: 025
- Centre: Chakraghatti, Sunsari district
- Website: www.barahamun.gov.np

Barahakshetra Municipality (Nepali: बराहक्षेत्र नगरपालिका) is a municipality located in Sunsari District of Koshi Province in Nepa]. The area of the municipality is 222 km^{2} and according to the 2021 Census of Nepal, the population of the municipality is 91,087. Barahachhetra is a Hindu pilgrimage site in the municipality.
