= Sonapur, Sunsari =

Sonapur सोनापुर
- Village development committee
- Location in Nepal
- Coordinates: 26.60°N 87.27°E
- Country: Nepal
- Zone: Kosi Zone
- District: Sunsari District

Population (1991)
  - Total: 6,241
- Time zone: UTC+5:45 (Nepal Time)

Sonapur is a village development committee in Sunsari District in the Kosi Zone of south-eastern Nepal. At the time of the 1991 Nepal census it had a population of 6241 people living in 1154 individual households.
