= Bakalauri =

Baklauri बकलौरी
- Village development committee
- Location in Nepal
- Coordinates: 26.72°N 87.22°E
- Country: Nepal
- Zone: Koshi Zone
- District: Sunsari District

Population (1991)
  - Total: 11,835
- Time zone: UTC+5:45 (Nepal Time)
- Postal code: 56704
- Area code: 025

Baklauri is a village development committee in Sunsari District in the Koshi Province of south-eastern Nepal in Koshi Zone. At the time of the 1991 Nepal census, it had a population of 11,835 people living in 2,276 individual households.
