= Ramganj Senuwari =

Rajganj Sinuwari राजगञ्ज सिनुवरी
- Village development committee
- Location in Nepal
- Coordinates: 26.47°N 87.16°E
- Country: Nepal
- Zone: Kosi Zone
- District: Sunsari District

Population (1991)
  - Total: 8,251
- Time zone: UTC+5:45 (Nepal Time)

Rajganj Sinuwari is a village development committee in Sunsari District in the Kosi Zone, Koshi Province of south-eastern Nepal. Currently it lies in Dewanganj Rural Municipality. At the time of the 1991 Nepal census, it had a population of 8251.
