= Tanamuna =

Tanamuna तनमुना
- Village development committee
- Location in Nepal
- Coordinates: 26.55°N 87.23°E
- Country: Nepal
- Zone: Kosi Zone
- District: Sunsari District

Population (1991)
  - Total: 4,859
- Time zone: UTC+5:45 (Nepal Time)

Tanamuna is a village development committee in Sunsari District in the Kosi Zone of south-eastern Nepal. At the time of the 1991 Nepal census it had a population of 4859 people living in 922 individual households.
