= Amahibelaha =

Place in Nepal

Amahibelaha अमाहिबेला
- Village development committee
- Location in Nepal
- Coordinates: 26.46°N 87.20°E
- Country: Nepal
- Zone: Koshi Zone
- District: Sunsari District

Population (1991)
  - Total: 4,700
- Time zone: UTC+5:45 (Nepal Time)

Amahibelaha is a village development committee (VDC) in Sunsari District in the Koshi Zone of south-eastern Nepal. At the 1991 Nepal census, it had a population of 4700 people in 834 individual households. The VDC is a part of Barju Rural municipality.
