= Bishnupaduka =

Former Village development committee in Kosi Zone, Nepal

Bishnupaduka बिष्णुपादुका
- Village development committee
- Location in Nepal
- Coordinates: 26.85°N 87.25°E
- Country: Nepal
- Zone: Kosi Zone
- District: Sunsari District

Population (1991)
  - Total: 3,651
- Time zone: UTC+5:45 (Nepal Time)

Bishnupaduka is a village development committee in Sunsari District in the Kosi Zone of southeastern Nepal. At the 1991 Nepal census, it had a population of 3,651 people living in 661 individual households. It was merged into Dharan in December 2014.
