= Haripur, Sunsari =

koshi ga.pa.haripur-07 हरिपुर Brhamin tol
- Village development committee
- Location in Nepal
- Coordinates: 26.53°N 86.97°E
- Country: Nepal
- Province: Koshi
- District: Sunsari District

Population (1991)
  - Total: 6,499
- Time zone: UTC+5:45 (Nepal Time)
- Area code: 025

Haripur also Known as Bhantabari is a neighborhood in Koshi Rural Municipality of Sunsari District of Koshi Province, Nepal. Previously it was a separate Village Development Committee in Sunsari District in the Koshi Zone of Nepal. Haripur was incorporated into Koshi rural municipality in 2017. At the time of the 1991 Nepal census it had a population of 6499 people living in 1240 individual households.
