= Madhesa =

Madhesa मधेसा इनरुवा वडा न.६
- Village development committee
- Location in Nepal
- Coordinates: 26.63°N 87.19°E
- Country: Nepal
- Zone: Kosi Zone
- District: Sunsari District

Government
  - Type: VDC
  - VDC Chief: Kamal Bhadur Karki

Population (1991)
  - Total: 4,972
- Time zone: UTC+5:45 (Nepal Time)

Madhesa (Nepali: मधेशा) is a former village development committee (VDC) in Sunsari District in the Kosi Zone of south-eastern Nepal. It merged with the district's headquarter Inaruwa in 2015. At the time of the 1991 Nepal census, it had a population of 4972 people living in 891 individual households.
