= Chhitaha =

Chhitaha छिटहा
- Village development committee
- Location in Nepal
- Coordinates: 26.53°N 87.19°E
- Country: Nepal
- Zone: Kosi Zone
- District: Sunsari District

Population (1991)
  - Total: 7,285
- Time zone: UTC+5:45 (Nepal Time)
- Postal code: 56717
- Area code: 025

Chhitaha is a village development committee in Sunsari District in the Kosi Zone of south-eastern Nepal. At the 1991 Nepal census it had a population of 7,285 people living in 1,298 individual households.
