= Ramdhuni-Bhasi =

Ramdhuni
- Municipality
- List of cities in Nepal
- Location in Nepal
- Coordinates: 26°40′N 87°11′E
- Country: Nepal
- Region: Eastern
- Zone: Koshi
- District: Sunsari

Government
  - Mayor: Sankar laal Chaudhary (CPN-UML)
  - Deputy Mayor: Tara Thapa (CPN-UML)

Area
  - Total: 91.69 km^{2} (35.40 sq mi)
- Elevation: 185 m (607 ft)

Population (Population [2021] – Census)
  - Total: 63,452
  - Density: 692/km^{2} (1,790/sq mi)

Languages
  - Local: Nepali, Tharu
  - Official: Nepali
- Time zone: UTC+5:45 (NST)
- Postal Code: 56709
- Area code: 025
- Website: ramdhunibhasimun.gov.np/en/node/29

Ramdhuni is a municipality located in the Sunsari district, Koshi Province of Eastern Nepal. It was established in 2014. Ramdhuni was previously known as Jhumka Bazar. It is approximately 356 km from Kathmandu. This town lies between two famous cities: Itahari and Inaruwa. Mahendra Highway passes through the heart of the town. Chatara Canal (Sunsari Morang Irrigation Project) originates from the Koshi River and flows through the town from north to south. This canal plays an important role in the agriculture of Sunsari and Morang districts. Ramdhuni has a total area of 91.69 square kilometers. It has a population of 63,452. of which 29,820 are males and 29,820 are females, living in 11,491 individual houses.

== Geography ==
Geographically, Ramdhuni is in the Terai region of Nepal. Its elevation is approximately 185m above sea level. This means most of the part of town lies in a proper plain land. Chatara Canal provides water to the irrigation system of the town and surrounding places.

== Transportation ==
It is well connected by roads to the major cities of Nepal including the capital Kathmandu. The nearest airport is Biratnagar Airport which is approximately 30 km from the town of Ramdhuni. Dharan, Itahari, Inaruwa and Biratnagar are some the nearest cities to Ramdhuni. Regular bus service is organised from Dharan, Biratnagar via Ramdhuni to the other major cities of Nepal.

== Tourism ==
It is the gateway to some of the historical places of Sunsari District. It provides the easiest access to the devotees traveling to Chatara (also known as Parchin Haridwar), Barahkshetra Mandir (Baraha Temple), and Ramdhuni Temple.

== Local elections ==
=== Local level election 2079 ===
- Total population: 63, 452
  - Number of wards: 9
  - Election center: 12
  - Number of male voters: 20,103
  - Number of female voters: 21,374
  - Number of other voters: 1
  - Total eligible voters: 42,478

Mayor/chairperson
Party	Mayor/chairperson	Number of votes	Result
Communist Party of Nepal (Unified Marxist–Leninist)	Sankar laal chaudhary	13,372	Elected
Nepali Congress	Sudip Adhikari	11,405	Runner up

Deputy mayor/chairperson
Party	Mayor/chairperson	Number of Votes	Result
Communist Party of Nepal (Unified Marxist–Leninist)	Tara Thapa	12,220	Elected
Nepali Congress	Asha Kumari Chaudhary	10,492	Runner up

Ward president/chairperson
Ward no.	Party	Ward president/chairperson	Number of votes	Result
1	Nepali Congress	Mahesh Kumar Chaudhary	1,204	Elected
2	Communist Party of Nepal (Unified Marxist–Leninist)	Ram Narayan Chaudhary	1,619	Elected
3	Communist Party of Nepal (Unified Marxist–Leninist)	Budh Narayan Chaudhary	1,577	Elected
4	Communist Party of Nepal (Unified Marxist–Leninist)	Kamal Karki	1,610	Elected
5	Nepali Congress	Lekhnath (Bhola) Bastola	1,913	Elected
6	Nepali Congress	Shiva Shankar Rajdhami	1,491	Elected
7	Communist Party of Nepal (Unified Marxist–Leninist)	Keshab Gautam	1,885	Elected
8	Communist Party of Nepal (Unified Marxist–Leninist)	Surendra Singh Khawas	1,200	Elected
9	CPN (Unified Socialist)	Ghan Shyam Chaudhary	1,672	Elected
