= Laukahi, Nepal =

Laukahi
- Village
- Location in Koshi Province Laukahi (Nepal)
- Coordinates: 26.60°N 87.06°E
- Country: Nepal
- Province: Koshi
- District: Sunsari
- Rural Municipality: Koshi Rural Municipality

Population (2018)
  - Total: 6,565
- Time zone: UTC+5:45 (Nepal Time)
- Area code: 025

Laukahi is a village in Koshi Rural Municipality in Sunsari District of Koshi Province, Nepal.

At the 1991 Nepal census, the village population was 6,565 people in 1,591 individual households.

== Background ==
Laukahi was a village development committee in Sunsari District in the Kosi Zone of Nepal before reconstitute of Nepal in 2015
