= Madheli =

Madheli मधेली
- Village development committee
- Location in Nepal
- Coordinates: 26.61°N 87.24°E
- Country: Nepal
- Zone: Kosi Zone
- District: Sunsari District

Population (1991)
  - Total: 6,816
- Time zone: UTC+5:45 (Nepal Time)

Madheli is a village development committee in Sunsari District in the Kosi Zone of south-eastern Nepal. At the 1991 Nepal census, it had a population of 6,816 people living in 1,190 individual households.
