= Sahebganj, Nepal =

Sahebganj साहेवगञ्ज
- Village development committee
- Location in Nepal
- Coordinates: 26.42°N 87.18°E
- Country: Nepal
- Zone: Kosi Zone
- District: Sunsari District

Population (1992)
  - Total: 5,479
- Time zone: UTC+5:45 (Nepal Time)

Sahebganj is a village development committee in Sunsari District in the Kosi Zone of south-eastern Nepal. At the 1991 Nepal census it had a population of 5,479 people living in 842 individual households.
