= Sripurjabdi =

Sripurjabdi श्रीपुरजब्दी
- Village development committee
- Location in Nepal
- Coordinates: 26.57°N 87.02°E
- Country: Nepal
- Zone: Kosi Zone
- District: Sunsari District

Population (1991)
  - Total: 12,937
- Time zone: UTC+5:45 (Nepal Time)

Sripurjabdi is a village development committee in Sunsari District in the Kosi Zone of southeastern Nepal. At the 1991 Nepal census, the village population was 12,937.
