= Ramnagar Bhutaha =

Ramnagar Bhutaha रामनगर भुटाहा
- Harinagar Rural Municipality
- Location in Nepal
- Coordinates: 26.53°N 87.10°E
- Country: Nepal
- Province: Koshi Province
- District: Sunsari District
- Rural Municipality: Harinagara Rural Municipality
- (2017–present)

Government

Population (1991)
  - Total: 8,003
- Time zone: UTC+5:45 (Nepal Time)
- Postal code: 56715
- Area code: 025

Ramnagar Bhutaha is a village development committee in Sunsari District in the Kosi Zone of south-eastern Nepal. Currently, it merged with Harinagar to become a gaunpalika. At the 1991 Nepal census, it had a population of 8,003 in 1,325 individual households.

== Religious places ==
Religious places in the municipality

- Shree Shree 108 Durga Mandir
- Radha Krishna Mandir
- Hanuman Mandir
- Mithleswer Shiv Mandir
- Ram janki mandir
- Saraswati Mata Mandir (Balkrishna School)
