= Madhuwan =

Madhuwan मधुवन
- Ward
- Barahakshettra Ward No. 11
- Interactive map of Madhuwan
- Location in Nepal Madhuwan (Nepal)
- Coordinates: 26.65°N 87.07°E
- Country: Nepal
- Provinces of Nepal: Province No. 1
- District: Sunsari District

Population (1991)
  - Total: 5,737
- Time zone: UTC+5:45 (Nepal Time)
- Postal code: 56713
- Area code: 025

Madhuwan is a village development committee in Sunsari District in the Kosi Zone of south-eastern Nepal. At the time of the 1991 Nepal census it had a population of 5737 people living in 1036 individual households.
