= Duhabi Municipality =

Duhabi दुहवी
- municipality
- Duhabi Municipality
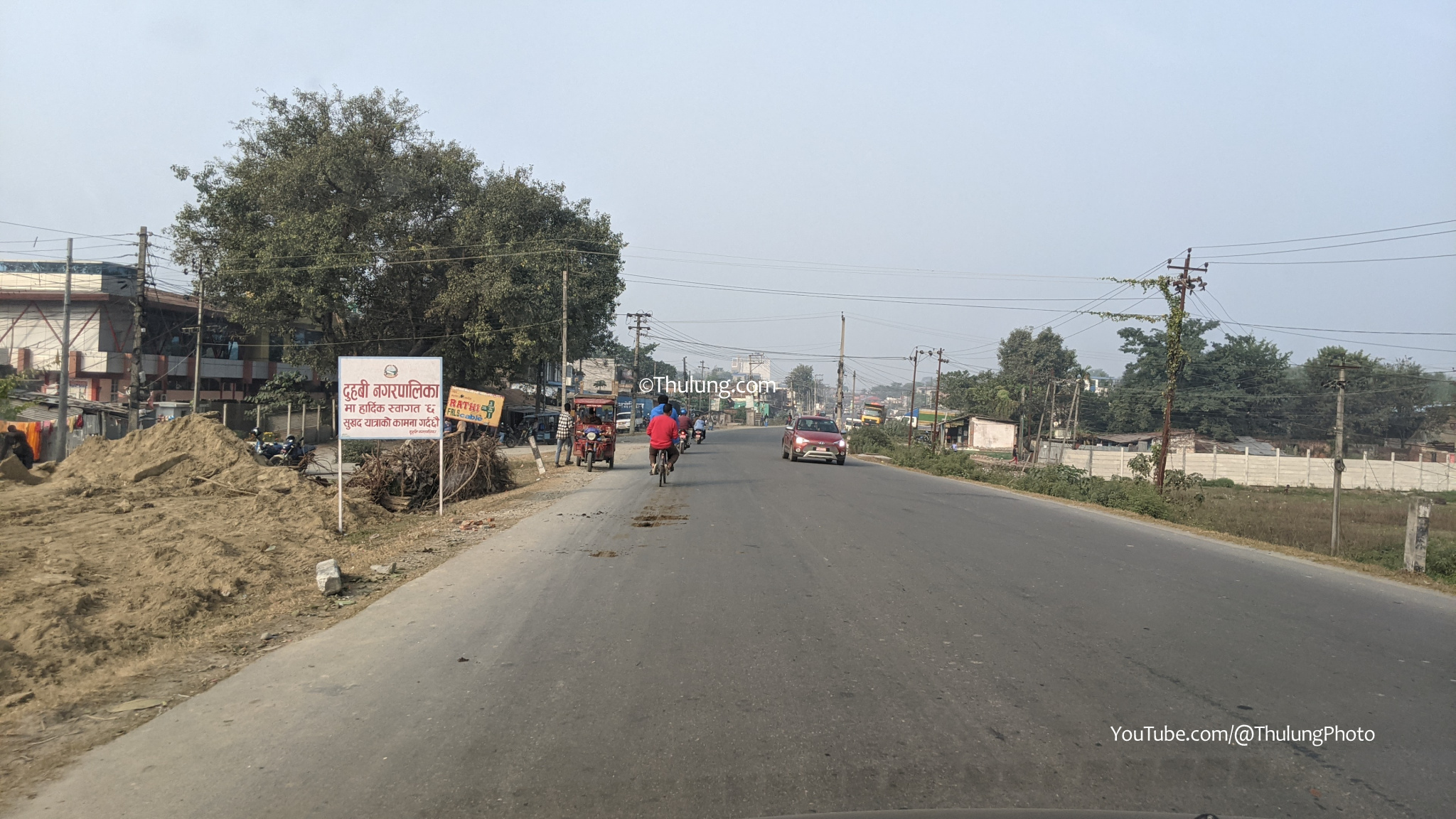
- Duhabi
- Interactive map of Duhabi
- Location of Duhabi Duhabi (Nepal)
- Coordinates: 26.58°N 87.28°E
- Country: Nepal
- province: Koshi
- District: Sunsari

Government
  - Type: Mayor–council government
  - Mayor: Mr. Ved Kumar Gachhadar (NC)
  - Deputy Mayor: Ms. Menuka Pokharel Khatiwada (NC)

Area
  - Total: 76.67 km^{2} (29.60 sq mi)

Population (2022)
  - Total: 67,051
  - Density: 874.5/km^{2} (2,265/sq mi)
- Time zone: UTC+5:45 (NST)
- Postal code: 56707
- Area code: 025
- Highway: Koshi Highway
- Website: official website

Duhabi is a municipality in Sunsari District in the Koshi Zone of south-eastern Nepal. At the 2001 Nepal census, it had a population of 17,574. Duhabi is situated between Itahari and Biratnagar, on the bank of the Budi River. It is the center of Sunsari–Morang industrial corridor.
