= Baraha Kshetra =

Hindu and Kirat pilgrimage site in Sunsari, Nepal

Barahakshetra
- बराहक्षेत्र
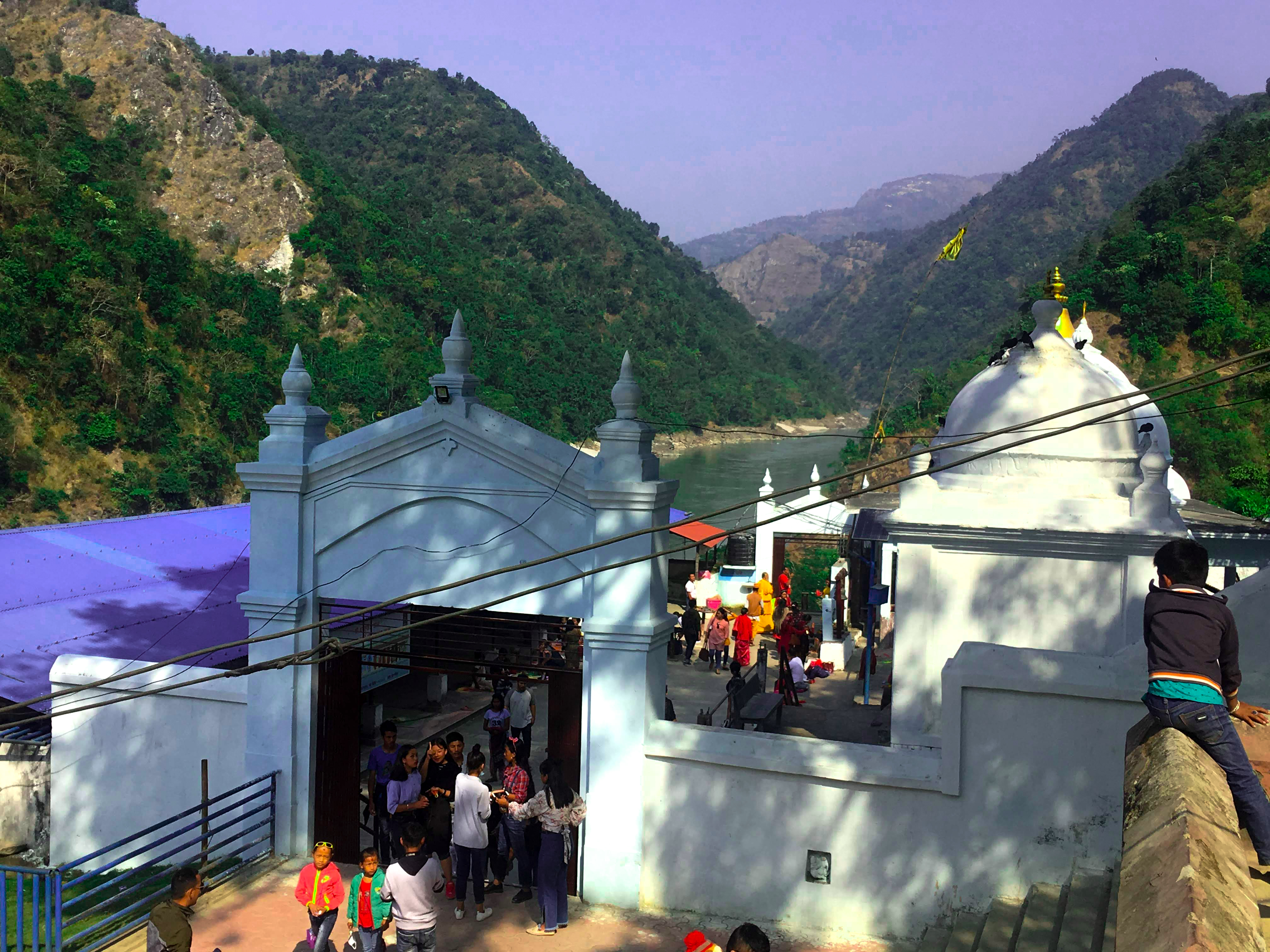
- Barahakshetra Temple Main Gate

- Location in Koshi Province

Religion
- Affiliation: Hinduism
- Deity: Vishnu (as Varaha)
- Festivals: Prabodhini Ekadashi to Kartika Purnima, Maghe Sankranti

Location
- Location: Sunsari District
- State: Koshi Province
- Country: Nepal
- Interactive map of Barahakshetra
- Coordinates: 26.83°N 87.18°E

Architecture
- Type: Dome

Specifications
- Monument: 9
- Elevation: 214 m (702 ft)

Barahachhetra (also Barahakshetra or Varahakshrata; Nepali: वराहक्षेत्र) is a pilgrimage site for Nepali Hindus and followers of the Kirat religion. between the Koka and Koshi rivers in Barahakshetra, Sunsari district, Koshi Province, Nepal. It is one of Nepal's oldest shrines mentioned in Puranas including Brahma Purana, Varaha Purana and Skanda Purana and mentioned in the Mahabharata epic. In Barahachhetra, the Varah, an incarnation of Vishnu is worshiped. Barahachhetra is one of the Char Dham in Nepal.

Char Dham, Nepal
