= Narshinhatappu =

Bhokharaha Narshingh gaupalika (Currently Narsingha) भोक्राहा नरसिंह गाउँपलिका
- Village development committee
- Location in Nepal
- Coordinates: 26.57°N 87.10°E
- Country: Nepal
- Zone: Kosi Zone
- District: Sunsari District

Population (2014)
  - Total: ~25,000
- Time zone: UTC+5:45 (Nepal Time)

Bhokharaha Narshingh gaupalika is aRural municipality in Sunsari District in the Kosi Zone of south-eastern Nepal. At the time of the 2017 Nepal census it had a population of 31,468 people living in 3799 individual households.
