= Amaduwa =

Place in Nepal

Amaduwa अमडुवा
- Village development committee
- Location in Nepal
- Coordinates: 26.43°N 87.21°E
- Country: Nepal
- Zone: Kosi Zone
- District: Sunsari District

Population (1991)
  - Total: 4,715
- Time zone: UTC+5:45 (Nepal Time)

Amaduwa is a village development committee in Sunsari District in the Kosi Zone of southeastern Nepal. At the 1991 Nepal census, it had a population of 4,715 people in 857 individual households.
