= Ghuski, Sunsari =

Ghuski घुस्की Harinagar Ga.Pa
- Village development committee
- Location in Nepal
- Coordinates: 26.46°N 87.11°E
- Country: Nepal
- Zone: Koshi Zone
- District: Sunsari District

Government

Population (2021)
  - Total: 15,121
- Time zone: UTC+5:45 (Nepal Time)
- Postal code: 56718
- Area code: 025

Ghuski is a village development committee in Sunsari District in the Koshi Zone of south-eastern Nepal. At the 2021 Nepal census, it had a population of 15,121 people living in 2,000 individual households.
