= Basantapur, Sunsari =

Basantapur, Sunsari बसन्तपुर
- Village development committee
- Location in Nepal
- Coordinates: 26.50°N 87.10°E
- Country: Nepal
- Zone: Kosi Zone
- District: Sunsari District

Population (1991)
  - Total: 5,566
- Time zone: UTC+5:45 (Nepal Time)

Basantapur is a village development committee in Sunsari District in the Kosi Zone of south-eastern Nepal. At the time of the 1991 Nepal census it had a population of 5566 people living in 879 individual households.

At the center of town is a sculpture of rhododendron, which grows very commonly in the area.

== Tourism ==
Basantapur serves as a base village for some treks including the Tinjure, Milke and Jaljale trek, which provides views of Everest, Kanchenjunga and Makalu, the first, third and fifth highest mountains in the world. Kanchenjuna and Makalu can be seen from Basantapur on a cloudless day.

Aside from lodging, Basantapur has a very local economy and provides only basic amenities. There are no shops geared specifically for tourists or trekkers.

== Transport ==
The road to Basantapur from Dharan is bumpy and slow. Basantapur can be reached from Dharan by local bus in about 4 hours.

Microbuses from Dharan are also available for a nominally higher price and normally arrive quicker than the local buses, which stop more often.

Basantapur can also be reached by hiring a taxi or private Jeep.

== Accommodation ==
There are at least seven lodges in Basantapur, all within walking distance of the bus stop at the center of the village, which takes 5 minutes to walk from one end to the other.
