= Bhokraha, Sunsari =

Bhokraha भोक्राहा Upcoming Event: Bhokraha Premier League by Sunsari Youth Club
- Village development committee
- Nickname: Upcoming Event: Bhokraha Premier League by Sunsari Youth Club
- Location in Nepal
- Coordinates: 26.63°N 87.10°E
- Country: Nepal
- Zone: Kosi Zone
- District: Sunsari District

Population (1991)
  - Total: 12,683
- Time zone: UTC+5:45 (Nepal Time)

Bhokraha is a former village development committee in Sunsari District in the Kosi Zone of south-eastern Nepal. Currently, it merged with Narsinghtappu to become a gaunpalika. At the time of the 1991 Nepal census it had a population of 12,683 people living in 2146 individual households.

== See also ==
- Bhokraha Narsingh Ground
