= Kaptanganj, Nepal =

Kaptanganj कप्तानगन्ज
- Village development committee
- Location in Nepal
- Coordinates: 26.43°N 87.14°E
- Country: Nepal
- Zone: Kosi Zone
- District: Sunsari District

Population (1991)
  - Total: 6,084
- Time zone: UTC+5:45 (Nepal Time)

Kaptanganj is a village development committee in Sunsari District in the Kosi Zone of south-eastern Nepal. At the 1991 Nepal census, it had a population of 6,084 people living in 1,034 individual households.

In 2026, four people died after communal violence broke out between Hindu and Muslim communities in Kaptanganj.
