= Chimdi =

Chimdi चिमडी Chimadi
- Village development committee
- Interactive map of Chimdi
- Location in Nepal
- Coordinates: 26.50°N 87.19°E
- Country: Nepal
- Zone: Kosi Zone
- District: Sunsari District

Population (1991)
  - Total: 4,142
- Time zone: UTC+5:45 (Nepal Time)
- Postal code: 56708
- Area code: 025

Chimdi is a village development committee in Sunsari District in the Kosi Zone of south-eastern Nepal. At the time of the 1991 Nepal census it had a population of 4142 people living in 799 individual households.
