= Gautampur =

Village in Nepal

Gautampur गौतमपुर old name (chaurghatia
- Village development committee, but nowadays it is merged in Harinagar village Development committee
- Nickname: Gautampur
- Location in Nepal
- Coordinates: 26.53°N 87.14°E
- Country: Nepal
- Zone: Koshi Zone
- District: Sunsari District

Population (1991)
  - Total: 3,193
- Time zone: UTC+5:45 (Nepal Time)

Gautampur is a village development committee in Sunsari District in the Koshi Zone of south-eastern Nepal. Neighbouring villages are Ramnagar (popularly known as Bhutaha) in the west, Harinagra in the south, and in the north is Jalpapur village which has been merged into Inaruwa Municipality. At the time of the 1991 Nepal census it had a population of 3,193 people living in 545 individual households.
