= Paschim Kasuha =

Paschim Kasuha पश्चिम कुशाहा
- Village development committee
- Location in Nepal
- Coordinates: 26.62°N 87.05°E
- Country: Nepal
- Zone: Kosi Zone
- District: Sunsari District

Population (1991)
  - Total: 7,921
- Time zone: UTC+5:45 (Nepal Time)

Paschim Kasuha is a village development committee in Sunsari District in the Kosi Zone of south-eastern Nepal. At the 1991 Nepal census, the village population was 7,921 people in 1,410 individual households.
