= Sunsari District =

District in Koshi province

Coordinates: 26°36′07″N 87°08′51″E

Sunsari District Nepali: सुनसरी जिल्ला
- District
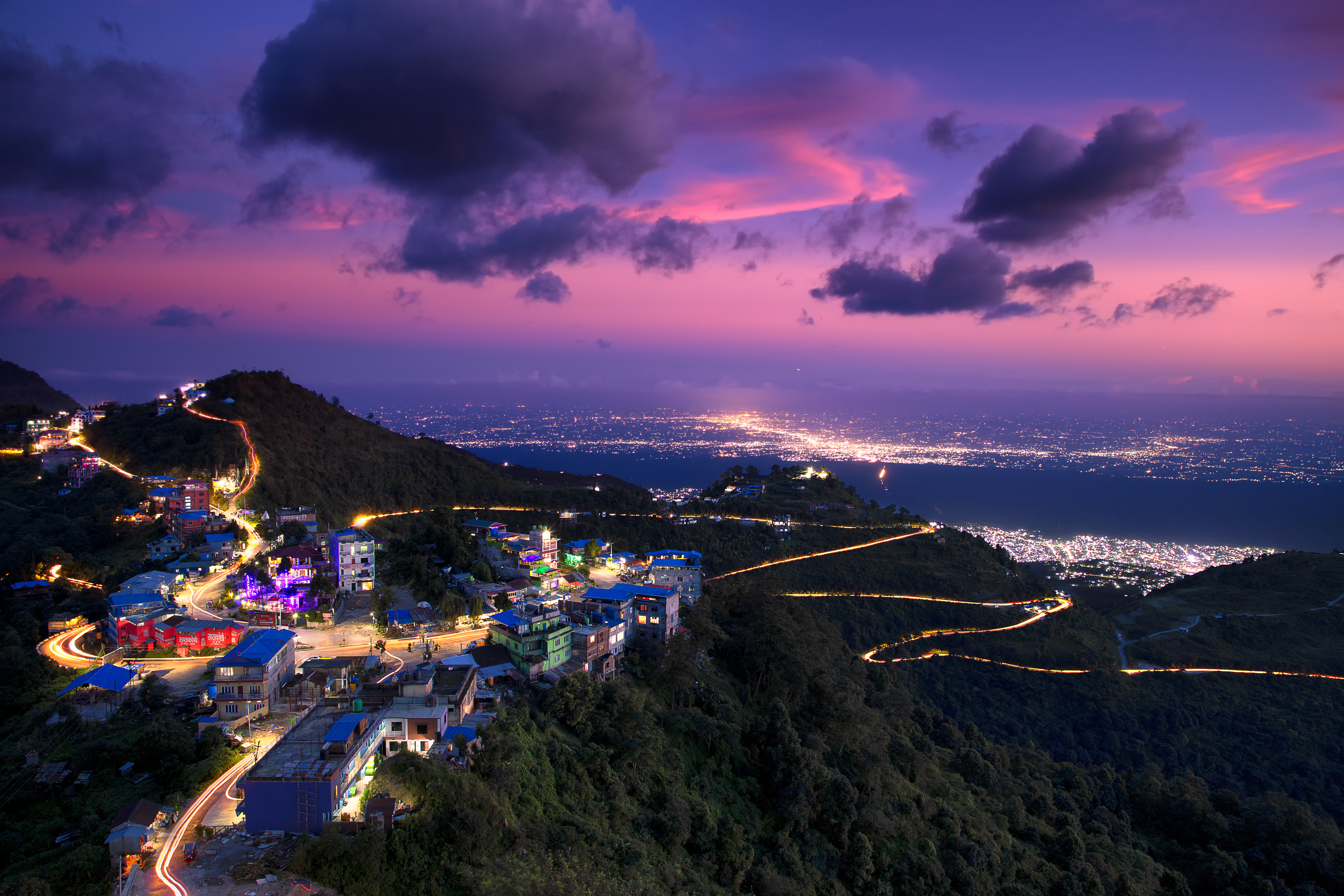
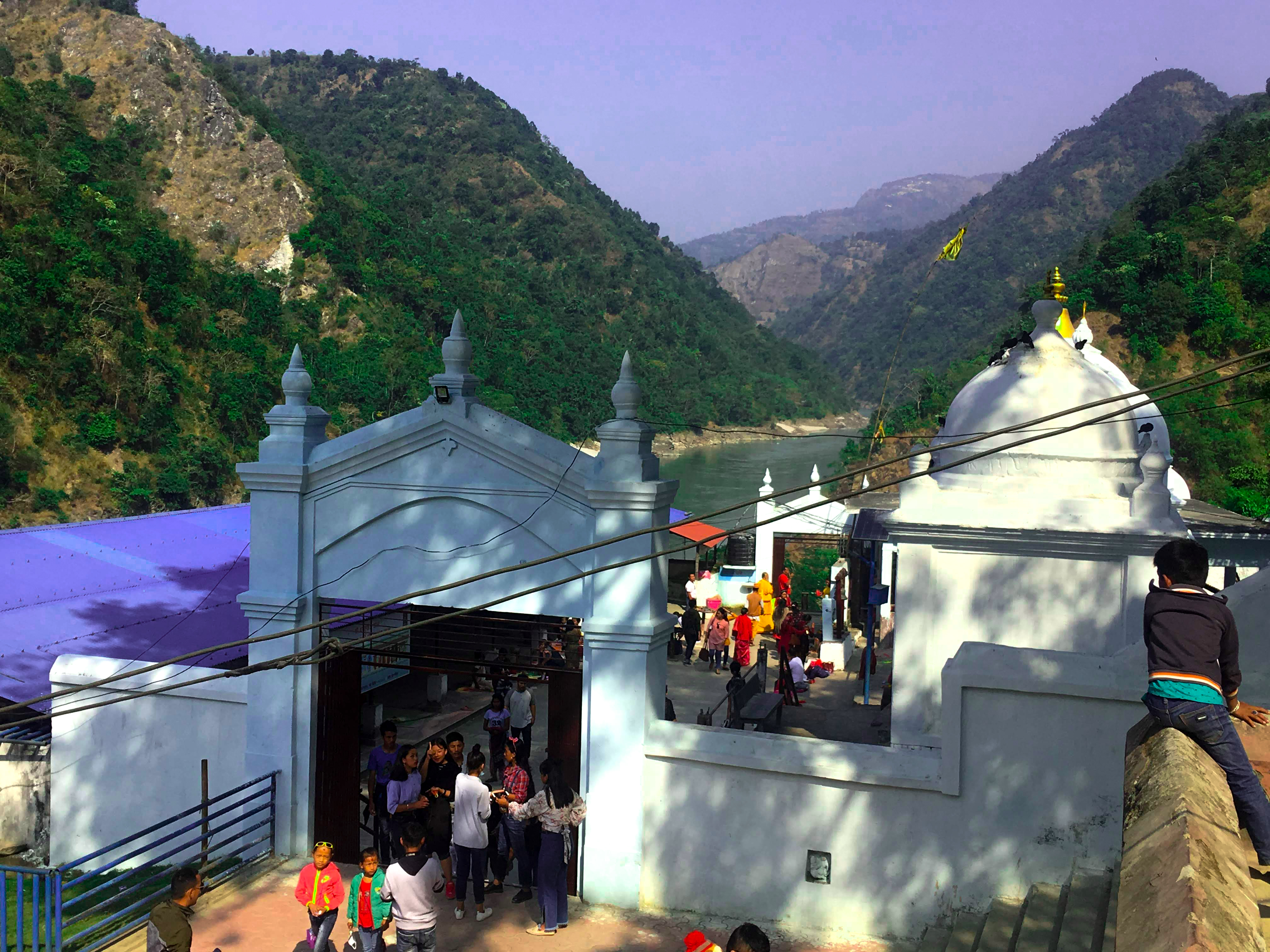
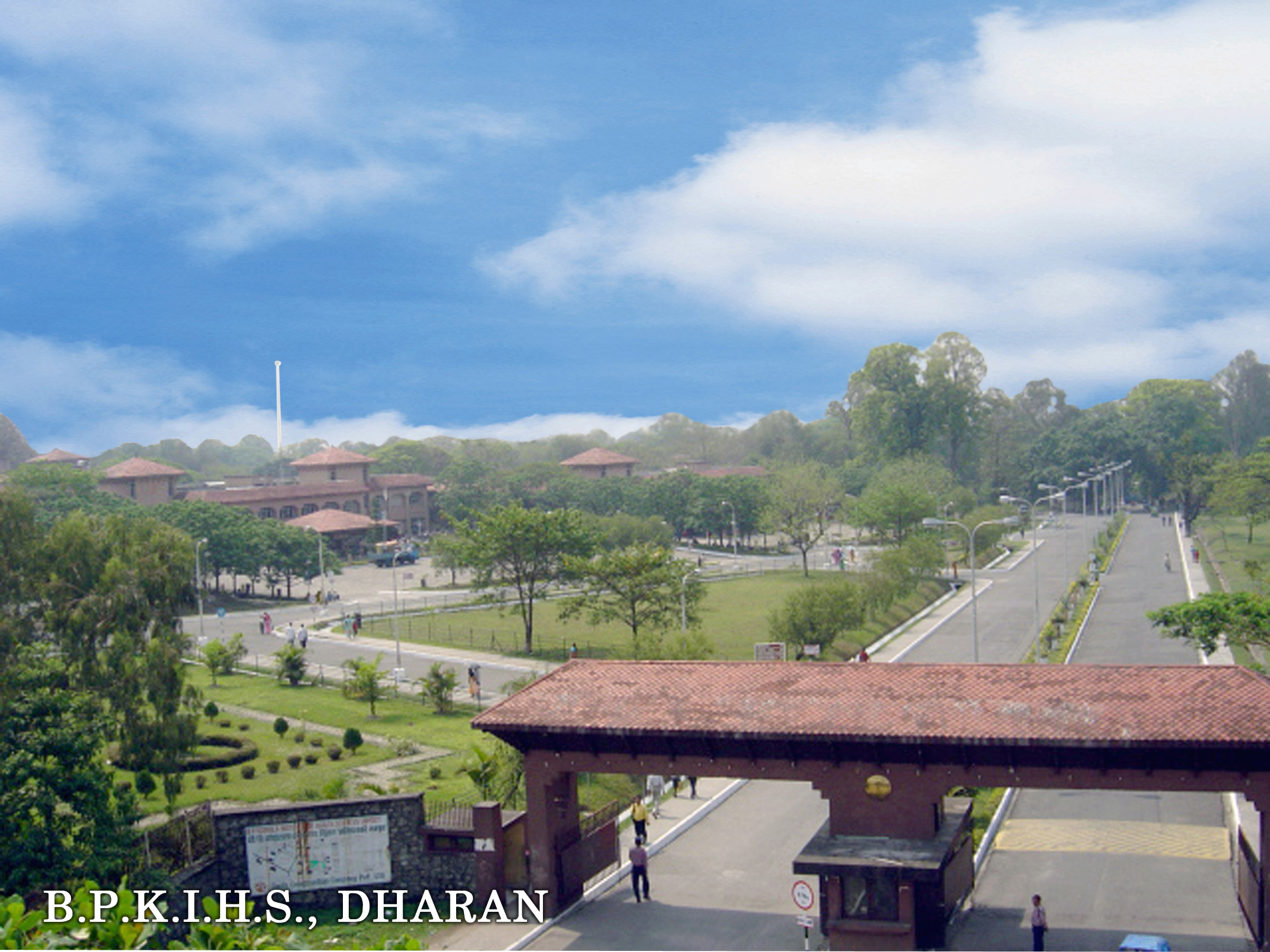
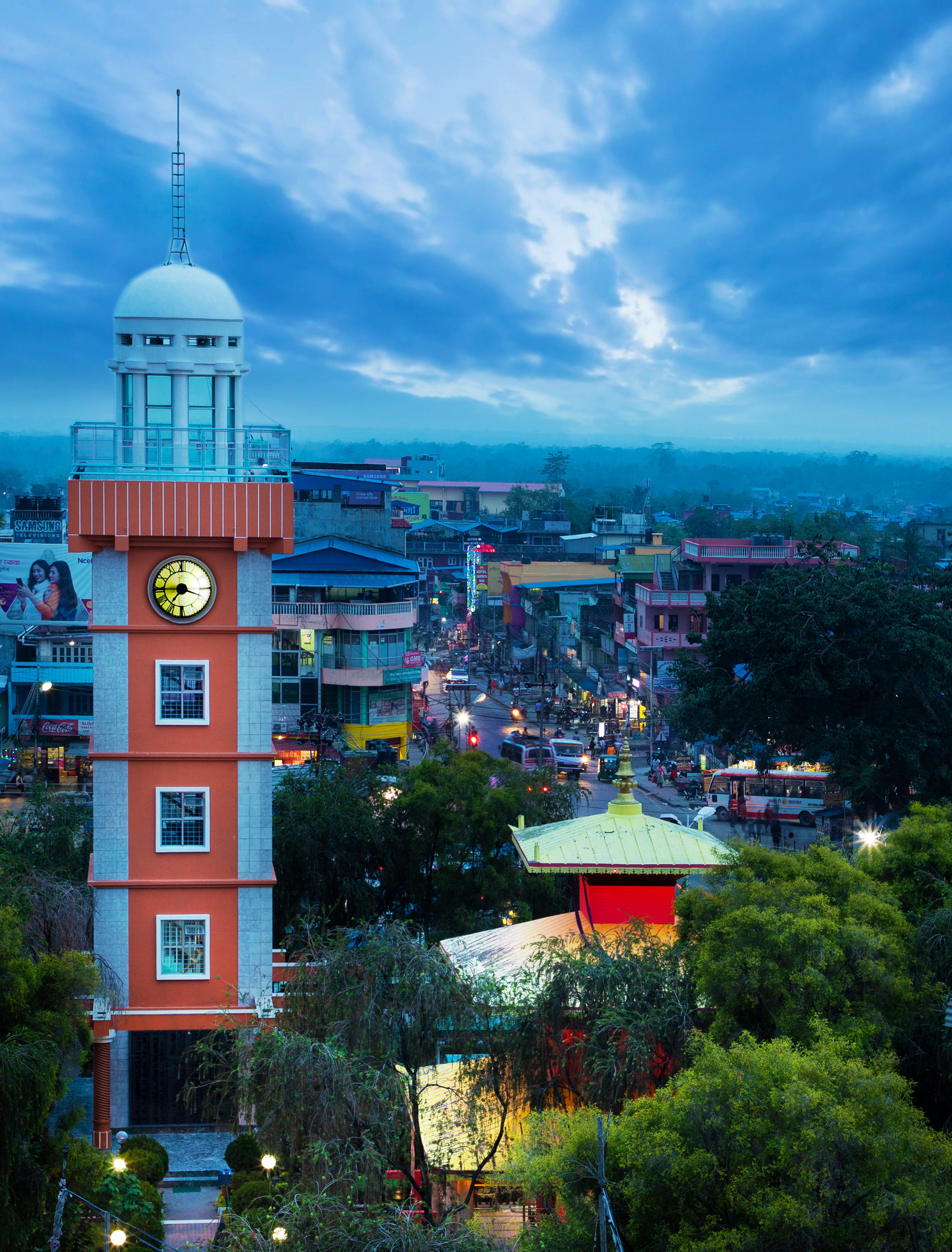
- Night view of Dharan, Itahari and Tarahara, Barahakshetra Temple, Dharan Clock Tower

- Location of Sunsari District in Province
- Country: Nepal
- Province: Koshi
- Established: 1962
- Admin HQ: Inaruwa

Government
  - Type: District Coordination Committee
  - Body: Sunsari DDC
  - CDO: Ramchandra Tiwari
  - Head: Rajan Mehta (NC)
  - Deputy Head: Kamala Dahal
  - District court: Sunsari District court
  - Constituencies: Parliamentary constituencies 4 Provincial constituencies 8

Area
  - Total: 1,257 km^{2} (485 sq mi)

Population (2022)
  - Total: 934,461
  - Rank: 5
  - Density: 743.4/km^{2} (1,925/sq mi)

Demographics
  - Ethnic groups: Tharu, Bahun, Chhetri, Madheshi, Limbu, Tamang
  - HDI: 0.5466(medium)
  - Male ♂/Female♀: 100/94

Education
  - Literacy rate: 78.1%
- Time zone: UTC+05:45 (NST)
- Telephone Code: 025
- Official language: Nepali
- Other(s) Languages: Maithili, Limbu, Tharu
- Website: DDC, Sunsari; DAO, Sunsari

Sunsari District (Nepali: सुनसरी जिल्ला) is one of 14 districts in Koshi province of eastern Nepal. The district is located in the eastern part of the Outer Terai and covers an area of 1,257 km^{2} (485 sq mi). According to the 2011 Nepal census, the population was 753,328. The district headquarters is located in Inaruwa.

The area was originally a part of Morang District but became its own district in 1962 when Nepal was divided into 14 zones and 75 districts. Major cities in Sunsari district are Inaruwa, Itahari, Jhumka, Dharan, and Duhabi. Some religious places of this district are Budha Subba Temple, Ramdhuni, Chataradham, Baraha, Bishnupaduka, Dantakali, and Pindeshor Babadham.

The lowlands of Limbuwan, present day Sunsari, Morang and Jhapa Districts was collectively known as Morang District since the time of King Mung Mawrong Hang of the 7th century.

== Administration ==
The district consists of two Sub-metropolitan Cities, four urban municipalities and six rural municipalities. These are as follows:

=== Sub-metropolitan cities ===
- Itahari
- Dharan

=== Municipalities ===
- Inaruwa
- Duhabi
- Ramdhuni-Bhasi
- Barahachhetra Municipality

=== Rural municipalities ===
- Koshi
- Gadhi
- Barju
- Bhokraha Narsingh
- Harinagar
- Dewanganj

== Geography and climate ==
Map

Climate Zone	Elevation Range	% of Area
Lower Tropical	below 300 m (980 ft)	86.6%
Upper Tropical	300–1,000 m (980–3,280 ft)	7.8%
Subtropical	1,000–2,000 m (3,300–6,600 ft)	2.0%

== Demographics ==
Historical population
Year	Pop.	±% p.a.
1981	344,594	—
1991	463,481	+3.01%
2001	625,633	+3.05%
2011	763,487	+2.01%
2021	934,461	+2.04%

=== 2021 ===
At the time of the 2021 Nepal census, Sunsari District had a population of 926,962. 8.42% of the population is under 5 years of age. It has a literacy rate of 78.10% and a sex ratio of 1064 females per 1000 males. 665,015 (71.74%) lived in municipalities.

Ethnicity/caste of Sunsari district (2021)
1. Musalman (12.1%)
2. Tharu (11.2%)
3. Chhetri (10.8%)
4. Bahun (7.54%)
5. Rai (6.65%)
6. Yadav (4.02%)
7. Kushwaha (3.82%)
8. Newar (3.64%)
9. Limbu (3.47%)
10. Musahar (3.39%)
11. Kurukh (2.77%)
12. Kami (2.53%)
13. Tamang (2.37%)
14. Teli (2.09%)
15. Other Madheshi non-Dalit (8.89%)
16. Other Hill Janjati (6.13%)
17. Other Madheshi Dalit (4.12%)
18. Other Khas Dalit (1.49%)
19. Others (2.88%)

Sunsari has huge ethnic diversity with 115 castes/ethnic groups represented. The largest communities are the Muslims and Tharu. Other communities include the Janajati Limbu and other Kirati peoples.

Languages of Sunsari district (2021)
1. Nepali (32.8%)
2. Maithili (28.2%)
3. Tharu (11.6%)
4. Urdu (7.98%)
5. Kurukh (2.69%)
6. Limbu (2.63%)
7. Bantawa (1.84%)
8. Tamang (1.59%)
9. Rai (1.51%)
10. Newari (1.40%)
11. Magar (1.14%)
12. Others (6.65%)

As their first language, 32.80% of the population spoke Nepali, 28.18% Maithili, 11.59% Tharu, 7.98% Urdu, 2.69% Kurukh, 2.63% Limbu, 1.84% Bantawa, 1.59% Tamang, 1.51% Rai, 1.40% Newari and 1.14% Magar as their first language. In 2011, Nepali was spoken by 28.8% of the population as their first language.

Religion in Sunsari District (2021)
Religion	Percent
Hinduism	74.35%
Islam	12.34%
Kirat Mundhum	7.72%
Buddhism	3.64%
Christianity	1.69%
Other or not stated	0.26%

Religion: 74.35% were Hindu, 12.34% Muslim, 7.72% Kirat Mundhum, 3.64% Buddhist and 1.69% Christian and 0.26% others.

=== 2011 ===
At the time of the 2011 Nepal census, Sunsari District had a population of 763,487.

The most spoken language is Nepali: 28.8% spoke Nepali, followed by 28.5% Maithili.

Ethnicity/caste: 12.1% were Tharu, 11.5% Musalman, 9.2% Chhetri, 7.9% Hill Brahmin, 6.6% Rai, 4.3% Yadav, 4.0% Kushwaha/Koiri, 3.8% Newar, 3.4% Musahar, 3.2% Limbu, 3.1% Jhangad/Dhagar, 2.3% Tamang, 2.3% Teli, 2.2% Kami, 2.0% Magar, 1.6% Dhanuk, 1.5% Bantar/Sardar, 1.2% Chamar/Harijan/Ram, 1.1% Halwai, 1.0% Damai/Dholi, 1.0% Gurung, 0.8% Kathabaniyan, 0.8% Khatwe, 0.6% Gharti/Bhujel, 0.6% Majhi, 0.6% Mallaha, 0.6% Marwadi, 0.6% other Terai, 0.5% Terai Brahmin, 0.5% Dhimal, 0.5% Hajam/Thakur, 0.5% Sanyasi/Dasnami, 0.4% Dusadh/Paswan/Pasi, 0.4% Kulung, 0.4% Sarki, 0.3% Bantawa, 0.3% Bengali, 0.3% Gaderi/Bhedihar, 0.3% Kalwar, 0.3% Kewat, 0.3% Khawas, 0.3% Sarbaria, 0.3% Tatma/Tatwa, 0.2% Badhaee, 0.2% Chamling, 0.2% Dom, 0.2% Kayastha, 0.2% Kumal, 0.2% Kumhar, 0.2% Rajbanshi, 0.2% Rajput, 0.2% Sherpa, 0.2% Sudhi, 0.2% Sunuwar, 0.1% Amat, 0.1% Badi, 0.1% Baraee, 0.1% Bhote, 0.1% Danuwar, 0.1% Dhobi, 0.1% Kurmi, 0.1% Lohar, 0.1% Munda, 0.1% Nuniya, 0.1% Pattharkatta/Kushwadiya, 0.1% Punjabi/Sikh, 0.1% Rajbhar, 0.1% Rajdhov, 0.1% Sonar, 0.1% Thakuri, 0.1% Thulung, 0.1% Yakkha and 0.3% others.

Religion: 73.3% were Hindu, 11.5% Muslim, 6.9% Kirati, 4.4% Buddhist, 1.9% Prakriti, 1.5% Christian, 0.1% Jain and 0.4% others.

Literacy: 68.0% could read and write, 2.0% could only read and 29.9% could neither read nor write.

== Former VDCs ==
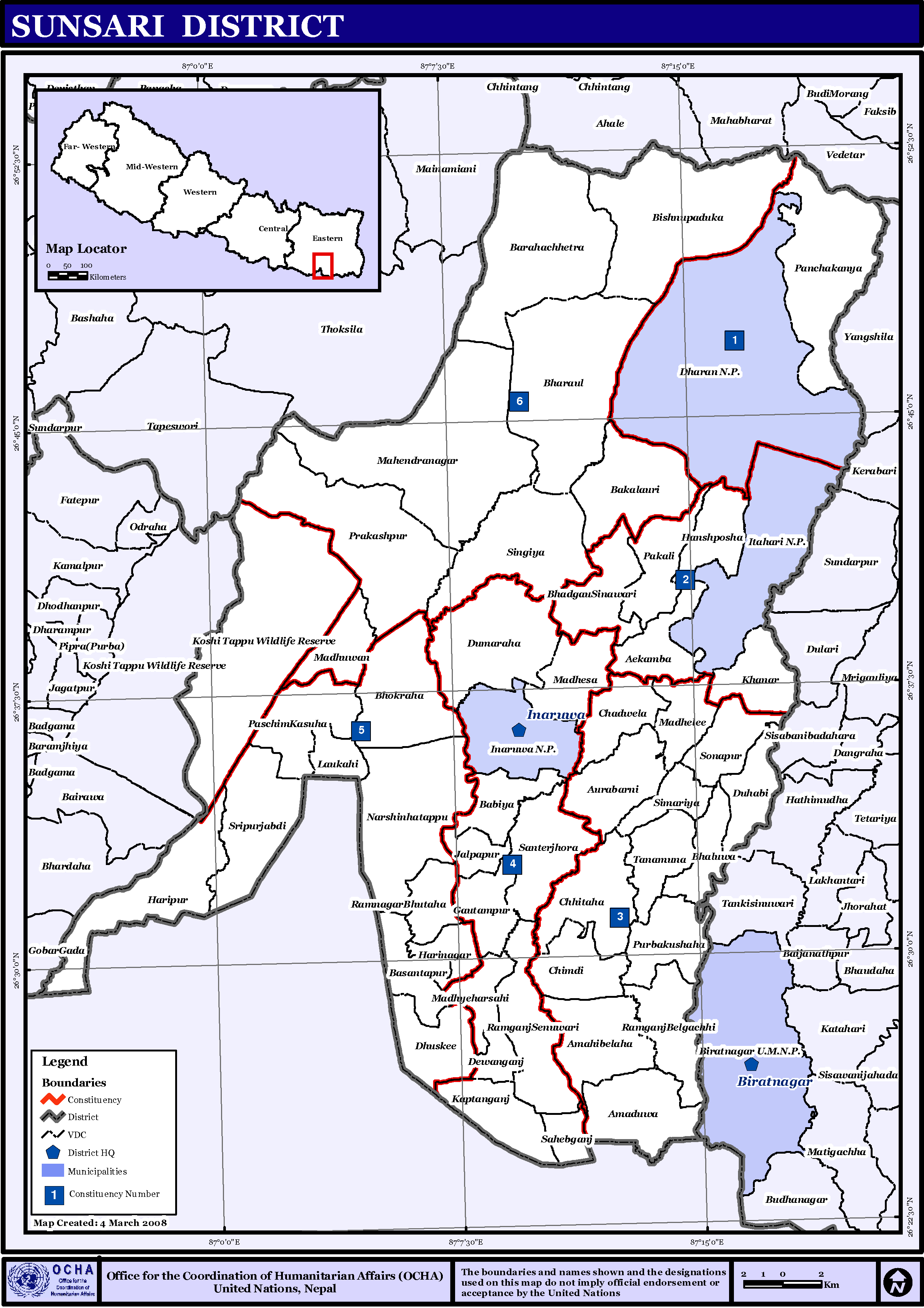
Map of the VDCs in Sunsari District

- Amaduwa
- Amahibelha
- Aurabani
- Bakalauri
- Barahachhetra
- Basantapur
- Bhadgaun Sinawari (now Ramdhuni-Bhasi Municipality)
- Bhaluwa (now Duhabi-Bhaluwa Municipality)
- Bharaul VDC
- Bhokraha
- Bishnupaduka (now Dharan Municipality)
- Chadwela
- Chhitaha
- Chimdi
- Dewanganj
- Dharan Municipality
- Duhabi-Bhaluwa Municipality
- Dumaraha
- Gautampur
- Ghuski
- Harinagar
- Haripur
- Inaruwa Municipality
- Itahari Municipality
- Jalpapur
- Kaptanganj
- Laukahi
- Madheli
- Madhesa
- Madhuwan
- Madhyeharsahi
- Mahendranagar
- Narshinhatappu
- Panchakanya (now Dharan Municipality)
- Paschim Kasuha
- Prakashpur
- Purbakushaha
- Ramdhuni-Bhasi Municipality
- Ramganj Belgachhi
- Ramganj Senuwari
- Ramnagar Bhutaha
- Sahebgunj
- Satterjhora
- Simariya
- Singiya (now Ramdhuni-Bhasi Municipality)
- Sonapur
- Sripurjabdi
- Tanamuna

== See also ==
- Zones of Nepal
- Koshi Premier League
- 2025 Koshi Premier League
