= Nepalese protests =

Nepalese protests may refer to:

- Jayatu Sanskritam, pro-democracy protests by students of the Tin Dhara Pakshala Sanskrit School, a prelude to the 1951 revolution
- 1951 Nepalese revolution, ending the rule of Rana dynasty
- 1979 Nepalese student protests, for a multiparty system in the country
- 1990 Nepalese revolution, ending absolute monarchy
- 1992 Nepalese general strike, by communist parties against economic policy changes
- 2006 Nepalese revolution, ending the monarchy of Nepal
- 2020–2021 Nepalese protests, against prime minister K. P. Sharma Oli
- 2022 Nepalese protests, against U.S. foreign aid
- 2023 Nepalese pro-monarchy protests, for the restoration of monarchy under the last king Gyanendra
- 2025 Nepalese pro-monarchy protests, a repeat of the 2023 protests
- 2025 Nepalese Gen Z protests, against nepotism, corruption and social media ban

== See also ==
- Nepalese democracy movement (20th century–2008), for abolishing monarchy
- Madhesh movement, 21st-century protests for Madhesi rights in Nepal
- Guthi bill, 2019 land reform bill withdrawn after protests
