= 2025 Nepalese pro-monarchy protests =

2025 Pro-monarchists protest
- Rally of pro-monarchists protest
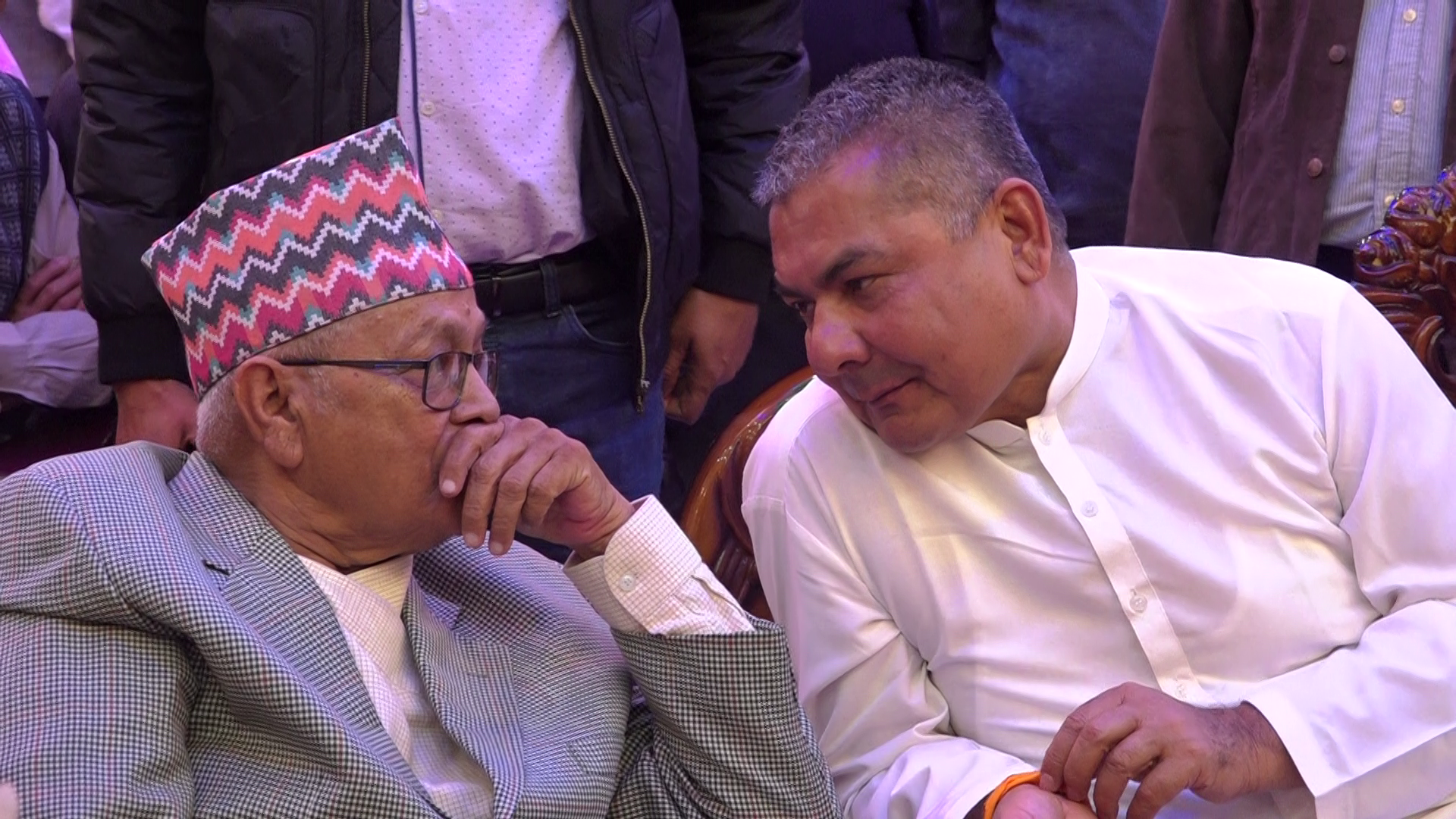
- Image of pro monarchy leaders Nabaraj Subedi and Durga Prasai
- Date: 28 March 2025; 11.25am – (GMT+5:45)
- Location: Tinkune, Baneshwar, Kathmandu
- Goals: Restoration of the constitutional Hindu monarchy
- Status: Ended: Added curfew.

Parties
(Nepal) Pro-monarchy protestors: Joint People's Movement Committee; Rastriya Prajatantra Party	Government of Nepal: Nepali Army; Communist Party of Nepal (Unified Socialist)

Lead figures
Nabaraj Subedi; Durga Prasai	

Casualties
- Deaths: 2
- Injuries: 110+
- Arrested: 110+
- Damage: Offices of Kantipur TV channel and Annapurna Post newspaper, office of CPN-Unified Socialist Party, 14 houses, several vehicles

The 2025 Nepalese pro-monarchy protests were held in Tinkune, Kathmandu and it's nearby locations led by monarchists Durga Prasai and Nabaraj Subedi advocating for the restoration of the old Kingdom of Nepal. On 28 March 2025, thousands demonstrated in the capital city, Kathmandu, in favor of restoring the monarchy with the former King Gyanendra Bir Bikram Shah as its head.

== Background ==
On 19 February 2025, a public holiday commemorating the 1951 Revolution, former King Gyanendra Shah delivered a video speech which discussed widespread frustrations with the ruling communist government, remarking that “the people are tired of endless instability and corruption” and urging citizens to “support us for the prosperity and progress of the country.” While he stopped short of explicitly calling for a restoration of the monarchy, his emphasis on unity and sacrifice was interpreted by some as hinting at a possible royal revival. Following this speech, there has been an uptick in pro-monarchy protests and activism.

Some in Nepal have been frustrated with the current federal republic government. In the past 17 years from the abolition of the monarchy, there have been 13 government formations. The country continues to face challenges of governmental instability, corruption and struggling economy.

In the recent years, the popularity of the pro-monarchy sentiments has been increased gradually. According to a nationwide survey conducted by Himalmedia in 2024, suggests that nearly half of the people favour "the reversal of the country’s secular status and reinstatement of the Hindu state".

== Timeline ==
On 9 March 2025, thousands of supporters welcomed former King Gyanendra Shah as he arrived at Tribhuvan International Airport in Kathmandu. A spokesperson for the pro-monarchy Rastriya Prajatantra Party stated the turnout "shows how frustrated the people are with the present government, and they are in search of an alternative to the present system." The arrival of the former King in the city took place amidst of tight security.

After the arrival of the former King Gyanendra Shah at the airport, thousands of supporters descended on the road of the capital city Kathmandu to escort him to his residence. Some estimates range from thousands to over ten thousand demonstrators present, monarchy supporters claimed that their number was around four lakhs (400,000). In the rally at least 1,000 police personnel and 400 traffic police were deployed to maintain law and order. No violence was reported in the rally.

During the rally demonstrators were seen carrying Nepalese flags, and some were seen carrying posters of the chief minister Yogi Adityanath of the Indian state of Uttar Pradesh. The display of the poster of Yogi Adityanath in the rally sparked controversy.

Some pro-monarchy hacker groups had attacked several domestic websites in support of the protest. A group titled Hacktivist Nepal had defaced the official websites of Nepal's Survey Department (dos.gov.np) and Department of Customs (customs.gov.np), with the defaced pages displaying a photo of King Birendra, the former king of Nepal along with the text "Raja Aau, Desh Bachau" (Bring Back the King, Save the Nation) and an attached audio of Nepal's former national anthem Shriman Gambhir. Additionally the website of the District Forest Office of Sunsari was also hacked.

=== Impact ===
The CPN (Maoist Centre) suspended its month-long campaign in the Teria-Madhesh region in response to the intensified activities of the pro-monarchy protestors in the capital. The current prime minister K. P. Sharma Oli as well as other top political leaders like Sher Bahadur Deuba have condemned and criticized the pro-monarchy movement. They have also challenged the former king Gyanendra Shah to take part in election and prove his popularity in the established democratic system of the nation.

After the pro-monarchy demonstrations in the capital, the Kathmandu district administration office enforced a two-month prohibitory order in the key areas of the government. According to the order, public gatherings of more than five persons has been banned including hunger strikes, demonstrations, protests and rallies.

On 11 March 2025, the topic of the pro-monarchy movement in the capital was discussed at the House of Representatives. The main opposition leader of CPN (Maoist Centre) party chairman Pushpa Kamal Dahal advised and warned "the pro-monarchy forces to seek their space within the democratic set-up otherwise a harsh revolution will be a response to them".

==== Formation of Joint People's Movement Committee ====
The monarchists formed an organization on 27 March 2025 called the Joint People’s Movement Committee to consolidate the movement for the restoration of the Hindu monarchy. Nabaraj Subedi was made the leader of the committee. The prime demand of the organization is the acceptance of the 1991 constitution by the government or amendments in the current constitution to feature a constitutional monarchy with a multi-party system of parliamentary democracy and recognition of Nepal as a unitary Hindu nation. The committee told the government they had one week to meet their demands.

Joint People’s Movement Committee
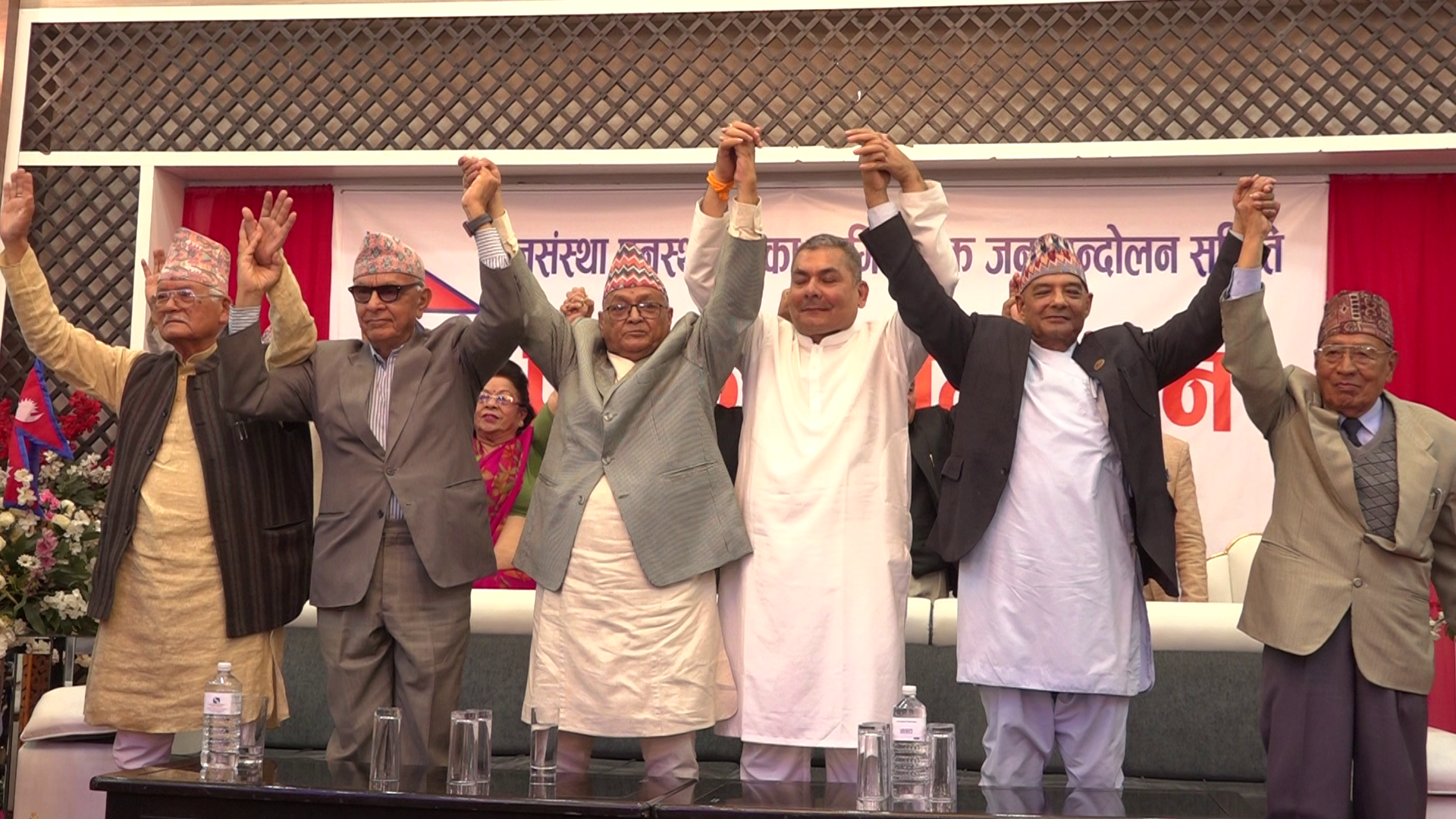
- Monarchist leaders declaring for pro-monarchy movement in a press meet in Kathmandu
- Formation: 27 March 2025; 18 months ago
- Founder: Nabaraj Subedi, Durga Prasai
- Founded at: Kathmandu
- Headquarters: Kathmandu
- Convener: Nabaraj Subedi
- Secretary: Rabindra Mishra

=== 28 March 2025 in Kathmandu ===
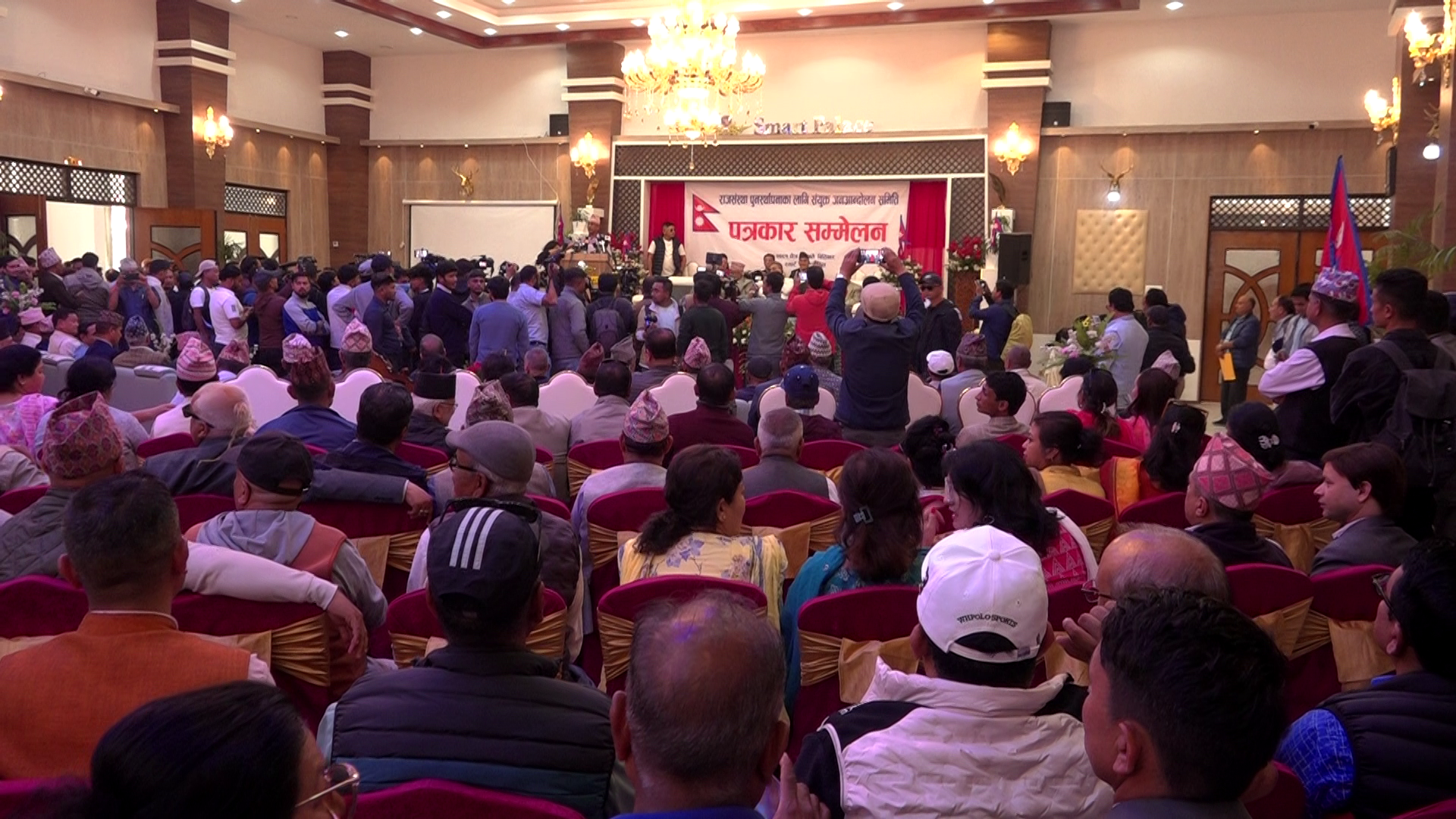
Press meet of pro-monarchists

On 28 March 2025, the groups Joint People's Movement Committee and Socialist Forum separately organized public demonstrations to counter each other, and to demonstrate in the favor of restoration of the constitutional Hindu monarchy and to maintain the present federal republic system, respectively. The protestors of the Socialist Forum gathered at Bhrikuti Mandap while of the Joint People's Movement Committee gathered at Tinkune in the Kathmandu Valley. Security was tightened in response to the demonstrations, over 5000 security personnel had been deployed by the government to take care of the protests.

The rally of the pro-monarchists began around 01:30 NPT in the area of Tinkune in the city. The crowd of the pro-monarchists tried to move towards the Parliament House where prohibitory orders were in place. Police personnel fired tear gas shells at the stage where the leader Nabaraj Subedi of the pro-monarchy movement, and other senior leaders of the pro-monarchy movement, were seated. Nabaraj Subedi was injured and his supporters rushed towards him. Following these events, clashes between the police personnel and the pro-monarchy protestors broke out. The police personnel fired tear gas, blank rounds and water cannons to disperse the pro-monarchy protestors. The protestors threw stones at the police personnel and torched houses and vehicles. Several police personnel and pro-monarchy protestors were injured in the violence. The protestors chanted the slogans like "May King come to save the country", "Down with corrupt government" and "We want monarchy back". After the conflict, a curfew was imposed at 16:25 NPT in the valley by the government and it was lifted on the next day at 07:00 NPT. The Nepalese Army were called to enforce the curfew. Over hundred of protestors were arrested by the police personnel. The police personnel also arrested five royalist leaders Ravindra Mishra, Dhawal Shamsher Rana, Swagat Nepal, Santosh Tamang and Shepherd Limbu. The convener Nabaraj Subedi of the Joint People's Movement Committee, was put under house arrest. Similarly the Nepalese police began searching for another prominent pro-monarchist leader, Durga Prasai, for arrest.

Two people died and forty five people were injured in the violent clashes between police personnel and protestors. One of the dead was a protestor and the other was a journalist for the news channel Avenues Television. The office of the CPN-Unified Socialist party at Baneshwor was attacked. Similarly the offices of Kantipur Television and Annapurna Post newspaper were also attacked and vandalised by the protestors. The protestors also looted the Bhatbhateni Supermarket at Chabahil.

After the eruption of the violent clashes in the capital, the Nepalese prime minister K. P. Sharma Oli called an emergency cabinet meeting to discuss the security situation.

The second protest, which was against the pro-monarchy movement led by the Socialist Forum, concluded peacefully at Bhrukuti Mandap in the valley.

==== Consequences ====
The political parties supporting the present federal republic system in the country have blamed the former King Gyanendra Shah for the violence that took place during the pro-monarchy protest at Tinkune in the valley. Consequently, the government of Nepal reduced the security personnel from 25 to 16 deployed for the security of the former King. In response the pro-monarchy supporters blamed the present government of Nepal for the violence took place during the protest. According to them, the present government had tried to tarnish the pro-monarchy movement.

Similarly, the municipality of the Kathmandu Metropolitan City has also imposed penalty fine of the amount 7.93 lakhs on the ex-monarch for causing environmental damage and destruction of public property in the city during the violent protest. On 30 March 2025 at the House of Representatives, the members of the ruling allies demanded arrest of the former monarch Gyanendra Shah over the violence that happened during the pro-monarchy protests on 28 March 2025; this was confronted and countered by the members of the Rastriya Prajatantra Party in the House. The Nepalese prime minister K. P. Sharma Oli has accused the former King Gyanendra Shah for the violent incidents took place during the pro-monarchy protest. He symbolised and compared the violent incidents with terrorist activities, while addressing at the House of Representatives on 31 March 2025. He also told in the parliament that the former King Gyanendra Shah would face legal action for the violence that took place during the protest.

According to media reports, the government was initiating the process of revoking the passport of the ex-monarch. The authority has seized his Nepalese passport citing the allegations on him for the violence that took place during the pro-monarchy protest at Tinkune in the valley.

The news of the violent protest affected the tourism sector in the country. Tentative western tourists considered cancelling their flights. The neighbouring state of Bihar's security system in India was put on alert due to the ongoing pro-monarchy movement. Security was increased and according to a top officer of the central security force, the guards were keeping an eye on what was happening inside Nepal.

=== 5 April 2025 ===
On 5 April 2025, pro-monarchists affiliated to the Rastriya Prajatantra Party (RPP) again continued to hold protests in parts of Kathmandu. It was led by the former ministers Pashupati Shumsher Rana and Prakash Chandra Lohani. This protest was held primarily in the favour of the demand to release the arrested royalist leaders. They also demanded for independent investigation of the violent incidents took place during the protest of 28 March 2025 in the valley. They further demanded that the medical treatment for the injured people during the violent protests should be free.

=== 8 April 2025 ===
On 8 April 2025, a demonstration of the ongoing pro-monarchy protest again took place in the valley. A large number of pro-monarchists joined the rally of the pro-monarchy movement in the capital. They demanded the restoration of the Hindu kingdom in the nation. The government deployed more than 2000 police personnel to maintain the law and order during the pro-monarchy protest rally. The demonstration of the protest was organised at Sifal Chaur or Balkhu in the capital city Kathmandu. The rally was carried out in the aegis of the royalist political party Rastriya Prajatantra Party. The prominent leaders who led the protest, also staged some speeches in the favour of restoration of Hindu monarchy and against the corruptions of the present republic system.

=== 29 May 2025 ===
On 29 May 2025, a large protest took place in favour of the restoration of the Hindu monarchy in Kathmandu. Thousands of monarchists took part in the protest carried out in the capital city. The protest was led by the Rastriya Prajatantra Party. The protestors were carrying Nepalese flags in their hands and marching into the city centre from different directions. During the protest, they shouted “Our king is dearer than lives... king come back and save the country.”

The protestors complained about the current government, lack of jobs and the living conditions of Nepalis. The protestors chanted "Bring the king back to the throne and save the country. We love our king more than our lives." According to news reports, the estimated number of protestors was 20,000. The protestors also carried traditional drums and musical instruments to chant the pro-monarchy slogans during the protest.

The protest took place on Republic Day in Nepal. Apart from the pro-monarchy protest, supporters of prime minister K. P. Sharma Oli also held a smaller rally a few hundred metres away to celebrate Republic Day.

=== 1 June 2025 ===
The pro-monarchy protest started on 29 May continued for four days. On 1 June 2025, there was a protest at Narayan Chaur in Kathmandu. The protest tried to break the security cordon and move towards Baluwatar, the Prime Minister's official residence, clashing with police personnel on the way. Consequently, the former home minister Kamal Thapa along with six pro-monarchy supporters were arrested for violating the restricted zone around the Narayanhiti Palace Museum area. According to the police official, about 1,200 pro-monarchy supporters were chanting slogans against the republican system and in the favour of monarchy at the restricted zone around the Narayanhiti Palace Museum area. The protesters said that they would continue the protest until the restoration of the monarchy in the nation.

== See also ==
- September 2025 Nepalese protests
- 2023 Nepalese Pro Monarchy Protests
