= Inaruwa Municipality =

Municipality in Koshi province

Inaruwa Municipality इनरुवा नगरपालिका
- Municipality (नगरपालिका)
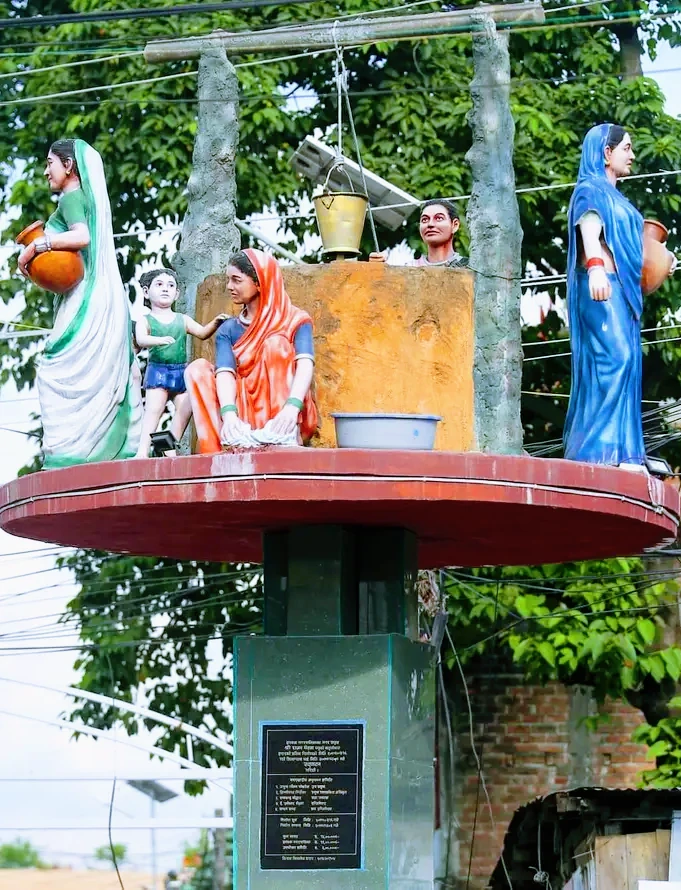
- Signature well of Inaruwa

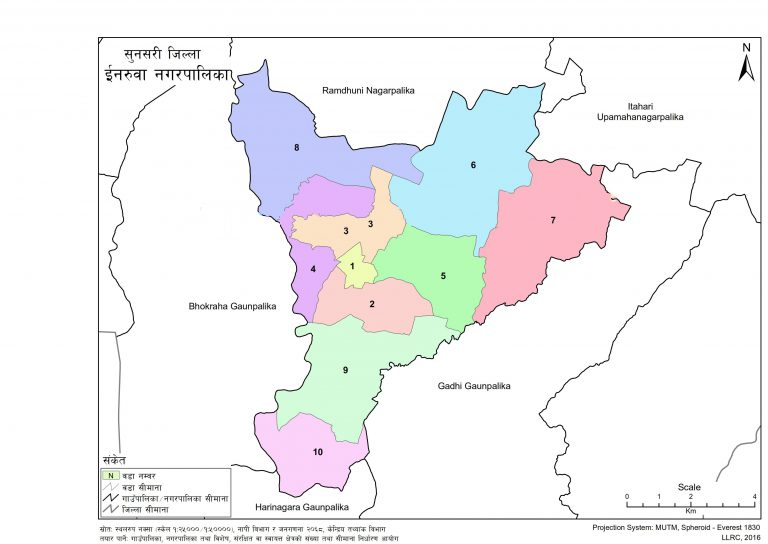
- Ward division
- Interactive map of Inaruwa Municipality
- position in Koshi Inaruwa (Nepal)
- Coordinates: 26°36′09″N 87°09′00″E
- Country: Nepal
- Province: Koshi
- District: Sunsari
- First estd. as Municipality: 2047 BS
- Named for: City of Well
- No. of Wards: 10

Government
  - Type: Mayor–council
  - Body: Inaruwa municipal council
  - Mayor: Kedar Bhandari (NC)
  - Deputy Mayor: Vinita Kumari Mehta (NC)
  - CAO: Dasrath Rai

Area
  - Total: 77.92 km^{2} (30.09 sq mi)
- Elevation: 75 m (246 ft)

Population (2021)
  - Total: 74,914
  - Rank: 63rd (Nepal); 12th (Province No. 1)
  - Density: 961/km^{2} (2,490/sq mi)
  - Ethnicities: kushwaha Hill Brahmin Teli Tharu Chhetri Muslim yadav halwai kumhar chamar etc.
  - Literacy: 75.3 %▲
- Demonym: Inaruwawasi (NP:इनरुवावासी)

Language
  - Official: Nepali
  - Additional: Maithili

Development Index
  - HDI: 0.49 (low)
- Time zone: UTC+5:45 (NST)
- Area code: 025
- Geocode: 11309
- Annual Budget: $9.69 Million (FY 2077/78)
- Climate: Cwa
- Website: inaruwamun.gov.np

Inaruwa (Nepali: इनरूवा) is the headquarter of Sunsari district that lies in the Koshi province of Eastern Nepal. Inaruwa has been a municipality since the time of Panchayat in the year 2047 BS. After 2015, it has been operating under a mayor-council form of government and is currently led by Mayor Kedar Bhandari. Spanning 77.92 square kilometers, the municipality is home to a population of nearly 75,000 residents.

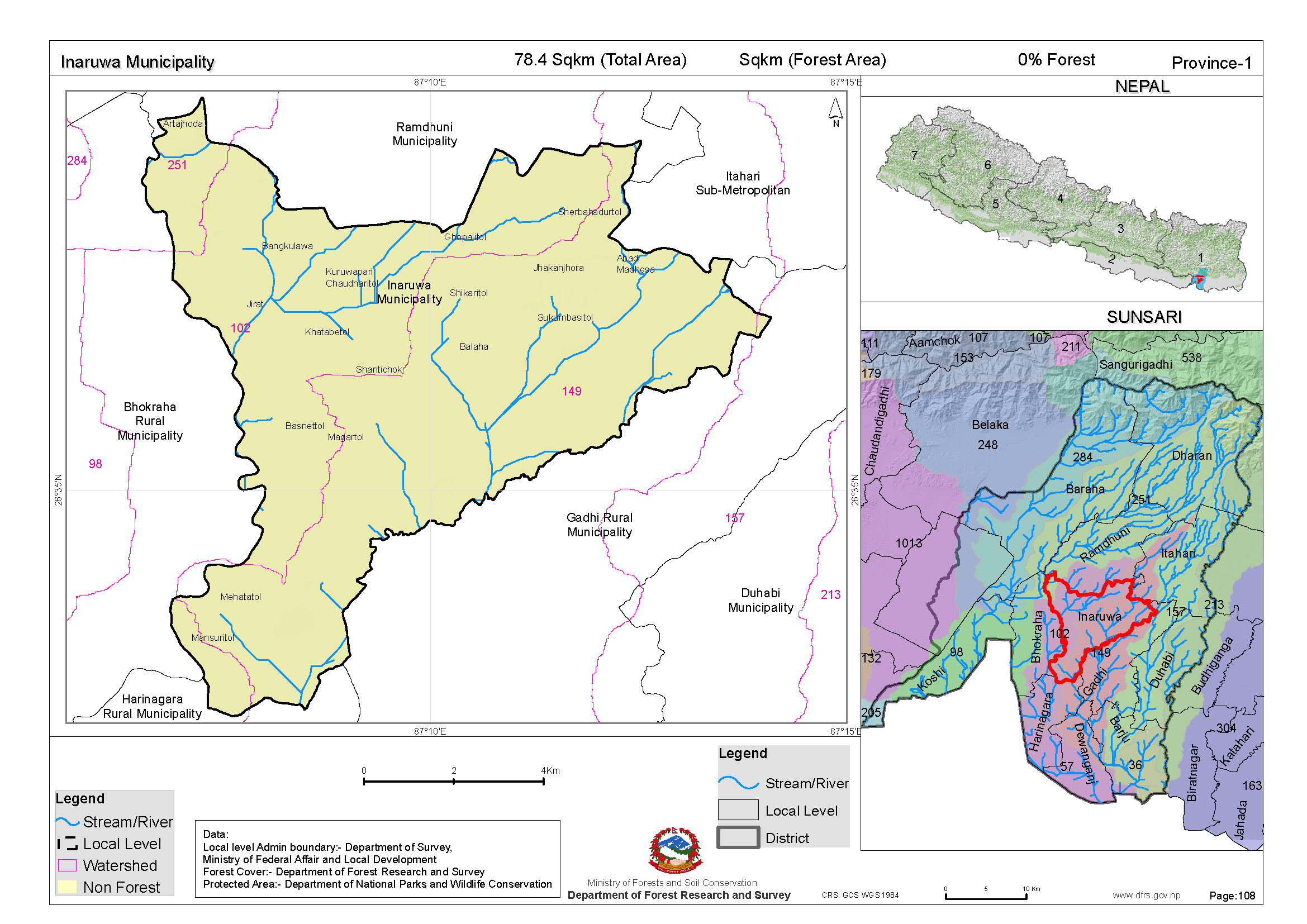

In 2015, after the implementation of federalism all over Nepal, VDCs like Babiya, Madhesa, Dumraha, Jalpapur, Chadwela were merged into this municipality. Geographically, Inaruwa is surrounded by Gadhi Rural Municipality in the east, Bhokraha Rural Municipality in the west, Itahari Sub-metropolitan city and Ramdhuni Municipality in the north and Harinagar Rural Municipality in the south. The municipality is politically divided into 10 wards.

== History ==
=== Before Annexation in Nepal ===
During Vedic Period, Inaruwa was a part of Mithila region that was subsequently annexed by King Mawrong into Limbuwan rajya along with its neighbouring districts Jhapa and Morang. Later, after the Limbuwan Gorkha War (1771-1774 AD), Sunsari, Morang and Jhapa which were under Limbuwan rule, were conquered by the Gorkha Kingdom, thereby forming them as a part of Nepal.

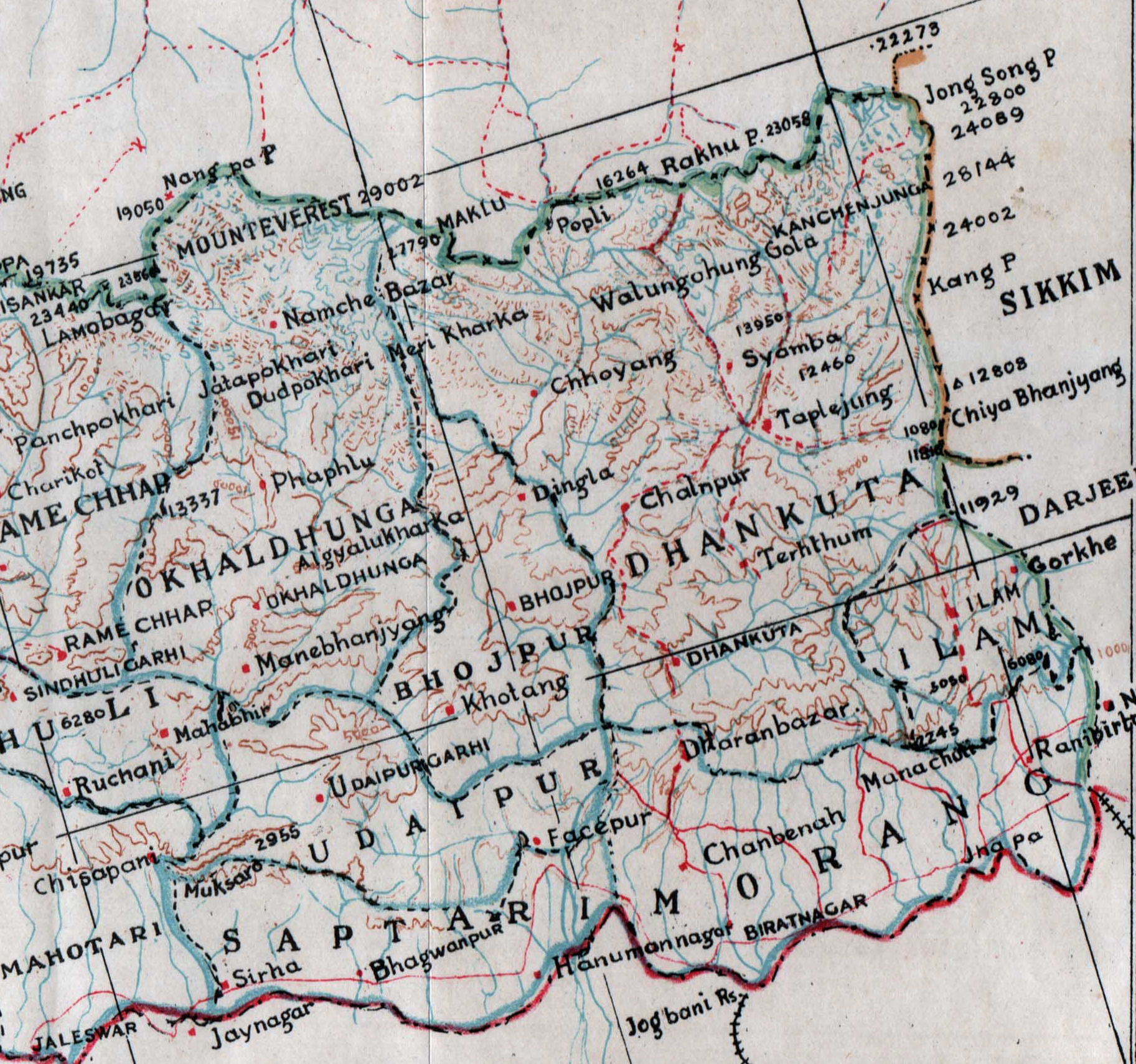
Eastern Districts of Nepal in 1942.

== Religious places ==
Religious places in the municipality include:

- Satyanarayan Mandir, Inaruwa 1
- Ram Janaki Mandir, Inaruwa 7
- Maa Bhagwati Mandir, Inaruwa 1
- Shiv Mandir, Inaruwa 1
- Maa Durga Mandir, Inaruwa 2(Behebare haat)
- Radha Krishna Mandir, Inaruwa 3

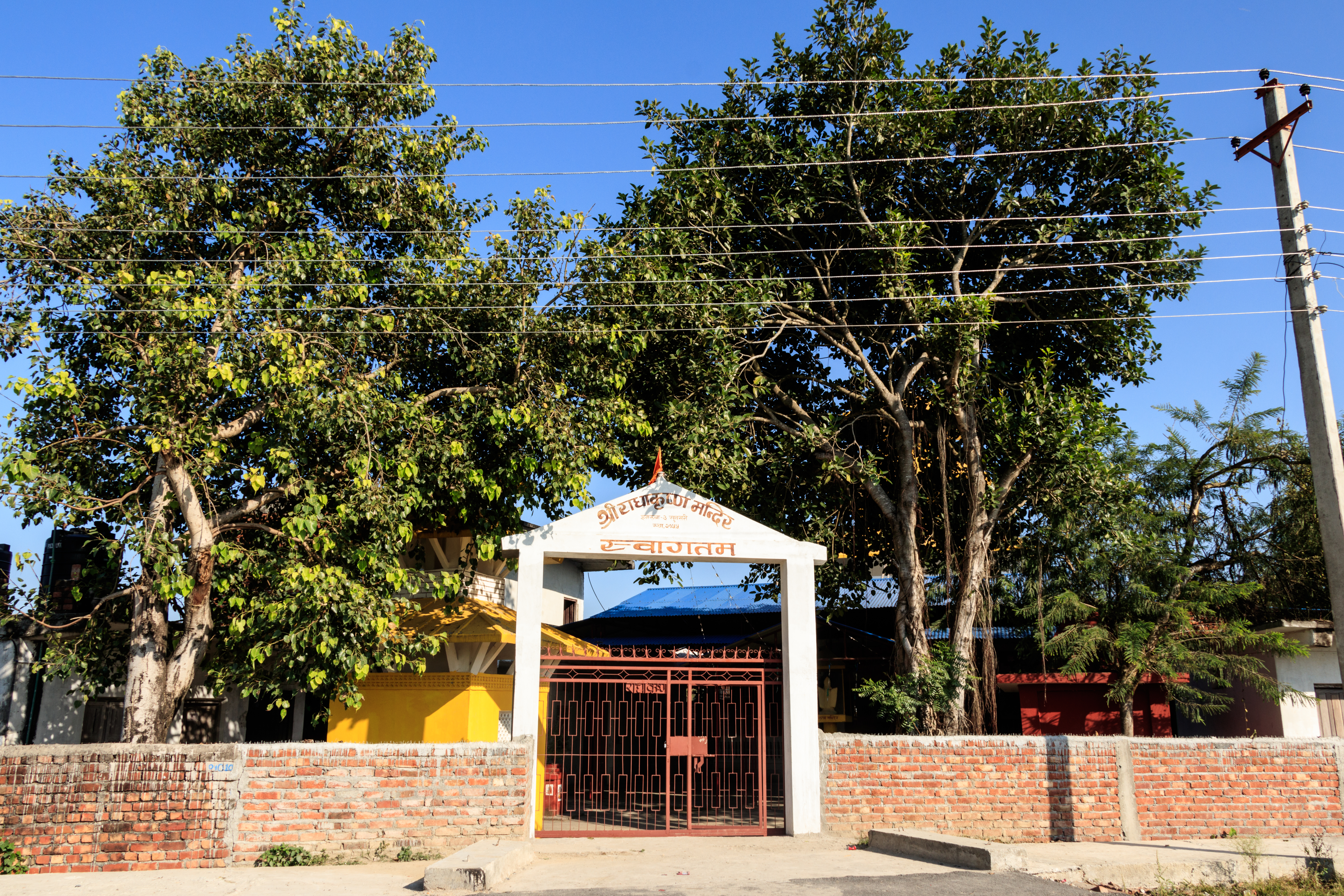
Radha Krishna Mandir, Inaruwa 3

- Hanuman Mandir, Inaruwa 4
- Latidevi Than, Inaruwa 5
- Jama masjid, Inaruwa 4
- LaxmiNarayan Mandir, Inaruwa 2
- Hatti ghoda than, Inaruwa 8
- Radha Krishna mandir, Inaruwa 2 (Pandit Tole)

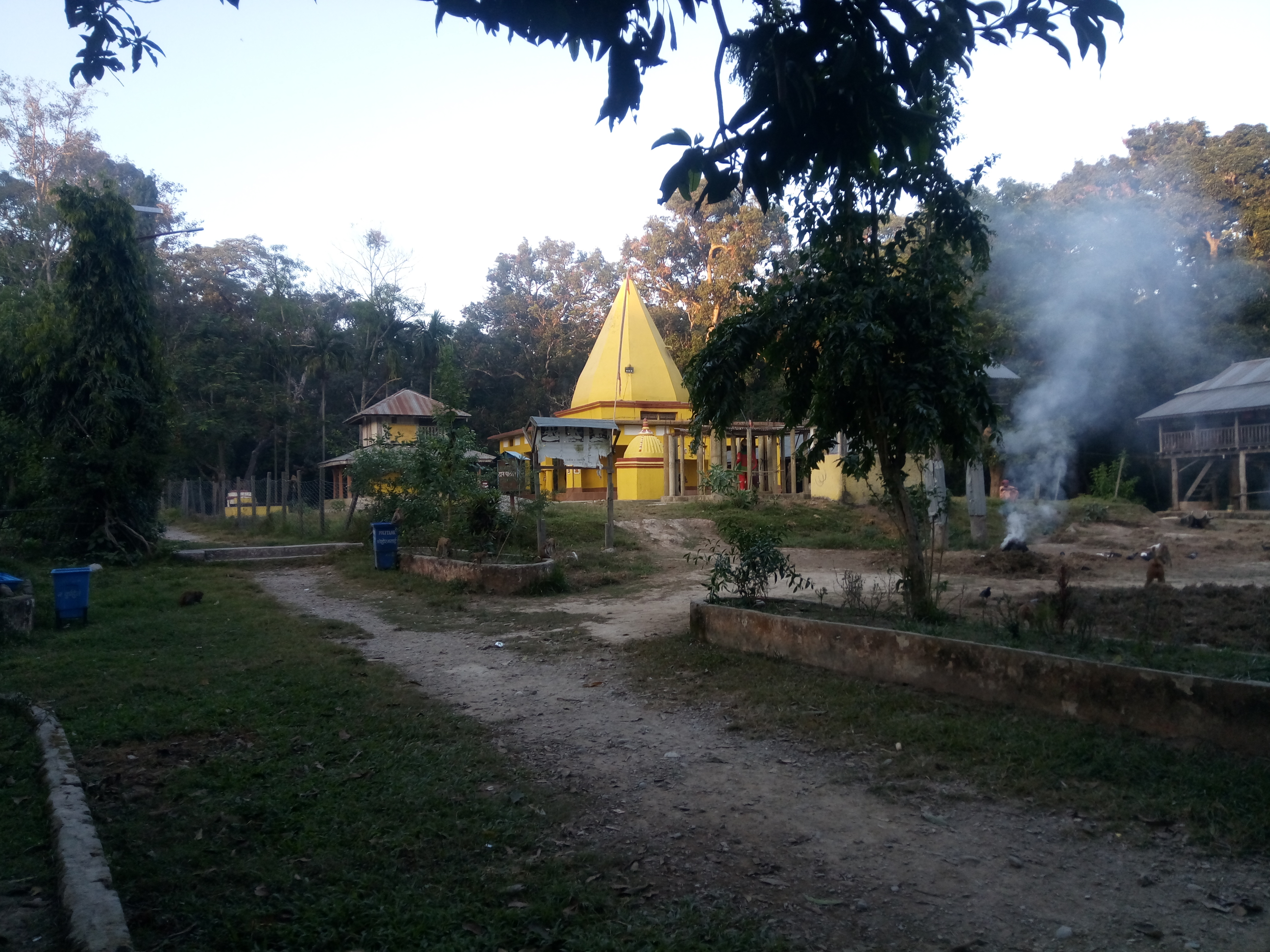
Ramdhuni_Temple

== Administration ==
A municipality in Nepal is an administrative division in the Provinces of Nepal. It functions as a sub-unit of a district.

Representatives of Inaruwa
  - Mayor - Kedar Bhandari
  - Deputy Mayor - Vinita Kumari Mehta
  - Ward Chairman
    - Ward 1 - Pramod Pokhrel
    - Ward 2 - Bishwanath Thakur
    - Ward 3 - Ramesh Kumar shrestha
    - Ward 4 - Bauwalal Mehta
    - Ward 5 - Anil Kumar Pokhrel
    - Ward 6 - Suman Thapa
    - Ward 7 - Himmat Singh Khawas
    - Ward 8 - Ashok Kumar sahu Teli
    - Ward 9 - Wasir muddin Mansuri
    - Ward 10 - MD. Khalil Aktar

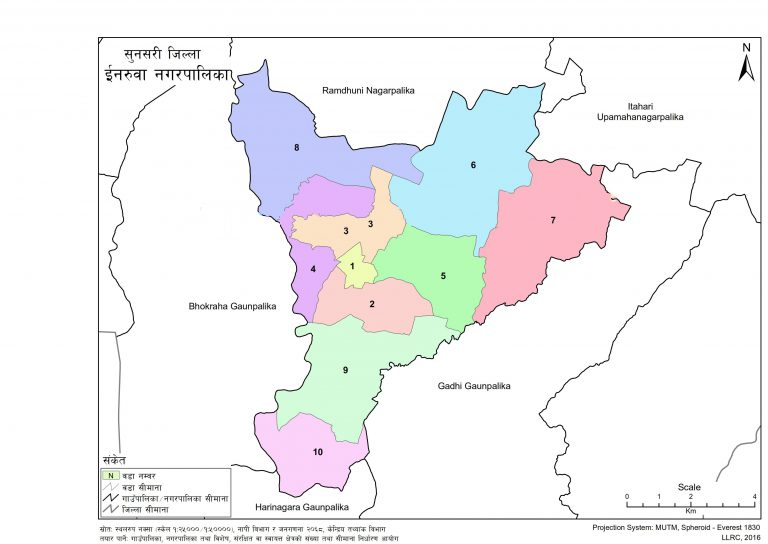
administrative division of municipality

Officials of Inaruwa Municipality
  - Head Officer - Dasrath Rai
  - Administration, Plan and Monitoring - Kapildev Mehta
    - Information and Communication officer - Niraj Pokhrel
    - Administration planning and Monitoring - Bhagwat Mehta
    - Jinsi - Kumar Niraula
  - Finance Officer -Ashok Mehta
    - Revenue Dept. - Kumari Bhattarai
  - Infrastructure Development and Management - Er. Umeshwor Mehta
    - Building and housing -Er. Sanjay Mehta
    - Disaster management - Binod Bhattarai
    - Vehicle - Geeta Kumari Subedi
    - City Police - Hukumdhwaj Karki
  - Health care department - Kapleshwor Shah
  - Education, Youth & sports - Dilliraj Niraula
  - Economic development - Jeevan Kumar Bhattarai
  - Law department - Baburam Bhattarai

Bold names are Adhikrit

== Geography ==
Inaruwa lies in the south-east part of Nepal and is within the terai plain. It covers an area of 77.92 km^{2}, sharing boundaries with Ramdhuni Municipality, Harinagar gaupalika, Gadhi gaupalika, Itahari sub-metropolitan city. It has 10 wards altogether. Inaruwa has prennial rivers like sunsari river. It is located at the elevation of 75 m (approx) from the sea level and is rich in fertile soil.

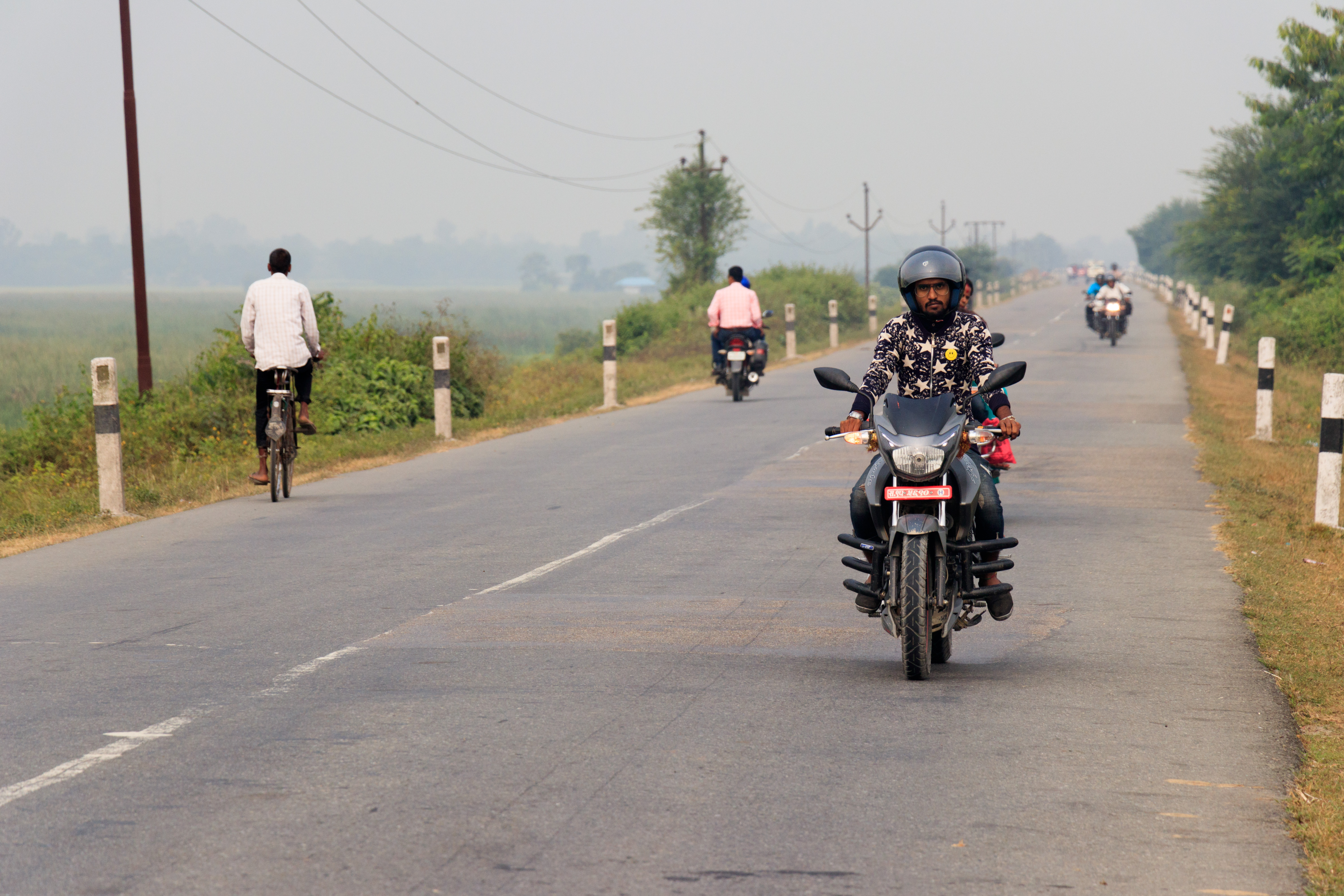
Mahendra Highway from inaruwa

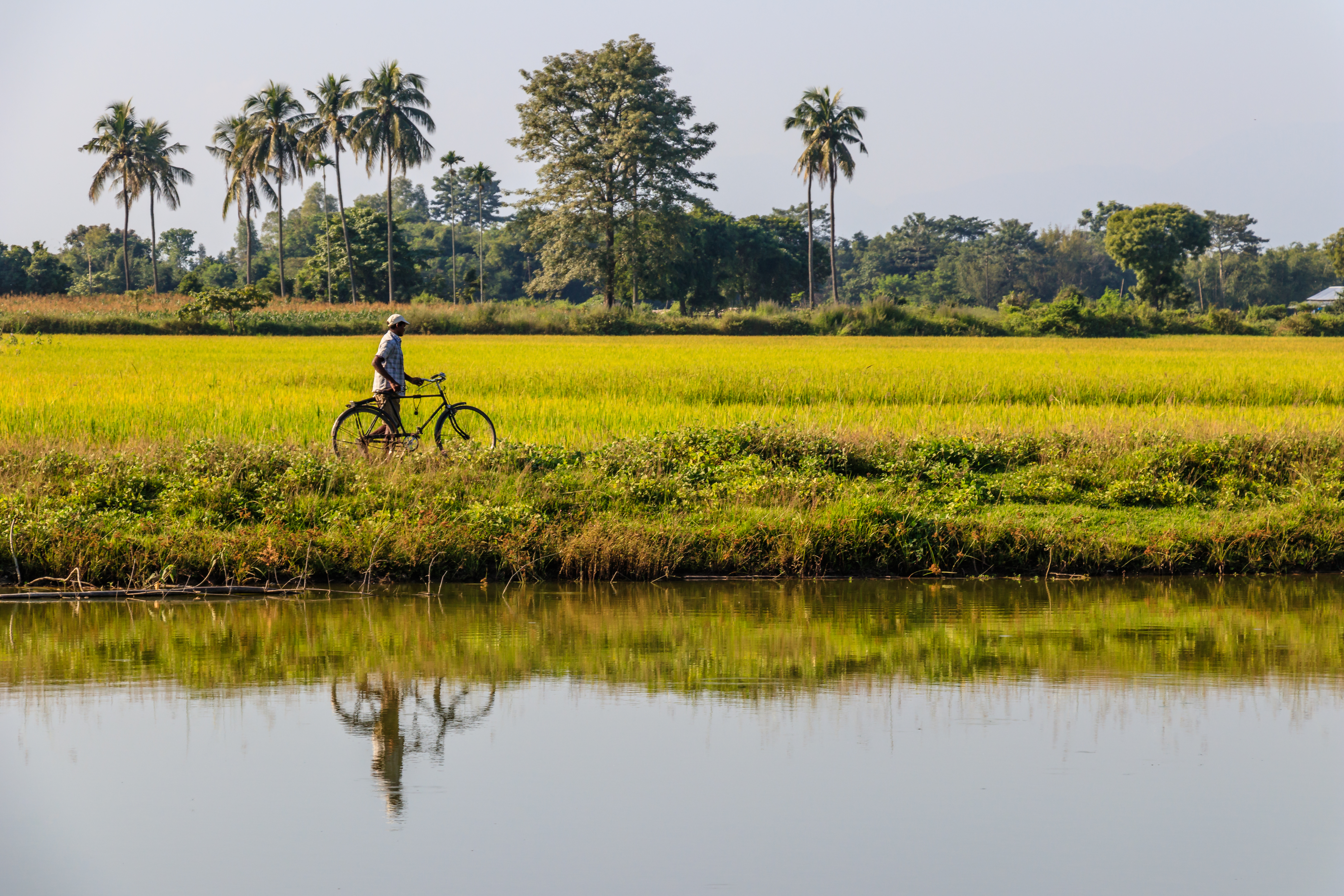
farmer observating crops field

== Demographics ==
Historical population
Year	Pop.	±%
2001	51,668	—
2011	63,593	+23.1%
2021	75,932	+19.4%
Data is based on Census in Nepal. Source: Census in Nepal

=== Census 2021 ===
According to the 2021 census, the total number of families is 16029, Inaruwa Municipality has a total population of 74914, out of which there are 36689 males and 38225 females, with a sex ratio of 95.98 male per 100 Female .In the same year, Inaruwa had 16029 households.

Languages

Majority of people living in Inaruwa speak Maithili language, while Bhojpuri, Nepali and Tharu are also some of common spoken languages in Inaruwa.

language in Inaruwa
1. maithili (47.8%)
2. Nepali (23.0%)
3. Urdu (12.0%)
4. Tharu (7.40%)
5. Bhujel (2.00%)
6. Newari (1.10%)
7. Uraw (3.60%)
8. Others (3.10%)

Religion

Religion in Inaruwa (2011)
Religion	Percent
Hinduism	81.3%
Islam	16.5%
Buddhism	0.9%
Christianity	0.2%
Prakriti	0.6%
Others	0.5%

Majority of people living in Inaruwa are Hindus, with Muslim being the second most highest population here.

Population by Gender
1. Male (49.1%)
2. Female (50.9%)

Wardwise population in Inaruwa (2021)
Ward	Percent
1	7.14%
2	9.36%
3	12.2%
4	9.239%
5	7.315%
6	9.837%
7	10.05%
8	11.398%
9	13.09%
10	10.25%

=== Ethnic groups ===
Ethnic groups in Inaruwa
1. Muslim (15.6%)
2. Hill Brahman (11.6%)
3. Kushwaha (11.6%)
4. Tharu (7.00%)
5. Chhetri (4.00%)
6. Dhanuk (3.00%)
7. khatwe (2.50%)
8. Teli (2.00%)
9. Jhangad (1.50%)
10. Musahar (1.50%)
11. Yadav (1.40%)
12. Newar (1.20%)
13. Bantar (1.00%)
14. khawas (0.90%)
15. chamar (0.80%)
16. Others (34.4%)

The largest ethnic group is Muslim, who makes 15.59% of the population, Hill Brahman and Kushwaha comes to second and third with 11.64% and 11.55% each. Other groups in inaruwa includes the Tharu (7.0%), Chhetri (4.0%), Dhanuk (3%), khatwe (2.5%), Teli (2.0), jhangad (1.5%), Musahar (1.5%), yadav (1.4%), Newar (1.2), Bantar (1.0%), khawas (0.9%), chamar (0.8%)and others various ethnic groups makes(34.40%) of the population.

Broad Caste and Ethnicity category in Inaruwa (2021 Census)
Broad Ethnic Category	Sub Category	Linguistic Family	Population Percentage
Madhesi (Terai Caste Groups)	Kushwaha, Dhanuk, khatwe, Teli, jhangad, Musahar, Yadav etc.	Indo-Aryan	47.80%
Khas (Hill/Pahari Caste Groups)	Khas Brahmin, Chhetri, Kami, Damai Sarki, Sanyasi/Dasnami	khas-Arya	23.0%
Muslim	-	Indo-Aryan	15.59%
Adibasi (Terai Indigenous Groups)	Tharu, Rajbanshi, etc	Sino-Tibetan and Indigenous people of Nepal	7.0%
Newar (Kathmandu Valley Caste Groups)	Newari Brahmin, Shrestha, Tamrakar, Newar Buddhist, Maharjan, Rajkarnikar etc	Indo-Aryan and Indigenous people of nepal	1.2%
Marwadi, Bengalis	-	Indo-Aryan	3.4%
Others	-	-	2.01%

== Health care ==
Inaruwa also has a government district hospital.

== Sports ==
Inaruwa has stadium with covered hall located behind district hospital. Inaruwa is hub for sports like volleyball, football, cricket .

The town hosts national-level sports and tournaments every year, and has hosted many sport tournaments, mainly cricket and football, including the President Gold Cup, Mayor cup, Manmohan Smirti Cup, and Sunsari Premier League. It has hosted Nepal's first night Cricket too. Numbers of night volleyball has been organised annually. Also President Cup is organised in the stadium.

== Transportation ==
Inaruwa is a city located in the fertile plain of Nepal. It is situated on the Mahendra Highway, which acts as a major transport hub connecting the city to surrounding villages, as well as the larger cities of Itahari, Biratnagar, and Jhumka. The city has well-maintained roadways, making it easily accessible by car or bus. The nearest airport to Inaruwa is Biratnagar Airport, located 25.4 km (15.8 mi) away.

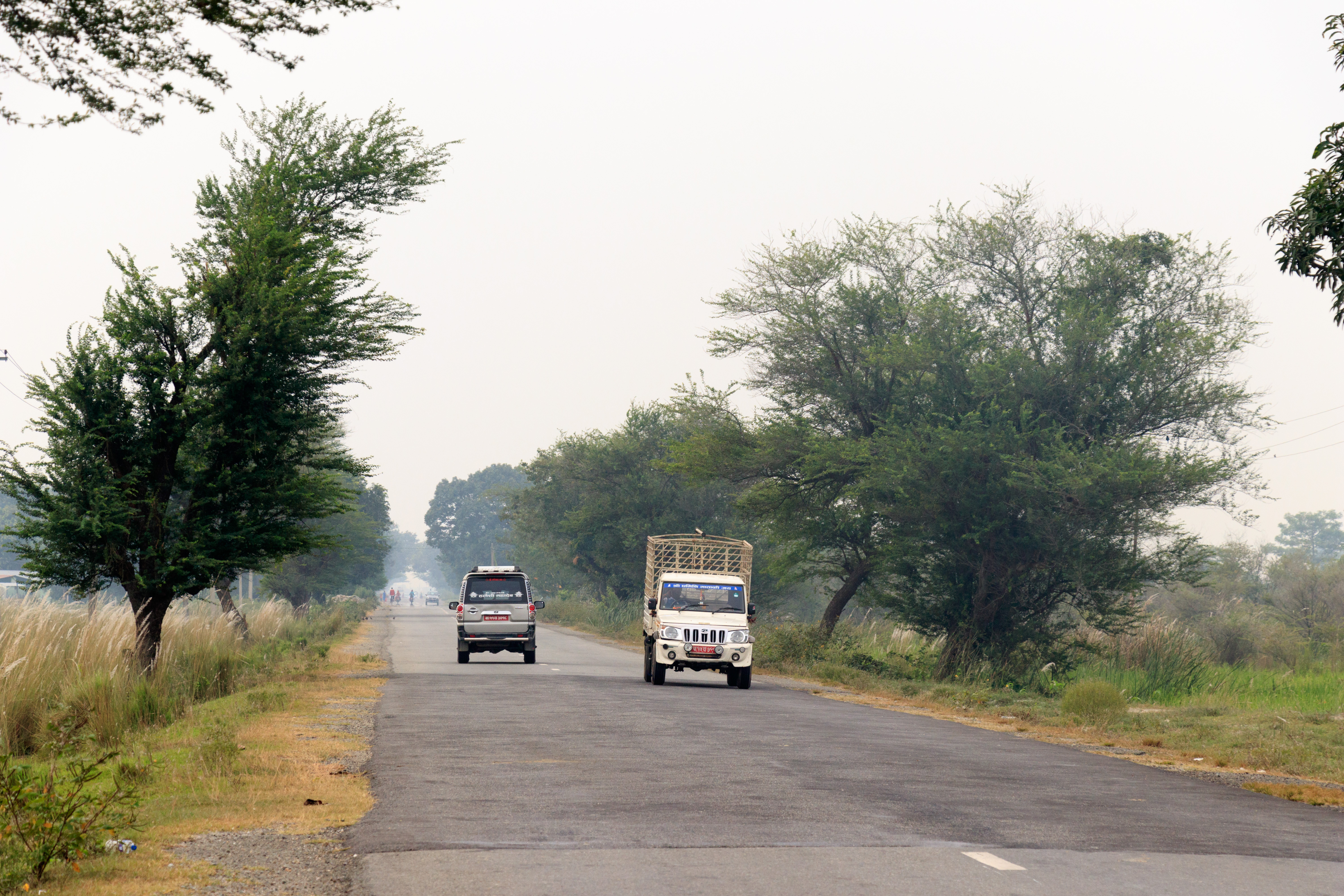
Mahendra_Highway-East_West_Highway_-_In_between_Inaruwa_and_Katan-1044

In addition to the Mahendra Highway, Inaruwa also has roadways that link it to the Indian border via Dewangunj and Bhutaha. Furthermore, the city has a newly built bus station that provides links to Prakashpur, Bhutaha and other junctions on the Mahendra Highway. This makes Inaruwa an important transportation hub for the region, connecting people and goods to various destinations.

== Media ==
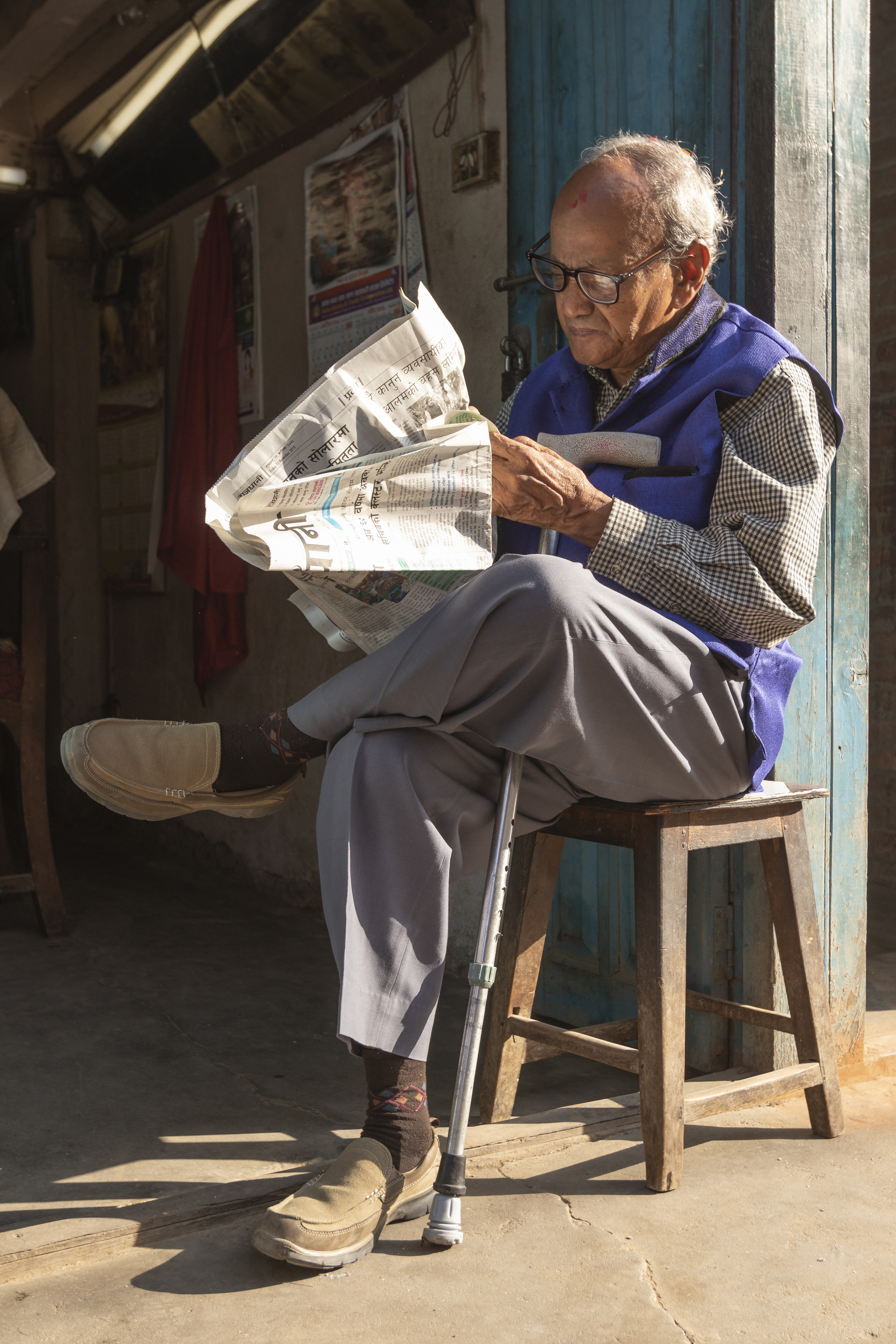
Elderly person reading news paper early in the morning

Inaruwa has local newspaper publications, FM Radio stations as well as provided by all national newspapers and television. Daily newspapers like Pratikchhan daily, radio stations like Popular FM and Advance FM, National daily newspapers like The Kathmandu Post, The Himalayan Times, the Annapurna post, and all TV channels like Kantipur Television, Galaxy News, Prime News etc. provide services. Also, few of them provide e- News services via Facebook and Twitter.

== Education ==
Inaruwa has 68 educational institutions, including playgroup, primary, secondary and higher education up to master's degree level. Inaruwa has six colleges for undergraduate and postgraduate education. It has a 60.54% literacy rate. Also, a few primary public schools have initiated English-medium education.

Schools and educational institutions in Inaruwa include:

- Bal Mandir School
- Saraswati Higher Secondary School
- Rajajee Ramjee Mahato Secondary School
- Janta Secondary School
- Sharada Secondary School

== Economic Activities ==
The major economic activities in Inaruwa are Agriculture, Local business, livestock, poultry, Milk, Mineral water production, Rice production.

== Climate ==
Summer season (Mar-Jun) is quite hot and wet. Temperature here, reaches up to 40 °C in summer.

Winter season (Dec-Feb) of Inaruwa is cold and dry. Temperature falls down up to 8-9 °C in winter.

In July–September, it receives heavy rainfall. About 2007 mm of precipitation falls annually where the precipitation reaches its peak in July with an average of 571 mm and it experiences the lowest precipitation in December with only 4 mm.

Climate data for Inaruwa (1985-2017)
Month	Jan	Feb	Mar	Apr	May	Jun	Jul	Aug	Sep	Oct	Nov	Dec	Year
Mean daily maximum °C (°F)	22.7 (72.9)	26.1 (79.0)	30.9 (87.6)	33.9 (93.0)	33.3 (91.9)	32.9 (91.2)	32.1 (89.8)	32.5 (90.5)	32.1 (89.8)	31.6 (88.9)	29.3 (84.7)	25.4 (77.7)	30.2 (86.4)
Daily mean °C (°F)	15.8 (60.4)	18.6 (65.5)	23.3 (73.9)	27.1 (80.8)	28.3 (82.9)	29.0 (84.2)	28.8 (83.8)	29.2 (84.6)	28.4 (83.1)	26.4 (79.5)	22.3 (72.1)	18.0 (64.4)	24.6 (76.3)
Mean daily minimum °C (°F)	9.0 (48.2)	11.1 (52.0)	15.6 (60.1)	20.4 (68.7)	23.3 (73.9)	25.2 (77.4)	25.6 (78.1)	25.8 (78.4)	24.7 (76.5)	21.1 (70.0)	15.3 (59.5)	10.5 (50.9)	19.0 (66.2)
Average precipitation mm (inches)	11.7 (0.46)	13.2 (0.52)	13.2 (0.52)	53.1 (2.09)	186.0 (7.32)	302.4 (11.91)	530.8 (20.90)	378.3 (14.89)	298.8 (11.76)	91.8 (3.61)	5.9 (0.23)	6.6 (0.26)	1,891.8 (74.47)
Source: Department of Hydrology and Meteorology (Nepal)

=== 2022 ===
Climate data for Inaruwa
Month	Jan	Feb	Mar	Apr	May	Jun	Jul	Aug	Sep	Oct	Nov	Dec	Year
Mean daily maximum °F (°C)	70 (21)	73 (23)	90 (32)	91 (33)	88 (31)	88 (31)	90 (32)	91 (33)	88 (31)	90 (32)	84 (29)	82 (28)	91 (33)
Mean daily minimum °F (°C)	37 (3)	36 (2)	46 (8)	57 (14)	57 (14)	66 (19)	68 (20)	66 (19)	66 (19)	63 (17)	57 (14)	48 (9)	36 (2)
Source: AccuWeather
