= The Annapurna Express =

Nepalese weekly premium newspaper

- Type: Daily newspaper
- Format: Broadsheet
- Owner: Annapurna Media Network
- Editor: Kamal Dev Bhattarai
- Founded: 2017; 9 years ago
- Headquarters: Corporate Tower, Tinkune, Kathmandu
- Country: Nepal
- Website: theannapurnaexpress.com

The Annapurna Express is an English-language broadsheet newspaper, previously published and distributed weekly but published daily from 15 December 2022, in Nepal. It was started in 2017 by Annapurna Media Network, which also owns Annapurna Post and Radio Annapurna Nepal.

== ApEx Pioneers ==
The Annapurna Express held an event named Salute on May 23, 2022, to honor 100 individuals for their contributions to all facets of life. The 50 pioneers received a token of love, while the 50 visionaries received a medal of distinction.

== ApEx Series ==
ApEx Series is a five-part detailed reporting on a particular topic. The Annapurna Express has already completed ApEx Series on Ropeways in Nepal, Climate Change, NEPSE and Domestic Violence among others.
