= Babiya =

Babiya बबिया
- Village development committee
- Location in Nepal
- Coordinates: 26.57°N 87.15°E
- Country: Nepal
- Zone: Kosi Zone
- District: Sunsari District
- Elevation: 1,100 m (3,600 ft)

Population (3000)
  - Total: 9,000
- Time zone: UTC+5:45 (Nepal Time)

Babiya was a former village development committee in Sunsari District, in the Kosi Zone of south-eastern Nepal. In 2015, it was merged with District Headquarter Inaruwa municipality. At the time of the 1991 Nepal census it had a population of 5,546 people living in 888 individual households. Major castes of this VDC include Yadav, Muslims, Shah, and Mehta.
