= Guthi =

Nepalese social organization

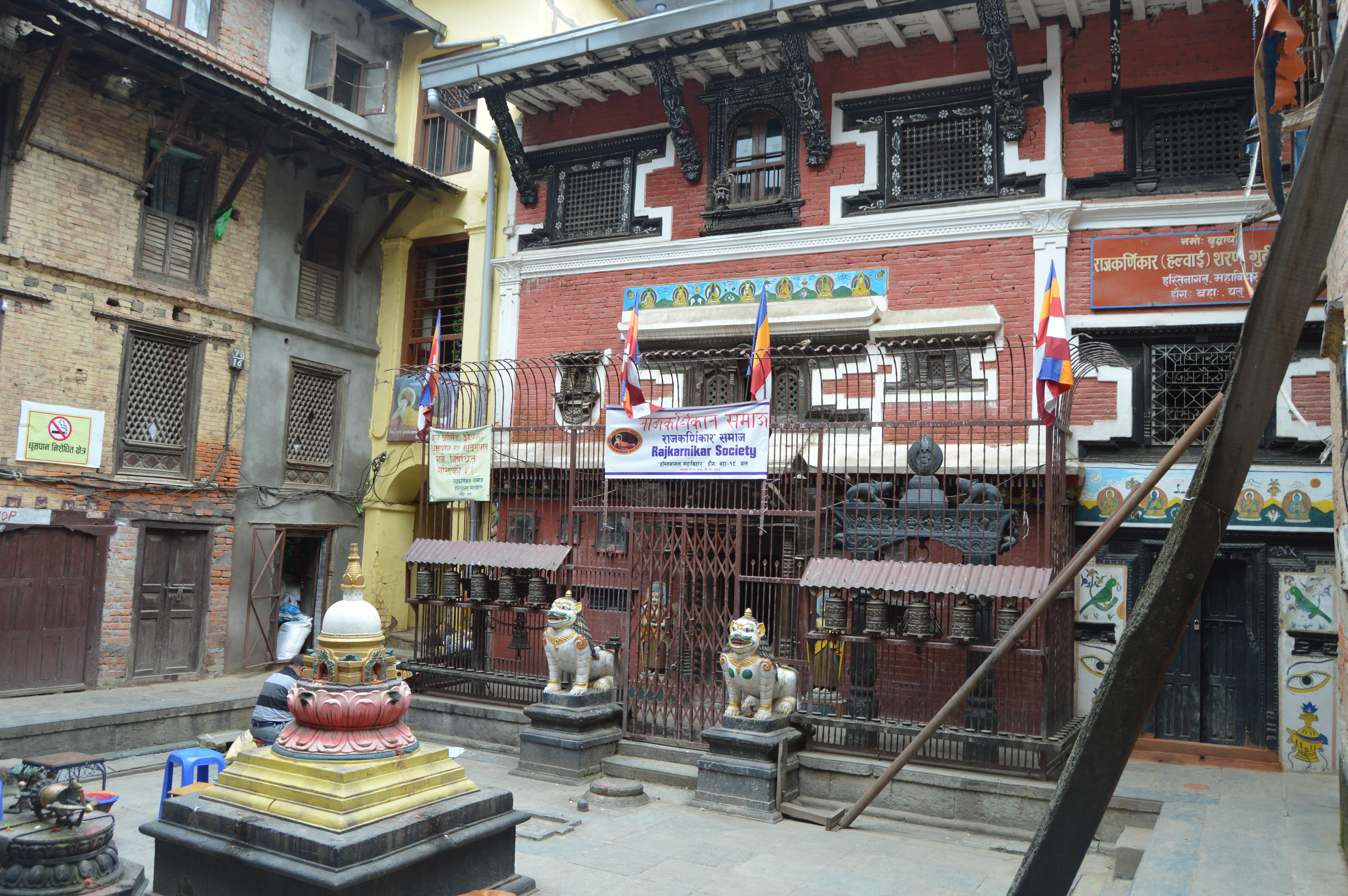
Rajkarnikar Guthi, a Guthi located in Lalitpur district

Guthi or Gosthi (Note: Nepali: गुठी, romanized: guṭhī; Newar: गुथि, romanized: guthi; etymologically from Sanskrit: गोष्ठी, lit. 'goṣṭhī') is a social system of the Newar community in Nepal. With land trusts, Guthis support the socio-economic status of their communities. The land held by Guthis is used for various projects and to generate revenue. The system began around the 5th century B.C., and most Guthis are now either defunct or a vestigial representation of their former role. In 2019, the Guthi bill—which proposed nationalizing all Guthis—was withdrawn following protests by Newars in Kathmandu Valley.

== Organizational structure ==
Guthi is a social organization prevalent among the Newars. The system is integrated into the social structure of communities. It consists of a Thakali, or the eldest person of the Guṭhī. The consent of the thakali is essential for formulating most of the norms of the Guṭhī. A member of Guthi is called a Guthiyar.

The Guthi system contains associations formed by groups of people often based on various castes. Much of the Guthi system is eroding to changes in the social structure of communities. Significant changes have also been spurred by the proposed nationalization of the Guthi system and land reform campaigns.

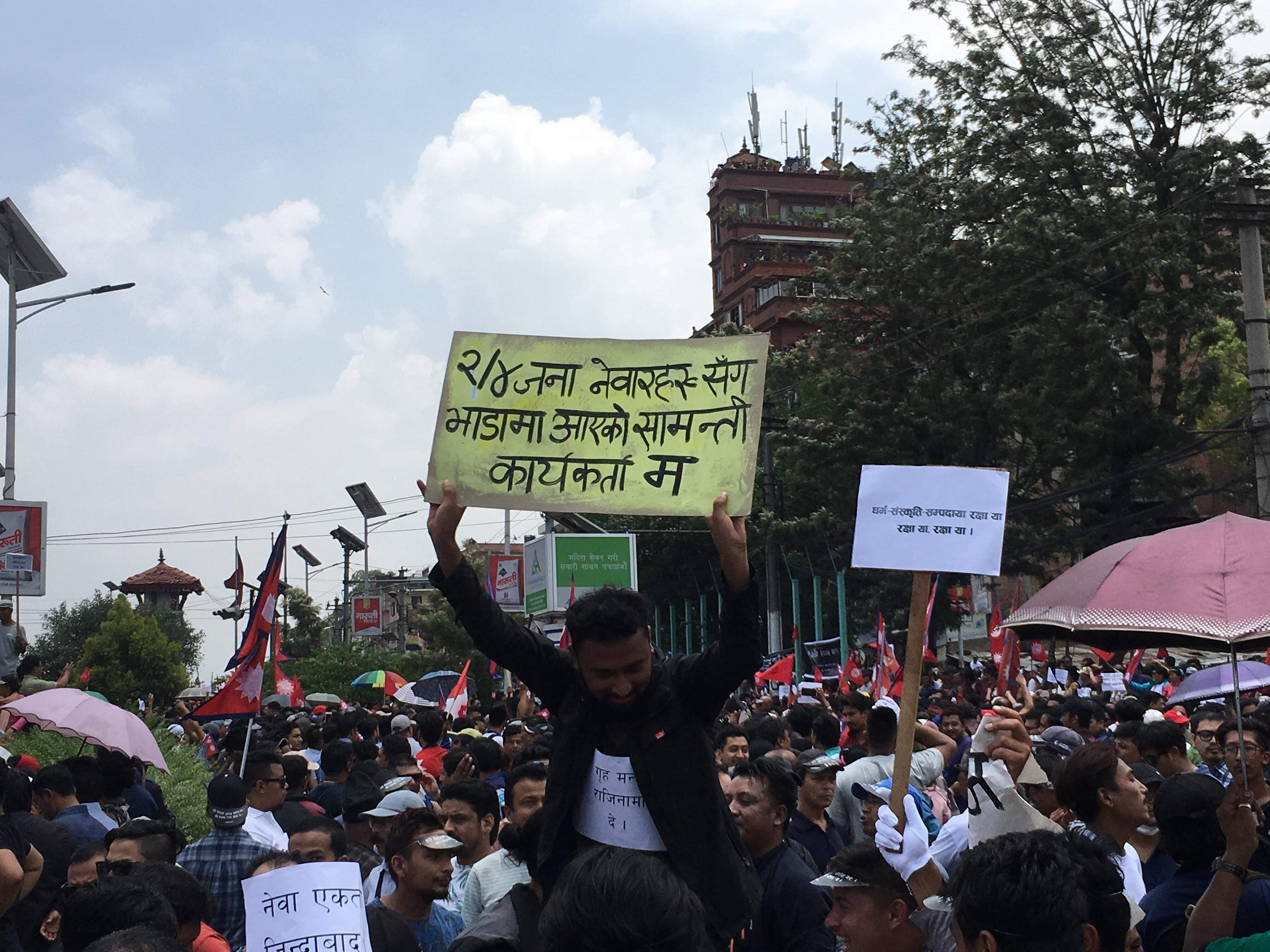
Guthi bill protest (2019)

The Guthi bill, tabled in the Upper House of the Federal Parliament of Nepal in April 2019, was highly controversial and prompted several mass protests against the bill, especially in the Kathmandu Valley.

== History and role in society ==
Guthi has been a part of the Newar social system in the Kathmandu Valley since the 5th century B.C. It is considered to have been in operation since the Kirati and Licchavi eras, with the first practice recorded in inscription erected at Pashupati Bhasmeshwar Temple, which is regarded as the oldest dated 455 inscription of Nepal.

Guthi includes a trust to which lands are donated. The revenue generated through the system boosts the community's economy and is used for various projects, including the restoration of temples, patis (rest houses), maths (priest houses), and hiti or dhunge dharas (stone water spouts). The revenue is also used for various occasions like festivals, customs, rites, and rituals.

This system was connected with the local community by tilling land and engaging groups such as masons and shilpakars (Newar natives who worked on mandir, stupas, and temples in the Kirat and Lichhavi periods). Furthermore, they carved wood, metal, and copper in temples around Lalitpur, Bhaktapur, and Kathmandu.

In Newari or Nepalese culture, donating land to the Guthi is considered a very generous deed and is believed to have a sort of religious merit. Historically, kings, royals, and ordinary people would donate land to the Guthi believing that it would bring spiritual deliverance for seven generations. Donating land to the Guthi was a status symbol in society and was highly regarded. People also endowed their land to prevent the state from confiscating it, as it was considered a great crime to confiscate Guthi land. Land donations provided space for various tasks to be carried out and a base on which regular income could be generated.

== Sources ==
- Regmi, Mahesh Chandra (1976). Landownership in Nepal. University of California Press. pp. 252. ISBN 9780520027503.
- Bernhard Kölver and Hemraj Śakya, Documents from the Rudravarna-Mahävihära, Pätan. 1. Sales and Mortgages (1985), esp. disc. on pp. 18–21.
- U. N. Sinha, Development of Panchayats in Nepal (Patna, 1973), chapter IV.
- Mary Slusser in Nepal Maṇḍala (1982).
- John K. Locke, Buddhist Monasteries of Nepal (Kathmandu: Sahayogi Press, 1985), esp. pp. 10, 14, and passim.
- Phanindra Ratna Vajracharya, "Role of Guthi in Newar Buddhist Culture” (1998 conference paper summary).
