= Nava Raj Subedi =

Nepali politician (born 1939)

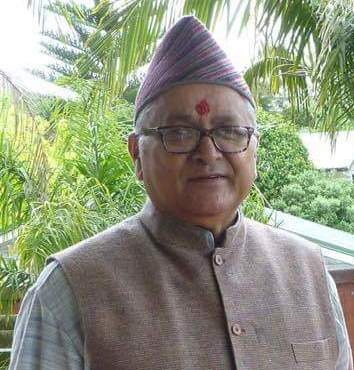

Speaker of the Rastriya Panchayat
- In office 11 June 1986 – 16 April 1990
- Monarch: Birendra
- Preceded by: Drona Shamsher J.B.R.
- Succeeded by: System abolished; Daman Nath Dhungana; (as Speaker of the House of Representatives)

Personal details
- Born: 1939 (age 86–87) Ramechhap, Nepal
- Party: Rastriya Prajatantra Party (until March, 2025)

Nava Raj Subedi (born 1939) is a Nepali politician who served as the Chairperson of Rastriya Panchayat of Nepal in panchayat era.

== Political career ==
Subedi started his political career by being elected as the first President of Tribhuvan University Students Union in 1960. He joined the party less Panchayat system since its inception, and was elected continuously from 1962 to 1990 as member of the Rastriya Panchayat representing the Sindhupalchowk district.

He served the country for more than 30 years heading various ministries and public posts:

- 1962 district president of Sindhupalchowk
- 1967 Assistant Minister, Ministry of Finance
- 1968 State Minister, Ministry of Home and Panchayat
- 1968 Minister, Ministry of Industry of commerce
- 1969 Minister, Ministry of Industry, Commerce, Works, Communication, Transport, Forest and Water Power.
- 1978 Chairman, (Rastriya Panchayat) Finance committee
- 1979 Minister, Ministry of Home and Panchayat
- 1980 Chairman of public finance committee of parliament
- 1981 Minister, Ministry of Home and Panchayat

== Awards ==
- King Birendra Investiture Medal (24 February 1975)
- Order of Gorkha Dakshina Bahu (First class), 1990
- Order of Tri Shakti Patta (First Class), 1986
- Daibi Prakop Uddhar Padak, 1989
- 3rd SAARC Summit Commemorative Medal, 1988
- Birendra-Aishwarya Sewa Padak (King Birendra-Queen Aishwarya Service Medal), 2002.

== Books written ==
- इतिहासको एक कालखण्ड (Itihasko ek kaalkhanda)
