= 2022 Nepalese protests =

Protest

2022 Nepalese protest
- Date: 20 February 2022
- Location: Kathmandu, Nepal
- Result: Police used tear gas and water cannons to disperse protesters

Parties
Protesters	Nepalese government

On 20 February 2022, in the Nepalese capital, Kathmandu, people protested against the US-backed infrastructure program. Police used tear gas and water cannons to disperse the protesters. A protester said that the agreement will undermine Nepal's law and integrity. A statement from the US embassy said the project was requested by the Nepalese government and people and was designed to reduce poverty and boost Nepal's economy in a transparent manner.
