= Guthi bill =

Controversial bill introduced and later withdrawn by the Government of Nepal

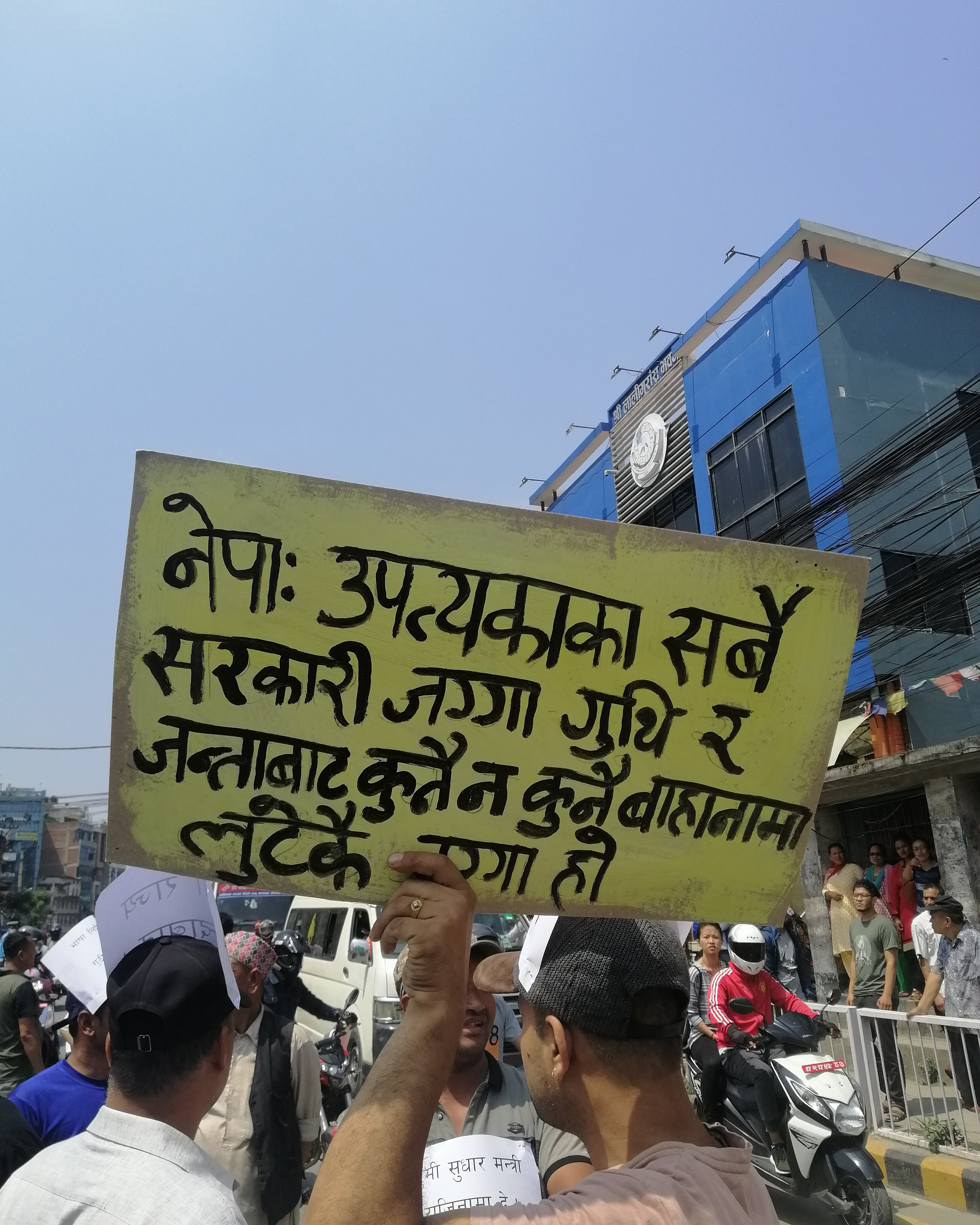
Guthi bill protest

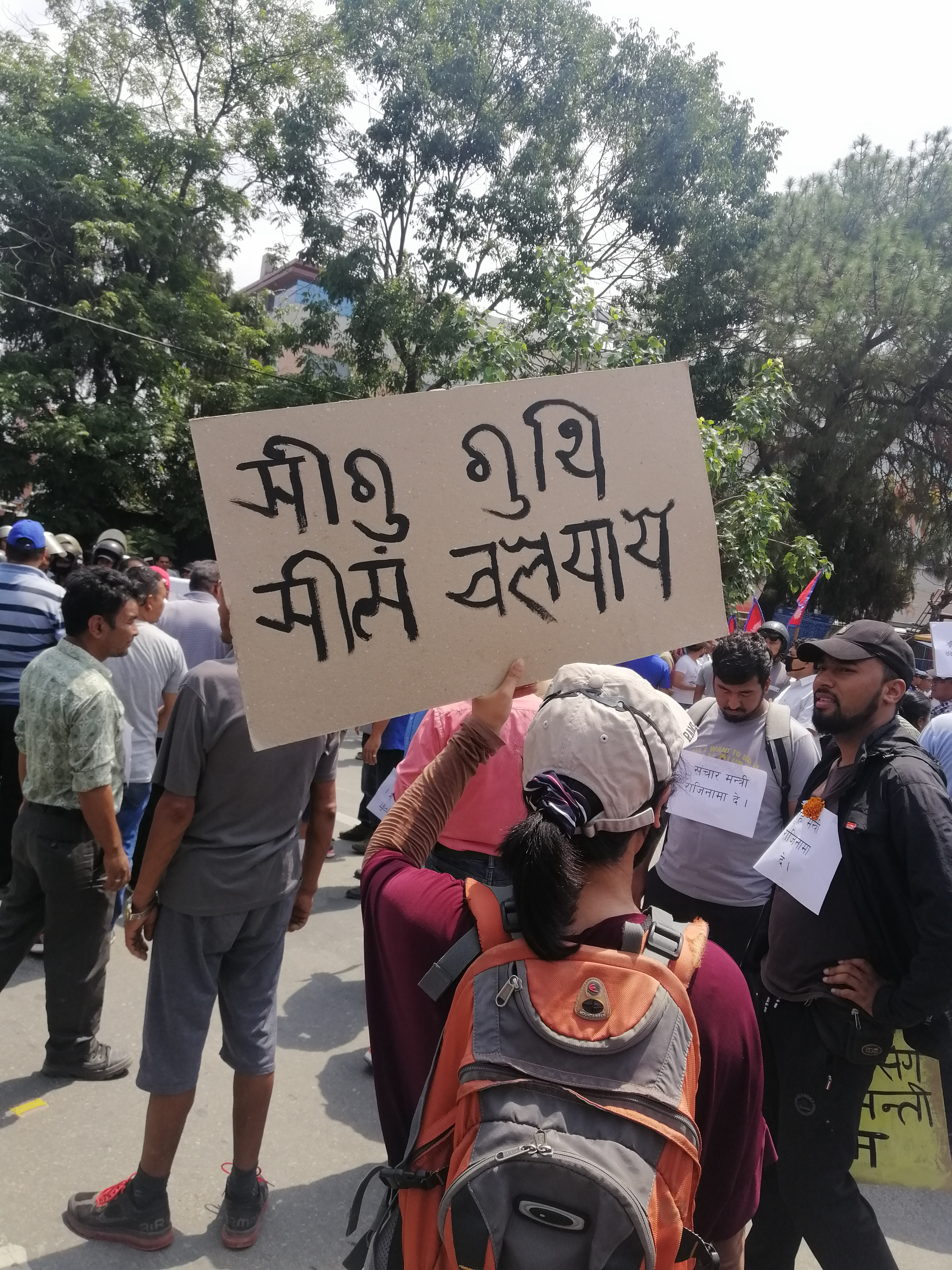

Guthi Bill was a controversial bill tabled at the National Assembly of Nepal by the Ministry of Land Management, Cooperatives and Poverty Alleviation on 29 April 2019. It proposed nationalising all guthis and replacing the Guthi Sansthan with a powerful commission that would manage and regulate all guthis as well as religious sites and ceremonies. The proposed bill, and especially clauses 23 and 24 of it, sparked widespread protests by the Newar community in the Kathmandu Valley which viewed the bill as an attack on their religious and cultural heritage. Following a period of sustained street protests, the government officially withdrew the bill on 25 June 2019, the first time an incumbent Nepali government has withdrawn a bill it introduced to parliament.
