= 2023 Nepalese pro-monarchy protests =

Protest in nepal

Nepal's Monarchy Restoration Protest
- Date: November 2023
- Location: Nepal
- Goals: Restoration of Nepal's monarchy; Return to Nepal's status as a Hindu State

Parties
(Nepal) Pro-monarchy protesters: Campaign to protect nation, nationalism, religion, culture and citizens; RPP supporters	Government of Nepal: Nepal Police; CPN (UML) supporters

Lead figures
(Nepal) Durga Prasai	(Nepal) Pushpa Kamal Dahal

Casualties
- Injuries: Several
- Arrested: 210+

On November 23, 2023, tens of thousands of protestors in Kathmandu led by Durga Prasai filled the streets, calling for the Restoration of the monarchy, which had been abolished in 2008. The protesters, many of whom were waving the national flag and chanting slogans supporting former King Gyanendra, were met with a heavy police presence. Riot police used batons, tear gas, and water cannons to disperse the crowd, and several protesters were injured.

Further protests, organized by the pro-monarchy Rastriya Prajatantra Party, were held in Kathmandu on February 21 and April 9, 2024.

== Background ==
Nepal was a monarchy for centuries until 2008, when King Gyanendra was overthrown by a pro-democracy movement. Protesters calling themselves the "Citizens' Campaign" claim that the administrations in power since the monarchy was overthrown as a condition of an agreement that put an end to a Maoist insurgency have fallen short of their promises to improve the nation.

== Protest ==
On November 23, 2023, tens of thousands of protesters, loosely organised under the Campaign to protect nation, nationalism, religion, culture and citizens (Rashtra, Rashtriyata, Dharma-Sanskriti Aur Nagarik Bachau Andolan), marched down the streets of Kathmandu demanding the restoration of the monarchy and Nepal's status as a Hindu kingdom.

The protest turned violent when protesters attempted to breach a police barricade on the outskirts of Kathmandu and march into the centre of the capital, prompting riot police to intervene and repel the crowd. Protesters also clashed with Communist Party of Nepal (Unified Marxist–Leninist) (CPN-UML) supporters.

On November 24, the government placed Durga Prasai, leader of the Campaign to protect nation, nationalism, religion, culture and citizens, under an unofficial house arrest in an attempt to deter further protest.

Later, supporters of Prasain held massive demonstrations in the Tinkune area of Kathmandu. The Tinkune area had been allocated for the CPN-UML's youth wing, while the Balku area was designated for Prasain's supporters. As Prasai's supporters lacked a permit to protest in a public place, police arrested more than 210 demonstrators. According to The Kathmandu Post, some of the people arrested were just passersby.

Protests continued in Kathmandu from November 25 to 27.

Smaller follow-up protests organized by the Rastriya Prajatantra Party were held on February 21 and April 9, 2024.

== See also ==
- 1990 People's Movement
- 2020–2021 Nepalese protests
- Nepalese Civil War
- 2006 Nepalese revolution
