= Annapurna Post =

Nepali daily newspaper

- Type: Newspaper; Online news portal
- Format: Broadsheet
- Owner(s): Annapurna Media Network (AMN)
- Publisher: Captain Rameshwar Thapa
- Editor-in-chief: Akhanda Bhandari
- News editor: Shambhu Kattel
- Founded: 2002; 23 years ago
- Language: Nepali language
- Headquarters: Corporate Tower, Tinkune, Kathmandu
- Country: Nepal
- Website: annapurnapost.com

Annapurna Post (Nepali: अन्नपुर्ण पोस्ट) is a daily broadsheet newspaper published in Nepal. It started printing in 2002 and launched its online news portal in 2013 by Annapurna Media Network, which also owns The Annapurna Express, AP1 TV and Radio Annapurna Nepal. By 4 April 2014, its online news portal was listed among 10 most visited news portal in Nepal. It also launched its own mobile news app by 2018.

In the annual newspaper classification report 2073/2074 BS by Press Council Nepal, this newspaper was categorized in the A category, the second highest possible rank below A+.

== Readership ==
Annapurna Post is among the second most-widely read Nepali language newspapers, whose shares of readership were around 4–7% of Nepalis who read a newspaper according to an audience survey in 2016, considerably behind the leader Kantipur which was read by over half of those who read newspapers.

== Critiques ==
It is reported that 7% of its posts were based on unrevealed source of information which apparently falls under misleading news media.
