= Gai Jatra Third Gender March =

LGBTQ event in Nepal

The Gai Jatra Third Gender March (Nepali: गाई जात्रा तेस्रोलिङ्गी र्‍याली, romanized: Gā'ī Jātrā Tēsrōliṅgī Ryālī) is an LGBT March on the Newar festival Gai Jatra (Saa Paaru). The Blue Diamond Society organizes the march, which celebrates different forms of Pride. Blue Diamond Society organizes, and brings LGBT people to dance on the streets during this festival. Unlike other Pride marches in Nepal, it is not seen as a political movement, but a celebration of an existing festival.

== History ==
The Gai Jatra Pride Parades began in 2010.

=== 2010 ===
On 25 August 2010 the first Pride Festival was held in Kathmandu. It featured around 2000 participants from various countries such as India, Japan, United Kingdom, Germany, Denmark and Norway. The march included Irish lawmaker Dominique Hanningan and British Ambassador to Nepal John Tucknott.

The parade was led by Sunil Pant, the first openly gay member of the Nepalese Parliament. Men and women marched wearing costumes, animal ensembles and masks. The March was in contrast to earlier marches when participants hid their faces. The march included human rights organisations and politicians.

=== 2011 ===
In August 2011, the parade took place in the town of Biratnagar in order to increase awareness in rural areas. The same year Nepal became the first country in the world to include a third gender on its federal census.

=== 2012 ===
On 3 August, the third parade took place in Lakeside, Pokhara. The festival drew supporters from local people as well as the tourists. The theme of the Gaijatra festival was "Bringing Friends and Families Together for Solidarity towards Equality, Protecting Mountain Eco-systems and Promoting ‘Visit Lumbini Year 2012’ in Nepal." The parade ended with the candle memorial in the memory of the victims of the Seti River flood.

=== 2013 ===
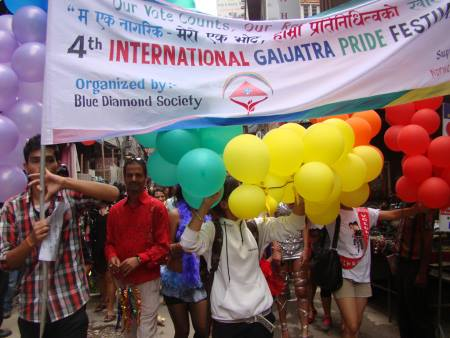
4th Gai jatra pride festival in Nepal 2013

In 2013, the pride parade took place on 22 August in Kathmandu. The parade included around 1000 people, including gays, lesbians, transgender people and their supporters.

=== 2014 ===
LGBT people and supporters joined a march in Kathmandu on 11 August to celebrate the fifth annual festival. Attention focused on legalisation of same-sex marriage.

=== 2015 ===
The sixth festival took place on August 30 in Kathmandu. Thousands of people gathered to watch as over 500 members of the LGBT community paraded, carrying rainbow banners. The theme for the parade was "The constitutions will cement the hopes cracked by the earthquake, Avoid gender-based discrimination while rebuilding the structures". The event started from Thamel gateway and ended with cable light remembering those who died the 2015 Nepal earthquake. One staff member of Blue Diamond Society and one transgender person who died were memorialized.

=== 2016 ===
Almost a thousand people took part in the seventh Pride Parade in Kathmandu on August 19. The parade demanded equality and an end to discrimination for LGBTQ people, which continued despite a constitutional ban on discrimination based on sexuality. US Ambassador Alaina B Teplitz was a supporter. The Blue Diamond Society received support from the United Nations Development Program (under the Global Fund MSA program), Royal Norwegian Embassy and Open Society Foundation.

=== 2017 ===
A month before the eighth Pride Parade took place on August 8, a transgender women and her husband were issued a marriage certificate.

The parade took place in Kathmandu, featuring vibrant costumes and rainbow balloons and flags. Around 1500 people took part and paid tribute to members of the LGTB community who had died in 2017, including American artist Gilbert Baker, who designed the rainbow flag that is the emblem of the gay community.

=== 2018 ===
This year marked the ninth parade. It took place on August 27 in Kathmandu. The theme Alliances for Solidarity, as decided by the Blue Diamond Society. The parade commenced in Thamel and concluded in Hanuman Dhoka. The country has various legislation emphasizing equality. However, Chapter 3 of Civil Code, part 1, article 67, which discusses marriage laws, does not recognize same-sex marriage.

== Criticisms ==
Locals including LGBT people from Newar community criticized Blue Diamond Society for establishing Pride Parade during a festival of humor and jokes. Newar people who traditionally celebrate the Gai Jatra (Saa Paaru) festival commented that the festival was meant to elevate jokes and humor, making LGBT issues into a joke. Voices were raised against its unilateral decision to convert a traditional festival into something else. The celebration led to cultural conflict in Kathmandu. Blue Diamond Society pay NPR 1000 per individual for participating in the Pride Parade. Blue Diamond Society was attacked for discarding the traditional essence of the festival. The traditional festival of Gai Jatra(Saa Paaru) featured people crossdressing as entertainment. They protested that the gender identity of a transgender woman was equated to a cisgender man crosdressing.

A campaign named Not a Mockery - No Pride on Gaijatra was begun on social media protesting the parade.

== Conflicts ==
Critics such as Sunil Babu Panta assert that the Third Gender March during Gai Jatra is an extension of the festival and not a pride parade per se.

== See also ==
- LGBT rights in Nepal
- Blue Diamond Society
