= Same-sex marriage in Nepal =

Same-sex marriage has been legal in Nepal since 18 June 2026, when the Supreme Court issued a binding order to the government to recognise same-sex marriages. Prior to this decision, the legal status of same-sex marriage in Nepal had been the subject of lengthy litigation. In November 2008, the Supreme Court ruled in Sunil Babu Pant v. Nepal Government that the government must ensure equal rights for same-sex couples, and recommended legal recognition of same-sex relationships, but did not itself legalize same-sex marriage. The government subsequently delayed enacting comprehensive legislation recognizing same-sex unions. Despite repeated commitments to introduce a same-sex marriage bill, the Federal Parliament enacted the National Code of Nepal in 2018 that explicitly defines marriage as the union of "a man and a woman". In addition, the Constitution of Nepal, approved in September 2015, includes "gender and sexual minorities" as a protected category, but does not specifically address same-sex marriages.

On 28 June 2023, Supreme Court Justice Til Prasad Shrestha issued an interim order directing the government to establish a "separate register" for "sexual minorities and non-traditional couples" and to "temporarily register them" pending a final verdict by the full Supreme Court bench. Despite the directive, the Kathmandu District Court denied a same-sex couple's application to marry on 13 July 2023. The couple appealed to the Patan High Court, which also rejected the application on 6 October. However, the couple was issued a "temporary" marriage license in their home Lamjung District on 29 November 2023. On 24 April 2024, the Ministry of Home Affairs issued a circular instructing local registration authorities to "temporarily" enter same-sex marriages into a separate record. However, the Ministry confirmed in May 2025 that these "temporary" certificates did not grant same-sex couples all the legal protections and benefits of marriage. Over the following years, thirty-five marriages were documented by local LGBT rights organizations, with nine confirmed by local media reports. Same-sex couples remained in legal limbo until 18 June 2026, when the Supreme Court delivered a final verdict in the case, ordering the government to recognise same-sex marriages.

== Legal history ==
=== Restrictions ===
The Marriage Registration Act, 1971 did not explicitly forbid same-sex marriage, but generally referred to married spouses as "male or female" and required that the spouses take one another as "a husband and a wife". The law was superseded by the National Code of Nepal, enacted in August 2018, which explicitly defines marriage as "when a man and a woman accept each other as husband and wife". While the National Code was under discussion in the Federal Parliament, the government requested that provisions addressing same-sex marriage be omitted from the draft code. Activists called this out as unconstitutional and contrary to Supreme Court guidelines. A spokesman said that the government intended to pass a separate law on same-sex marriage. Despite these restrictions, a lesbian couple held a traditional Hindu marriage ceremony at the Dakshinkali Temple near Kathmandu in 2011, but the marriage had no legal status in Nepal at the time. In July 2017, another couple, Monica Shahi and Ramesh Nath, successfully registered their marriage in Parshuram in the far-western Dadeldhura District. Shahi was a third gender person, with their sex recorded as "other" (अन्य, anya) on their official identity documents. LGBT activist Sunil Babu Pant congratulated the married couple, but Home Ministry spokesman Deepak Kafle said the marriage could be "invalid".

=== Constitutional wording ===
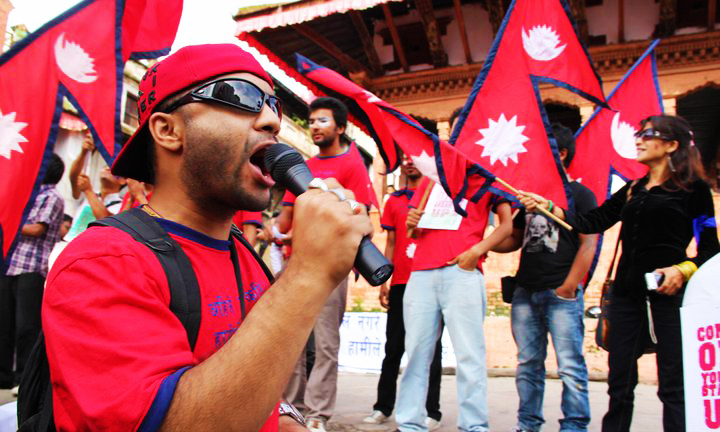
Mass rally urging the constitutional drafting process to be expedited, Kathmandu, December 2011

In 2010, several sources reported that same-sex marriage and protections for sexual minorities would be included in the new constitution being drafted. The Interim Constitution provided for a Constituent Assembly, which was charged with writing a permanent constitution. Under the terms of the Interim Constitution, the new constitution was to be promulgated by 30 November 2011, but a final six month extension was granted just before this deadline, bringing the date to 31 May 2012. Negotiations failed and Prime Minister Baburam Bhattarai dissolved the Constituent Assembly on 28 May in preparations for the 2013 elections. The elections were held on 19 November 2013. The vote was repeatedly delayed, having previously been planned for 22 November 2012 following the dissolution of the Constituent Assembly, but was put off by the Election Commission. On 10 February 2014, Sushil Koirala was elected as prime minister with a large majority, breaking the political deadlock and opening the way for the constitution to be finalised.

The Constitution of Nepal, approved in 2015, does not address same-sex marriages. However, Article 18 lists LGBT people amongst recognized and protected disadvantaged groups as "gender and sexual minorities" (Nepali: लैङ्गिक तथा यौनिक अल्पसङ्ख्यक, laiṅgik tathā yaunik alpasaṅkhyak; Maithili: लैंगिक आ यौन अल्पसंख्यक, laiṅgik ā yaun alpasaṅkhyak; Newar: जाः व यचा म्ह्वःल्याः, 𑐖𑐵𑑅 𑐰 𑐫𑐔𑐵 𑐩𑑂𑐴𑑂𑐰𑑅𑐮𑑂𑐫𑐵𑑅, jā: wa yacā mhwa:lyā:)

=== Live-in relationships ===
Live-in relationships (Nepali: सहवास सम्बन्ध, sahavās sambandha, pronounced [ˈsʌ̤ːbas ˈsʌmbʌndʱʌ̤]) are not unlawful in Nepal; however, they do not confer the same legal rights and benefits as marriage. There are no statutory protections for cohabitating same-sex couples under Nepali civil law. In 2012, the Nepali Supreme Court recognized the relationship of a lesbian couple in Rajani Shahi v. National Women's Commission. The court allowed Rajani Shahi to live with her partner Prem Kumari Nepali rather than with her husband. Shahi had filed for divorce after coming out as lesbian, but her husband later abducted her and forced her to live with him. The verdict stated:

Individuals can decide as to choosing their ways of living either separately or in partnership together with homosexuals or heterosexuals – with or without solemnizing marriage. Although in the prevailing laws and tradition "marriage" denotes legal bond between heterosexuals (male and female), the legal provisions on the homosexual relations are either inadequate or mute [sic] by now.

=== Court cases ===
Laws regarding homosexuality in Asia Same-sex sexual activity legal Marriage performed Marriage recognized Other type of partnership Unregistered cohabitation No recognition of same-sex couples Restricted or ambiguous Restriction on freedom of expression, not enforced Severe restriction of association with arrests or detention Same-sex sexual activity illegal Prison, not enforced Prison Death penalty on books, not enforced Enforced death penalty

==== 2008 Supreme Court ruling in Sunil Babu Pant ====
On November 17, 2008, the Supreme Court ruled in favor of laws guaranteeing equal rights to LGBT people and defining sexual minorities as "natural persons" under the law in Sunil Babu Pant v. Nepal Government. "This is a landmark decision for sexual minorities and we welcome it," said Sunil Babu Pant, Nepal's first publicly gay lawmaker and a leading gay rights activist in South Asia. The court asked the government to form a committee to study same-sex partnership laws in other countries and mandated that the new law not discriminate against sexual minorities, including transgender people. On March 22, 2009, Pant said in an interview with the Indo-Asian News Service that "Though the court has approved of same-sex marriage, the government is yet to enact a law," signalling that while a same-sex marriage bill had been ordered by the Supreme Court, it had yet to be drafted or voted on, much less legislated. In June 2009, Pant said the process had just started: "Nepal is going through transition and everything seems to move slowly. The seven-member committee has formed and just started working to study same-sex marriage bills in other countries. Hopefully they will draft the suggestion to make same-sex marriage law soon and give it to the government to approve."

In January 2014, Chaitanya Mishra, a member of the committee formed to study international laws on same-sex marriage, stated that work on the report had been completed, except for a summary to be drafted by the chairman of the committee. The chairman, Laxmi Raj Pathak, promised to submit the report to the government within a month, but said that the government was "not interested in the matter". Bhumika Shrestha, an activist with the Blue Diamond Society, said he was not ruling out the possibility of another lawsuit with the Supreme Court. In August 2014, the Associated Press reported that the committee had decided to recommend the legalization of same-sex marriage. That same month, the Minister of Justice, Narahari Acharya, said that his ministry would present a bill to allow same-sex marriages. The committee submitted its report to the government on 9 February 2015, and in January 2016 a government official said that its recommendations were under consultation. In February 2016, the National Human Rights Commission asked the government to introduce a bill to allow same-sex marriage. Consequently, the Ministry of Women, Children and Social Welfare created a committee for the purpose of preparing a draft bill on the issue in October 2016. In August 2018, former Prime Minister Baburam Bhattarai urged the government to legalise same-sex marriage, and on 1 July 2020 the National Human Rights Commission again called on the government to introduce a same-sex marriage bill. In 2023, Pant criticised the legislative inaction, saying, "The committee was formed, its members even went to Norway to study how same-sex married couples live. In 2015, the committee submitted their report to the government stating that Nepal should implement full marriage equality. Since then, the government and the parliament did nothing."

==== 2026 Supreme Court ruling in Pinky Gurung ====
===== Background and interim court judgement =====
In 2023, Mitini Nepal, an LGBT advocacy group, filed a lawsuit challenging the constitutionality of the definition of marriage in the Civil Code. On 7 June, Pinky Gurung, president of the Blue Diamond Society, alongside eight other applicants, filed a public interest litigation seeking the legalisation of same-sex marriage in Nepal. On 28 June 2023, Supreme Court Justice Til Prasad Shrestha issued an interim order in Pinky Gurung v. Nepal Government, directing the government to establish "a separate marriage register" for "sexual minorities and non-traditional couples" and "to temporarily register them". The judge also gave the government fifteen days to issue a written reply, a deadline the government ignored. Both President Ram Chandra Poudel and Prime Minister Pushpa Kamal Dahal refrained from making any official comment. Sunil Babu Pant celebrated the interim order, stating that "people are already rushing back to their villages and hundreds of same-sex couples will register their marriages very soon." He also claimed that the interim order would grant same-sex couples the same legal rights and benefits as married opposite-sex spouses. Some observers argued that Justice Til Prasad Shrestha had overstepped his authority, while others accused the media of pinkwashing and falsely portraying Nepal as "a beacon of LGBT rights".

On 24 April 2024, the Ministry of Home Affairs' National ID and Civil Registration Department (NIDCRD) issued a circular to local registration authorities, instructing them to enter same-sex marriages into a separate register. In September 2024, Sunil Babu Pant once again claimed that more than 150 same-sex couples were waiting to register their marriages, with many "fearing refusal by the government office" or being "scared because they have to go to their villages to register their marriage". By January 2026, nine same-sex marriages had been documented by local media reports. However, advocates repeatedly stressed the limitations of the temporary status. The Blue Diamond Society and Mitini Nepal stated several times that same-sex couples could not inherit property, receive tax subsidies, make spousal medical decisions or adopt children. Furthermore, the director of the NIDCRD, Mukesh Kumar Keshari, confirmed in May 2025 that the "temporary" marriage licenses did not grant same-sex couples the same legal rights and recognition as opposite-sex couples. The registration process was also plagued by practical difficulties. Local offices still used gendered forms on marriage certificates, forcing same-sex couples to choose "bride" (दुलही, dulahī) and "groom" (दुलहा, dulahā) roles. The process was also significantly longer and more expensive than for opposite-sex couples, who can often register their marriages in about twenty minutes without legal help.

===== Reactions and first registrations =====
On 13 July 2023, the Kathmandu District Court rejected a marriage application filed by Maya Gurung, a transgender woman, and Surendra Pandey, a cisgender man. Pant criticised the rejection as "not only a blow to the sexual minority community but also a disrespect to Til Prasad Shrestha", and vowed to appeal. The couple appealed to the Patan High Court, but it rejected the application on 6 October 2023. On 29 November, their home Lamjung District issued them a "temporary" marriage certificate. The district officials included a specific footnote stating that the marriage was "registered on a temporary basis as per the interim order of the Supreme Court". However, the certificate labelled Gurung and Pandey as "husband and wife". Pinky Gurung described the decision as "a great achievement for us, the third gender community". The Blue Diamond Society hailed the registration as an important first step, but told The Kathmandu Post that "getting a certificate alone is not enough. It is important that same-sex couples have the right to inherit property, get tax subsidies and adopt children, among others".

Another couple, Prakash Chaudhary, a transgender man, and Manila Neupane, a transgender woman, married in Kailari, Kailali District on 22 December 2023. On 31 January 2024, Mitini Nepal stated that same-sex couples still "lack[ed] the right to marry". The first marriage between two women, Suprita Gurung and Anju Devi Shrestha, occurred on 12 February 2024 in Badhaiyatal, Bardiya District. The marriage certificate used gendered roles, listing Gurung as the "groom" and Shrestha as the "bride", even though both identified as female. For security reasons, the secretary of the Badhaiyatal Rural Municipality took a fifteen-day leave after registering the marriage. Another transgender couple, China Nepali and Jyoti Sarki, married in Rampur, Palpa District on 18 August 2024, with their "temporary" marriage certificate also listing them as "groom and bride". On 24 August 2024, Prime Minister K. P. Sharma Oli stated that he "[did] not understand" same-sex marriage. His comments were cheered by the audience, and went viral across social media platforms. On 9 September 2024, the Blue Diamond Society told The Kathmandu Post that "the temporary registration falls short of offering full marriage rights, including those related to property, adoption, and tax exemptions". She added that "only around five couples have registered, and many couples are hesitant to do so", concluding that the "[LGBT] community continues to feel cheated of true equality". Another marriage occurred on 28 September 2024 in Rupa, Kaski District between Anjali Thapa Pokhara and Laxmi Silwal Raj, a third gender person whose sex was officially recorded as "other". The couple reported facing difficulties in registering their marriage.

The first marriage involving a foreign national occurred on 6 October 2024 in Dharan, Sunsari District, between Prajeet Budhathoki and Joey Foster Ellis, a U.S. citizen. Ellis highlighted the difficulties involved, telling The Himalayan Times: "We are excited to be one of the first same-sex couples to marry in Nepal. We couldn't have done this without a lawyer. So, this is a barrier for people who can't afford such a thing, which in my opinion is something that should be changed". Sacistha Shrestha, an advocate who helped the couple register, provided further context on Facebook: "This was Dharan's first same-sex marriage and Nepal's seventh same-sex marriage overall. Although provisional marriage certificates have been issued, consular services have refused to attest them, claiming that ward offices lack the jurisdiction to handle such cases. The lack of clarity continues to create challenges for those seeking full legal recognition both domestically and internationally". Sunil Babu Pant commented that the registration would "help Nepal to establish not just a gay friendly destination but also a rainbow marriage destination". On 24 February 2025, the Blue Diamond Society stated that many same-sex couples struggled to access marriage licenses due to bureaucratic resistance at local government offices. Another marriage between two women, Madhu Sunar and Rekha Bishwakarma, occurred on 30 April 2025 in Barbardiya, Bardiya District. The couple reported that they were subjected to a traditional Nepalese exorcism in an attempt to prevent their marriage.

On 8 May 2025, Sushila Ramtel and Pratima Tamang applied to register their marriage in Sunkoshi, Sindhuli District. Local officials dismissed the same-sex marriage registration directive as "fake" and "impossible" and refused to register the marriage. The couple was later forcibly separated by police in Lalitpur District, where officers reportedly verbally harassed them. Ignoring Tamang's pleas that she felt unsafe, police handed her over to her family. She was then locked in a room, cut off from communication, and her family attempted to subject her to an exorcism. The NIDCRD intervened by calling the ward office to press for the registration. However, when the couple returned on 14 May, the head of the office again refused to cooperate, stating, "even if I have to lose my job, I won't register a marriage between two women". He only reluctantly complied after a second call from the NIDCRC. Despite the registration, Ramtel and Tamang were still labeled as "groom and bride" on their marriage certificate. According to the NIDCRC, the "temporary" certificate did not grant full marriage benefits, such as property rights, adoption or tax exemptions. It noted that "until a final decision replaces the provisional one, there's not much more we can do. Many of these problems can only be resolved with a final court verdict". Mitini Nepal explained that many same-sex couples had abandoned plans to marry altogether due to persistent bureaucratic obstacles, discrimination and the financial and psychological burdens; "many people fear[ed] that provisional certificates [could] be revoked at any time, and that the low number of same-sex registration records could be used by lawmakers to argue against permanent protections".

===== Final verdict =====
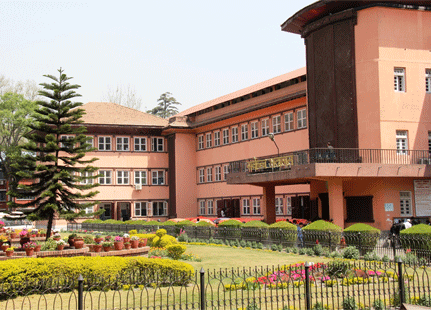
The Nepal Supreme Court in Kathmandu has issued several landmark rulings on the recognition of same-sex unions.

Following multiple postponements, a two-judge bench referred the case to the full constitutional bench of the Supreme Court on 16 June 2025. The Supreme Court subsequently heard oral arguments on 7 May 2026 and directed the government to submit all relevant studies by 5 June. It ruled in favor of same-sex marriage on 18 June, ordering the Council of Ministers, the Ministry of Law, Justice and Parliamentary Affairs, and the Ministry of Women, Children, Gender and Sexual Minorities and Social Security to release all studies and filed conducted since the court's initial ruling in Sunil Babu Pant and Others and to ensure equal marriage rights for same-sex couples. Pant described the decision as a "landmark ruling" which marked "a historic milestone for equality, dignity, and human rights in Nepal, while providing crucial legal clarity and protection for the rights of same-sex couples". The court also rejected a counter-writ against same-sex marriage rights. A lawyer for the plaintiffs welcomed the Supreme Court ruling, arguing that the "verdict has silenced those who say that marriages of gender and sexual minority couples should not be registered."

=== Recognition of marriages performed abroad ===
In December 2016, Leslie Louise Melnyk, a U.S. citizen who had married her partner Suman Pant, a Nepalese national, in California the year prior, applied for a "Non-Tourist Visa" ("NT Visa") with the Department of Immigration (DOIM) as the dependant of a Nepalese citizen. While the DOIM had initially accepted the request for the visa, it backtracked after media began reporting on the story. The DOIM denied their application on the grounds that Nepali law did not recognize same-sex marriage. The couple filed a lawsuit with the Supreme Court in March 2017 requiring the DOIM to issue a dependent visa to Melnyk. The court issued its judgement in Suman Pant v. Ministry of Home Affairs et al. on 23 October 2017, ruling that under the Immigration Rules a foreign national who submits a valid marriage license with a Nepali citizen is eligible to obtain an "NT Visa" as a dependant. The Supreme Court further held that the rules do not specify that a foreign national applying for an "NT Visa" must either be of the same or opposite gender. It also ruled that Suman Pant, as a member of a "gender and sexual minority", is entitled to the fundamental right to live a life with dignity without discrimination under the Constitution of Nepal.

On 20 March 2023, the Supreme Court issued a ruling ordering the government to recognize the marriage of Nepali national Adhip Pokharel and German national Tobias Volz and to issue a spousal visa to Volz. Judges Hari Prasad Phuyal and Tank Bahadur Moktan also directed the government to draft legislation for full marriage equality in Nepal, declaring laws banning same-sex marriage to be unconstitutional and discriminatory. After marrying in Germany in October 2018, the couple moved to Nepal, and attempted to have their marriage recognized by immigration authorities. Volz applied for a spousal visa citing the Supreme Court's ruling in Suman Pant; however, the Department of Immigration rejected his application. Consequently, the couple filed a lawsuit, Adhip Pokharel & Tobias Volz v. Ministry of Home Affairs & Department of Immigration, with the Supreme Court to have their marriage recognized. The Supreme Court held on 20 March that the equality and equal protection clause of the Nepali Constitution guarantees equal rights to "gender and sexual minorities", and criticised the Department of Immigration for not abiding by their previous judgement in Suman Pant. The court ordered the department to amend its visa forms to cover same-sex couples, and ordered the government to amend all discriminatory provisions in existing legislation, including marriage and inheritance laws.

== See also ==
- LGBT rights in Nepal
- Recognition of same-sex unions in Asia
