= LGBTQ rights in Nepal =

- Nepal
- Legal status: Legal before 1963, legal since 2007
- Gender identity: third gender recognised, however, no changes between male "M" and female "F" permitted.
- Military: LGBT people allowed to serve openly
- Discrimination protections: Limited protections

Family rights
- Recognition of relationships: Same-sex marriage since 2026
- Adoption: No

Lesbian, gay, bisexual, and transgender (LGBTQ) rights in Nepal have expanded in the 21st century, though much of Nepal's advancements on LGBT rights have come from the judiciary and not the legislature. Same-sex sexual acts have been legal in Nepal since 2007 after a ruling by the Supreme Court of Nepal.

On 28 June 2023, a single judge bench of Justice Til Prasad Shrestha issued a historic interim order directing the government to make necessary arrangements to "temporarily register" the marriages of "non-traditional couples and sexual minorities". The full bench of the Supreme Court has yet to deliver a final verdict. The first marriage of a trans woman and a cisgender man occurred in November 2023.

On 24 April 2024, the National ID and Civil Registration Department issued a circular to all local registration authorities, instructing them to enter all same-sex marriages into the separate register. The temporary registration does not grant same-sex couples the same legal rights and recognition as opposite-sex couples. Same-sex couples cannot inherit property, receive tax subsidies, make spousal medical decisions or adopt children, among others. It is not known if all local governments are complying with the instruction of the National ID and Civil Registration Department.

Prior to March 2023, and based on a ruling of the Supreme Court of Nepal in late 2007, the government was considering the legalization of same-sex marriage. According to several sources, the Constitution of 2015 was expected to include it. Although the Constitution explicitly says that "marginalized" communities are to be granted equal rights under the law, and that Nepal's LGBT people fall into this category, it does not explicitly address the right of same-sex marriage.

The Nepalese Constitution, approved by the Constituent Assembly on 16 September 2015, includes several provisions pertaining to the rights of LGBT people. These are the right to acquire a citizenship certificate in accordance with one's gender identity, a prohibition on discrimination on any ground including sex by the State and by private parties.

Despite some laws and provisions protecting third gender people, LGBT people still face societal discrimination in Nepal and there is significant pressure to conform and to marry a partner of the opposite sex. Some observers accused the media and activists of pinkwashing and spreading disinformation about same-sex marriage and LGBT rights in Nepal. As of June 2025, gender-affirming surgeries are available in Nepal.

Various forms of conversion therapy are practiced in Nepal including treatment in rehabilitation centres and traditional Nepalese exorcism by family members.

According to a 2021 study, LGBTQ individuals in Nepal face severe discrimination, social isolation, and human rights violations. LGBTQ people face social stigma both by family, employment, and healthcare settings.

In April 2026, Balen Shah assumed the office of Prime Minister, after his party won an overwhelming majority in the February 2026 elections. Many in the LGBTQ community criticized him over a rap video on YouTube in which he used derogatory and homophobic hate speech, calling for a public apology and the removal of the video. Following their demands, there has been a significant increase in derogatory comments, hate speech, and death threats directed at the LGBTQ community by supporters of the newly elected Prime Minister.

== Terminology ==
The term LGBTI is increasingly used in Nepal, rather than just LGBT, with the I denoting intersex people. The term "gender and sexual minorities" (Nepali: लैङ्गिक तथा यौनिक अल्पसङ्ख्यक) is used in the Constitution of Nepal. Among young Nepalis, the terms "queer" (Q) and "MOGAI" (Marginalized Orientations, Gender Identities, and Intersex) are also used. Certain activists have also coined an acronym PoMSOGIESC, standing for "people of marginalized sexual orientation, gender identity & sex characteristics", to encompass a larger spectrum of identities beyond the LGBT terminology.

LGBTQI+ terminology exists alongside indigenous terminologies for identifying sexual and gender minorities. This vocabulary includes terms like meti, fulumulu, and kothi, among many others. While academic sources tend to favor Western, LGBTQI+ terminologies over indigenous ones, many individuals prefer indigenous terms.

Other terms include:

- mahilaa samalingi - lesbian
- purush samalingi - gay
- duilingi - bisexual
- tesro lingi - transgender
- antaralingi - intersex

== Legality of same-sex sexual activity ==
Prior to 2007, same-sex relations between consenting adults was considered to be a crime. Article 1 of Chapter 16 of the 1963 National Code, referred to as Muluki Ain, criminalized aprākṛtik (unnatural sexual intercourse). As a result, same-sex sexual activity, which was considered "unnatural" at the time, could have a jail sentence of up to 1 year and many Nepalese LGBTQI+ people were arrested under this law.

This framework shifted in December 2007 when the Supreme Court of Nepal ruled that same-sex sexual intercourse was not to be construed as "unnatural" in Sunil Babu Pant and Others v. Nepal Government case. The ruling effectively decriminalized homosexuality in Nepal. Although Nepal's new Criminal Codes Act (2017), which replaced the Muluki Ain, continues to criminalize "unnatural sex", it should be read in light of the Court's ruling which states homosexuality is not considered to be "unnatural".

The age of consent in Nepal is 18, regardless of gender or sexual orientation.

== Recognition of same-sex relationships ==
=== Sunil Babu Pant and Others v. Nepal Government ===
One of the first cases to determine the shift in legislation regarding LGBTI rights in Nepal was the 2007 Supreme Court case Sunil Babu Pant and Others v. Nepal Government.

In April 2007, a coalition of organizations representing LGBTI Nepalis filed a writ petition under Article 107 (2) of the Interim Constitution of Nepal. The petition, filed by the Blue Diamond Society, Mitini Nepal, Cruse AIDS Nepal and Parichaya Nepal, expressed "dissenting view with the prevalent societal structures or norms as well as legal provisions adopted by the state based on the interest of majority people". The petition asked that Nepal officially recognize "transgender individuals as a third gender, prohibit any discriminatory laws on the basis of sexual orientation and gender identity, and invest due finances for reparations by the State to victims of State violence and discrimination".

On 21 December 2007, the Supreme Court ruled that the government must create laws to protect LGBTI rights and change existing laws that are tantamount to discrimination. Based on the Yogyakarta Principles and the Special Procedures of the UN Human Rights Council, the court concluded that sexual orientation is to be defined by one's self-identification and a natural process rather than a result of "mental, emotional or psychological disorder". While not explicitly legalizing same-sex marriage, the ruling instructed the government to form a committee to look into "decriminalizing and de-stigmatizing same-sex marriage".

=== Response to the ruling ===
A bill to legalize same-sex marriage was drafted and scheduled to be introduced by 2010. In the drafting of the new Nepalese Constitution, same-sex marriage and protection for sexual minorities were also expected to be established. However, negotiations on the new Constitution failed and Prime Minister Baburam Bhattarai dissolved the 1st Nepalese Constituent Assembly on 28 May 2012 in preparation for new elections. Ultimately, when the Constitution was finally adopted in 2015 by the 2nd Nepalese Constituent Assembly, it did not address same-sex marriage. Furthermore, the new Nepali Civil Code, which came into effect in 2017, did not solidify same-sex marriage. Instead it specifically defined marriage as being between partners of the opposite sex As a result, activists and legal scholars have criticized the Civil Code as being contrary to the Supreme Court guidelines.

Even with these legal setbacks, there was some progress in regards in same-sex marriage becoming legalized in Nepal. In 2017, the first transgender couple in Nepal was able to register their marriage and receive a marriage certificate from officials, even though Nepal did not have any existing laws pertaining to transgender unions. Other judicial cases also continued to expand rights, recognizing foreign same sex marriages between Nepali citizens and foreigners for immigration and residency reasons.

On 28 June 2023, a single judge bench of Justice Til Prasad Shrestha, a judge at the Nepali Supreme Court, issued a historic order directing the government to establish a separate register of marriages for non-traditional couples and sexual minorities, and to begin temporarily registering their marriages. While, the full bench of the Supreme Court has yet to deliver a final verdict, this was a landmark decision in terms of setting the stage for same-sex marriage to become legal in Nepal. While some critics believed that Justice Til Prasad Shrestha overstepped his functions and abused his authority, other communities celebrated. It is estimated that around 200 third gender activists went back to their villages to register their marriages. These marriage registrations are provisional and won't be permanent until a final decision is made by the Supreme Court.

There have been difficulties with implementing this new order in Nepal. For example, in July 2023, the Kathmandu District Court rejected a marriage registration application filed by a Nepali couple despite the ruling. In response, third gender activist Sunil Babu Panta stated, "The court's action is not only a blow to the sexual minority community, but it also dishonored the Til Prasad Shrestha's order...We will knock on the doors of the Supreme Court as soon as possible to dry our tears."

Still, on November 29, 2023 Nepal became the second Asian country (besides Taiwan) to register a same-sex marriage. Furthermore in April 2024, Nepal's National ID and Civil Registration Department notified all local marriage registration authorities instructing them to enter all same-sex marriages into the separate register and start issuing marriage registrations for LGBTQI+ people. According to Blue Diamond Society, a LGBTQI+ activist group, as of June 2025 there have been at least 17 documented queer marriages.

However due to the temporary registration status, marriage registration doesn't grant same-sex couples in Nepal the same legal rights and recognition as opposite-sex couples. Same-sex couples cannot inherit property, get tax subsidies, make spousal medical decisions or have the ability to adopt children. They are also labeled as "groom and bride" on the marriage certificate. It is also not known if all local governments are complying with the instruction of the National ID and Civil Registration Department.

== Gender recognition ==
On 31 October 2021 twenty nine LGBT and intersex rights organizations, two federations, five loose networks and others have collectively proposed an Act regarding Gender Identity, 2021. Queer Youth Group, an LGBT rights organization, has filed several writ petitions at the Supreme Court of Nepal demanding legal recognition of gender identity. On 2022 March 29, the group proposed A Directive on Gender Recognition for Intersex People, A Directive on Gender Recognition for transgender men and transgender women and A Directive on Gender Recognition for Non-Binary and Third Gender People, proposed to be promulgated by the Supreme Court.

=== Third gender recognition ===
The Supreme Court has dictated that the category "other" or anya (Nepali: अन्य), representing non-cisgender identities be added to all official documents and Nepalis identifying as such be given citizenship documents to reflect their new status. The government has started issuing citizenship with an "other" ("O") option to transgender people on a rolling basis. This allows for "third gender" identifying individuals to open bank accounts, own property and register for universities. In 2008, Bishnu Adhikari became the first Nepali citizen to officially register under the "third gender" category, with Badri Pun being the second. Other legal accomplishments include allowing citizens to register to vote as "third gender". In 2015, Monica Shahi became the first person to gain a passport with the "other" gender category, and Bhumika Shrestha became the first transgender woman to travel aboard with a passport that identified her as an "other" gender.

Nepal, similarly to India, Bangladesh and Pakistan, has an indigenous third gender community, considered by society as neither male or female. Such individuals, known as metis, are assigned male at birth but commonly act, dress and behave as female. Although metis (मेटी) have traditionally had important roles at weddings or at the birth of a child to ward off evil spirits, they now regularly face discrimination in education, health, housing, and employment. They are often referred to as transgender in English language publications. The term fulumulu (फुलुमुलु) is used in eastern Nepal. However, a publication of 2021 has challenged the existence of the term, and said it rather is pholo-molo. Among the Gurung people, there is a tradition of men dancing in female clothing, called maarunis, typically at barracks or at royal palaces, and are believed to bring good luck.

In 2007, the Supreme Court legally established a gender category called "other". The Nepali Supreme Court stated that the criteria for identifying one's gender is based on the individual's self-identification. This made Nepal one of the first South Asian countries to pass laws against discrimination based on one's sexual orientation. However, there continues to be difficulties with these laws actually being implemented.

In 2012, the Home Ministry issued a directive stating that people who identify as lesbian, gay, bisexual, transgender, and intersex would be classified as "other" in their legal documents. Some observers stated that the use of "others" to denote LGBT people by the state is demeaning and discriminatory. By using such alienating language, the Nepali government reinforces heteronormativity and implies that those who are non-heterosexual are the "other".

The Supreme Court's decision to implement a "third gender" may have stemmed from the long-held contemporary acknowledgment of gender variant peoples, known as metis as well as the religious traditions revering non-gender conforming characters.

In 2019, there were discussions in Parliament to require applicants to undergo sex changes in order to apply for an "O" sex descriptor.

=== Binary transgender recognition ===
Nepalese law only allows gender markers to be changed from "M" (male) or "F" (female) to "O". There are no provisions allowing transgender women to have an "F" marker or transgender men having an "M" marker. Certain activists and young LGBTI Nepalis have criticized what they call a "gender trinary", instead advocating for complete self-determination. In 2019, LGBT activist Rukshana Kapali took an open stand against labeling herself as "third gender", having taken legal steps to amend her gender identity to "female". As of 2021, a writ petition was filed at the Supreme Court of Nepal demanding amendment of her gender as female. Similarly, Nepali media was called out for forcefully using the term 'third gender' to describe trans men and trans women.

On 31 March 2020, the International Transgender Day of Visibility Queer Youth Group and Trans Rights Collective published National Transgender Demand Sheet demanding that trans people should be able to choose the gender of their choice when completing documents and forms.

On 2022 February 21, the Supreme Court of Nepal issued an order to Election Commission in the writ petition of Rukshana Kapali V. Election Commission et al. stating that a transgender woman's gender identity is woman, not third gender. This is the first instance of transgender people being legally recognized in the binary spectrum. Consequently, on 2022 February 27 and March 15, the Supreme Court ordered to issue COVID-19 vaccination certificate and passport to her with a female gender marker.

According to Human Rights Watch only a tiny number of Nepali transgender people have been able to change their gender on official documents after undergoing medical exams - ones that included doctors touching their genitals to prove they had surgery.

On 31 July 2024, the Supreme Court of Nepal ruled that Rukshana Kapali should be legally recognized on all official documents as a woman without her needing to submit to medical verification. The executive order only applies to Ali so far, while other transgender people would have to petition courts to be legally recognized.

=== Non-binary recognition ===
Nepali activists identify two distinct groups, i.e. third gender and non-binary, beyond the man and woman genders. This is due to the recent development of critiques on third gender, to be a discriminatory word. In 2020, the National Charter of Demands on Legal Recognition of Gender Identity laid forth the option 'non-binary' should be available distinct from 'third gender'. The proposed Gender Identity Act, 2021 also suggests for non-binary and third gender as two different options. A case filed at National Human Rights Commission on 22 November 2020 complaint number 654 also demands for a non-binary option to be added.

== Intersex rights ==
The rights situation of intersex people in Nepal is unclear. Local activists have identified human rights violations, including significant gaps in protection of rights to physical integrity and bodily autonomy, and protection from discrimination. However, intersex people are included in the 2015 Nepalese Constitution that protects "gender and sexual minorities."

As a result, local human rights organizations and intersex activists have called on the government to enact clear protections for intersex individuals, such as a ban on non-consensual, medically unnecessary procedures on intersex children, safeguards for bodily integrity and informed consent, and clear remedies for past abuses.

== Gender-affirming care ==
Hormone replacement therapy and sex reassignment surgery is not currently widely available or accessible for the transgender community in Nepal due to both expense and lack of gender affirming providers. Furthermore, Nepal does not have national guidelines on trans-competent healthcare.

Hormone replacement drugs cost 4,500 rupees for a six-month period, with the price alone making it untenable for many Nepali people. Even amongst people in the Nepali transgender community who can afford the cost of the medication, many take hormone replacement therapy without a doctor's prescription or medical supervision because of the stigma or lack of understanding they feel from hospitals and doctors. As a result, transgender Nepali people often obtain their hormone replacement drugs from friends or private pharmacies that don't require a doctor's prescription. This could lead to further health issues due to not taking the medication properly.

In recent years, there have been some new gender affirming services that have started up in Nepal, although lack of access is still common.

In June 2025, the first gender reassignment surgery in Nepal was performed at the Tribhuvan University Teaching Hospital. The procedure was part of a special surgical camp put together by the hospital's Plastic Surgery Department, with the goal of delivering healthcare services to the transgender community. In addition to gender reassignment surgeries, facial and breast surgeries were also performed at the camp on transgender individuals. According to a spokesperson for the hospital, these surgeries will now be made available regularly in Nepal, claiming "This brings great relief to the transgender community by offering essential, gender-affirming surgeries within the country." Tribhuvan University Teaching Hospital has since established Gender Affirming Clinic that provides services for gender affirming care.

However, due to the lack of both legal framework for gender reassignment procedures and gender affirming care in Nepal, some transgender people are still forced to travel to India and Thailand for expensive and unhygienic surgeries, facing physical, psychological, and legal challenges.

== Census ==
It was reported that Central Bureau of Statistics officially recognized a "third gender" option, in addition to male and female, in the census of 2011. It was recognized as the world's first national census to list a category other than male or female, it allowed for the government to gain data on the number of "third gender" identifying Nepalis. The census enumeration of third gender experienced many barriers and challenges. Some reported that census enumerators demanded a child to be stripped on their parents listing them as 'third gender'. However, no data of third gender were published by the bureau.

The 2021 census of Nepal also had a category for LGBTI people. In the 2021 census, 2,928 people identified as lesbian, gay, bisexual, transgender, intersex, or other diverse sexual or gender identities, however, LGBTQ+ right groups believe that there is actually around 2.5 million LGBTQ+ individuals in the country.

As a result, LGBTQ and Intersex community of Nepal raised concerns of the 2021 census and the enumeration of LGBTI as a third gender. Rights group argued that sexual orientation, gender identity and sex characteristics were being clumped into one. Various campaigns were conducted for LGBTI inclusion in census. Civil societies promulgated Charter of Demands on 'Other gender' provision in National Census 2078 (2021) condemning what they call 'tokenistic inclusion'. On 4 July 2021, a writ petition was filed against Central Bureau of Statistics et al. regarding 'tokenistic inclusion' in the census and demanding for a meaningful inclusion, that addresses diversity of Sexual Orientation, Gender Identity and Sex Characteristics. The Supreme Court of Nepal issued a show cause order on 9 July 2021.

== Military service ==
In 2007, two female soldiers were detained for more than a month and discharged from the Nepalese army after being accused of having an "illicit relationship". The army claimed that the women were dismissed for failing to maintain "discipline", while Nepali queer rights organization believe that it was actually on account of their sexual orientation.

The UNDP reports that gays, lesbians and bisexuals can serve openly in the Nepali Army. Alongside this, Nepal's military law does not explicitly forbid LGBT people from serving. However, there continues to be frequent issues of intimidation, detainment, and termination of services of LGBTQ+ people in the Nepalese armed service.

The army also doesn't recognize other genders beyond the binary, even though Nepal's law currently does. The recruitment criteria in the army only recognizes "male" and "female categories, and does not accept the "O" for other gender, even though this option is allowed on Nepali identity documents as a gender choice.

== Provisions of the 2015 Constitution ==
Several articles mentioning LGBTI rights in the country's new Constitution were approved by Parliament after lengthy deliberation. The Constitution went into effect on 20 September 2015. The section "Fundamental Rights and Duties" reads in part:

Nothing shall be deemed to prevent the making of special provisions by law for the protection, empowerment or advancement of the interests of socially and culturally disadvantaged women, Dalits, indigenous peoples, tribes, Madhesi, Tharu, Muslim, ethnic minorities, backward classes, minorities, marginalized, farmers, workers, youth, children, senior citizens, gender and sexual minorities, handicapped persons, pregnant persons, disabled or helpless, people of backward regions and economically disadvantaged citizens.

== Public opinion ==
Opinion polls on LGBT rights and same-sex marriage have never been conducted in Nepal. Ignorance about homosexuality is common and gay people are often confused with hijra that belong to the lowest caste of social hierarchy.

A Gallup poll in June 2024 nominated Nepal as "one of the most gay-friendly" countries in the world. 87% of surveyed Nepalese allegedly assessed that their country was a "good place to live for gay people", 10% disagreed, surpassing countries such as Bangladesh (where 73% thought so) and India (where 43% thought so).

== Living conditions ==
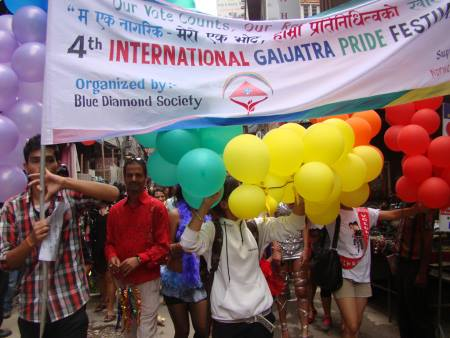
Pride festival in Nepal in 2013

=== Society ===
While the Nepalese political landscape has rapidly changed in the past decade, much of the progressive legislation has not been implemented at the community level. Traditional Nepalese gender roles stem from rigid ideals based on biological sex that tends to ostracize anyone failing to conform. These norms stigmatize LGBT Nepalis who choose to operate outside of these the gender roles, particularly affecting LGBT women as they are expected to conform to societal expectations more than men.

However, human rights organizations like the Blue Diamond Society seek to represent LGBT people in Nepal politically and also provide assistance with sexual health. A drop-in centre with free HIV testing exists in Kathmandu along with more than 50 different branches of the organization across the country. Other organizations such as Mitini Nepal, Parichaya Samaj and Sahaayam Nepal also provide resources. Popular sentiment has also become more sympathetic to LGBT rights since homophobic acts and crimes against members of the Blue Diamond Society became public, and started the Pahichan radio program, a program that discusses sexual and gender minority rights.

Nepal Pride is an annual LGBT event held in Kathmandu. It was first held in 2001 and was attended by 49 people, most of whom wore masks to avoid being recognized. In recent years, the event has attracted about 1,500 people. It purposefully coincides with the Gai Jatra festival, one of the oldest festivals celebrated in the Kathmandu Valley.

A report in The Diplomat warns that President Donald Trump's January 2025 executive order to freeze foreign aid for 90 days — had a devastating effect on Nepal's LGBTQ community. The directive threatens the more than a dozen LGBTQ groups that work in Nepal and could cost more than 1,500 community members their jobs. A former minister and influential leader of the ruling Communist Party of Nepal-United Marxist Leninist, who spoke to The Diplomat on condition of anonymity, said that "USAID had invested huge sums of money in news media and the Supreme Court, and created outsize influence in poor, corrupt, aid-hungry Nepal."

=== Violence ===
In Nepal LGBT people can face discrimination, hate speech, and violence. They also continue to be subjected to slavery and slavery-like practices. The exploitation and illegal castration of boys with feminine characteristics remains unresolved.

Despite various efforts from human rights and LGBT rights NGOs, the LGBTQI+ community in Nepal continues to face physical violence. In a survey conducted by United Nations Women in Nepal regarding the LGBTQI+ community and physical violence, 81% of survey respondents stated they had experienced at least one form of violence in their lifetime.

Gender-based violence against transgender people is a severe issue in Nepal where they often find themselves susceptible to both public and domestic violence, abuse in the workplace and at home, and elsewhere. Reasons for gender-based violence are largely attributed to social taboos and superstitions and deeply entrenched beliefs that propagate derogatory attitudes towards sexual and gender minorities. Violence also stems from law enforcement such as the police force, as many LGBT individuals report severe beatings, body searches and undue detainment.

As Nepal is one of the least developed countries in the world, many Nepali LGBT people seek opportunities for employment in countries that criminalize same-sex relationships, including Malaysia, Brunei, Kuwait and Qatar. Sunil Babu Pant says that the government should at least inform sexual and gender minority workers about the legal risks in these countries. "People have been jailed in countries like Malaysia and Qatar just for being homosexual. Many such incidents exist, no one cares. Send them to gay friendly countries like Israel or South Korea instead" Pant suggested.

=== Education ===
The United Nations Development Programme has recommended that Nepal incorporate these ideals into the education system to ensure inclusive and equitable quality education:

- Require all schools and other education providers to adopt anti-bullying policies to protect LGBTI students, and ensure teachers receive training on how to respond to homophobic and transphobic bullying.
- Integrate education on sexual orientation, gender identity, gender expression, and intersex status into school curricula in age-appropriate ways.
- Provide non-discriminatory sex education to address taboos surrounding adolescent sexuality, sexual orientation, gender identity, and gender expression and provide adolescents with access to accurate information about the diversity of sexualities, gender identities, and sex variations.
- Recognize the right of students to freedom of gender expression in the school environment. Students should be allowed to wear uniforms and express an appearance that corresponds to the gender with which they identify.
- Provide all students, including transgender and intersex students, with access to safe toilets and bathroom facilities.
- Develop policies and practices to support transgender students who transition while at school, including by ensuring their rights to privacy, dignity, and respect, and enabling their name and sex or gender details to be amended on school records.
- Provide educational resources for parents of LGBTI children

Nepal's Education Board has implemented information about sexual and gender diversity in the curriculum of grades 7-9 (age 13–15), making Nepal the second Asian country, after Mongolia, to implement this. Universities also possess courses about LGBT issues. However, many LGBT children still face discrimination and are unable to complete their education due to "threats, bullying, and neglect from fellow students and teachers alike." Furthermore, transgender Nepalis face severe gender-based violence and are unable to receive a proper education, especially in rural areas.

=== Politics ===
"Nepal is the first country in the world to ensure rights of the gender and sexual minorities. We are a role model not only for Asia but also for the entire globe."

— Arzu Rana Deuba, Minister of Foreign Affairs of Nepal, December 2024

There has been an increased level of participation in the political arena by openly LGBTI politicians such as Sunil Babu Pant, the first openly gay parliamentarian in Asia. Pant served in the Federal Parliament from 2008 to 2012.

The Communist Party of Nepal-Maoist made several homophobic statements during the Nepalese Civil War. Until 2007, party members had described homosexuality as "a production of capitalism" that "doesn't exist under socialism", and LGBT people as "social pollutants." However, since 2008, with the end of the insurgency and the beginning of a multi-party democracy, the Maoist Party has supported LGBT rights.

On 30 October 2024, Aamul Paribartan Nagarik Party held a protest rally at the Maitighar Mandala opposing homosexuality and LGBTQ rights. Sarita KC, executive director of Mitini Nepal, stated that "in Nepal and South Asia, anti-LGBTQ sentiments are gaining momentum".

=== Health ===
The HIV/AIDS epidemic affects LGBTI Nepalis across the board. 2009 estimates showed that about 3.8% of men who have sex with men (MSM) in Nepal were HIV-positive; an increase from 3.3% in 2007. In 2007, MSM in Nepal were 9.2 times more likely to acquire HIV infection than heterosexuals, notably lower than neighboring China (45 times more likely) or India (17.6 times more likely).

Lesbian couples are also denied access to vitro fertilization (IVF). Across the country, there is a severe lack of access to comprehensive health care as well as a lack of research on the mental, physical, and reproductive needs of LGBT Nepalis.

COVID-19 is thought to have had an impact on the mental health of LGBT; "27.1 per cent said they suffered excessive stress, while 21.6 per cent said they became short-tempered and 13.4 said they suffered from depression".

=== Tourism ===
"Nepal is a beacon of LGBT rights. Now, it needs to tap its potential business opportunities - pink money. They [LGBT people] don't have children to spend on. They love to travel and spend a lot of money."

— Sunil Babu Pant, "the first gay in Asia", December 2023

The Nepal Tourism Board has plans to promote Nepal as an LGBT-friendly tourist destination.

In April 2023, the Nepal Tourism Board and the Nepal Mountaineering Academy partnered to create the first trekking training program for LGBTQ people in Nepal. The Tourism Board hopes that this will allow tourists to hire LGBTQ guides when trekking.

Alongside this, Nepal is one of the first South Asian countries to embrace Pink Tourism. In 2024, Nepal hosted the first international LGBTIQ tourism conference.

== Popular culture and media representation ==
The representation of LGBT community in Nepali mainstream media is minimal. Historically, the portrayal of people of sexual and gender minorities had been in negative connotation or as a comic relief in films and television show. The queer representation have always been caricatures of transgender people, gay people, and lesbians and stereotypical. However, there have been some positive and realistic depictions in recent times. Highway, a 2012 film by Deepak Rauniyar, featured a gay character and a transgender character who is a victim of sexual violence.

Soongava: Dance of the Orchids, a 2012 movie was about a lesbian relationship. Actresses Diya Maskey and Nisha Adhikari played the lead roles. The film was also selected as the Nepalese entry for the Best Foreign Language Film at the 86th Academy Awards, but it was not nominated. However, the film has been criticized for its story and cishet male gaze.

Singha Durbar, a 2016 fictional television series by Tsering Rhitar Sherpa about first female prime minister featured a gay character, Bishwa Bishwokarma, press secretary to the PM played by Praween Khatiwada. The television show was broadcast on Nepal Television, the state broadcaster of Nepal. The series was supported by USAID.

Between Queens and the Cities, the first queer memoir from Nepal by Niranjan Kunwar was published on 5 December 2020. The book chronicles the life of the author as a gay man in different cities such as New York and Kathmandu. The book also shows the struggles of a gay man in Nepali society.

In June 2021, an art exhibition with LGBTIQ theme, Queer — A celebration of art and activism was organized in Kaalo.101, an art space based in Patan. The exhibition featured arts primarily from Nepal alongside other countries such as Pakistan, Malaysia, Indonesia and Bangladesh.

In 2023, Mitini Nepal published a book highlighting the experiences and stories of LGBTQI+ senior citizens in Nepal. The book had 10 different stories about both the struggle and triumphs that LGBTQI+ elders faced as they advocated for their rights.

== Notable LGBT organizations, figures and events in Nepal ==
=== Organizations ===
- Federation for Sexual and Gender Minorities Nepal (FSGMN), is Nepal's umbrella network of all LGBT rights organizations. The purpose of the organization is to have a uniform collective to advocate for human rights of LGBTQI+ people in Nepal.
- Blue Diamond Society, one of the first organizations in Nepal aimed to support and advocate for the LGBTQI+ population. The organization was founded by Sunil Babu Pant in 2001. The organization works to promote LGBTQI+ rights in Nepal by doing sexual and mental health outreaches, providing legal counsel, and organizing different events that bring visibility to the community. Blue Diamond Society created the Gaijatra Pride Festival in 2004 and also were one of the forefront leaders that brought the landmark 2007 Supreme Court Case that created legal reform for equal rights for Nepal's LGBTQI+ community.
- Peoples Independent Supreme Community is Non government organization advocating and making platform for gender equality and gender issues
- Mitini Nepal, founded in 2002 by Laxmi Ghalan and Meera Bajracharya, advocates for the rights of women who have identified as lesbian, bisexual, or transgender (LBT). The organization has done different forms of advocacy including creating a hotline service for LBT people in Nepal, hosting Pride events, and lobbying for the rights of gender and sexual minorities. The work Mitini Nepal has done led to major changes for the LGBTQI+ community in Nepal: the 2007 decriminalizing of identifying as homosexual and 2012 legalization people in a LGBTQI+ relationship living together.
- Queer Youth Group, is a youth-focused Queer rights group. The organization helped advocate for the citizenship bill of Nepal's legal gender recognition of trans and non-binary people and also works with governmental organizations on transgender and non-binary rights.

=== Figures ===
- Prabal Gurung, a Nepali American fashion designer. Gurung has designed clothes for popular media icons and personalities such as Michelle Obama, Catherine, Duchess of Cambridge, and Oprah Winfrey.
- Rukshana Kapali, a Newar activist in Nepal that advocates for intersex and LGBT rights. Kapali founded the Queer Youth Group in Nepal.
- Anjali Lama, a transgender model. Lama has modeled for Vogue India and also was the first transgender model to walk Lakmé Fashion Week.
- Ramraja Shrestha, Whistle Bowler and Activist of LGBT issues
- Suman Pant, whose Supreme Court case established a precedent for same-sex spousal visas
- Sunil Babu Pant, the first openly gay legislator in Nepal. Pant is also the founder of Blue Diamond Society.
- Bhakti Shah, a Nepali LGBTI activist. Shah was a former soldier in the Nepali army that was discharged for his sexual orientation, and punished with 60 days of solitary confinement. In 2017, Shah was the first transgender individual to be elected as a district committee member of the Federation of Nepalese Journalist - Lalitpur Chapter.
- Bhumika Shrestha, a "third gender" advocate. They won the 2022 International Women of Courage (IWOC) Award.

=== Events ===
- Nepal Pride Parade, an annual event held in June celebrating sexual and gender minorities.
- Queer Womxn Pride, an annual event organized on March 8 on International Women's Day to celebrate queer, transgender, and intersex women in Nepal.
- Mr. Gay Nepal
- Drag Show for Visibility, a drag pageant and performance night organized by the Blue Diamond Society.
- Miss Pink, a beauty pageant for transgender women.

Several LGBT-related events are held in Nepal. These include the main Nepal POMSOGIESC (People of Marginalized Sexual Orientation, Gender Identity and Sex Characteristics) Pride Parade, known as Nepal Pride Parade in short, is held on the second Saturday of June since 2019. Similarly, Queer Womxn Pride is held every year along with mainstream women's rights rally on International Women's Day since 2019, an Queer Indigenous Pride held every year along mainstream indigenous rights rally on International Day of the World's Indigenous Peoples since 2019. Since 2020, a Trans Pride Parade is also observed on the Saturday after 17 December. International events such as International Transgender Day of Visibility, National Coming Out Day, Transgender Day of Remembrance, and International Day Against Homophobia, Transphobia and Biphobia are also observed.

Several smaller events include Asexual Awareness Week (Last week of October), Celebrate Bisexuality Day (23 September), an awareness day for hijras (17 April) and Intersex Awareness Day (26 October).

== Summary table ==
| Same-sex sexual activity legal | Yes (Since 2007) |
| Equal age of consent (18) | Yes (Since 2007) |
| Anti-discrimination laws in employment | No |
| Anti-discrimination laws in the provision of goods and services | No |
| Anti-discrimination laws in education | No |
| Anti-discrimination laws in all other areas | Yes (Indirect constitutional protections since 2015) |
| Hate crime laws include sexual orientation and gender identity | No |
| Hate speech based on sexual orientation and gender identity prohibited | No |
| Same-sex civil unions | No |
| Same-sex marriages | Yes (Since 2026) |
| Recognition of same-sex marriages performed elsewhere | No |
| Stepchild adoption by same-sex couples | No |
| Joint adoption by same-sex couples | No |
| Adoption by single people regardless of sexual orientation | No |
| Foster care by same-sex couples | No |
| LGBT people allowed to serve openly in the military | Yes |
| Right to change legal gender | Yes / No (Only to a third gender marker "O"; no changes between male "M" and female "F" permitted) |
| Right to change legal gender without having to end marriage | No |
| Gender-neutral names on birth certificates | No |
| Transfer of trans women prisoners to women's prisons | No |
| Third gender option | Yes (Since 2011) |
| Intersex minors protected from invasive surgical procedures | No |
| Conversion therapy banned | No |
| Access to IVF for lesbian couples | No |
| Automatic parenthood for both spouses after birth | No |
| Altruistic surrogacy for same-sex couples | No |
| MSMs allowed to donate blood | Yes (not explicitly banned) |

== See also ==
- Intersex rights in Nepal
- LGBT rights in Asia
- Recognition of same-sex unions in Nepal
- Human rights in Nepal
- Witch-hunts in Nepal
