= Daudaha system =

Inspection Tour System of Nepal

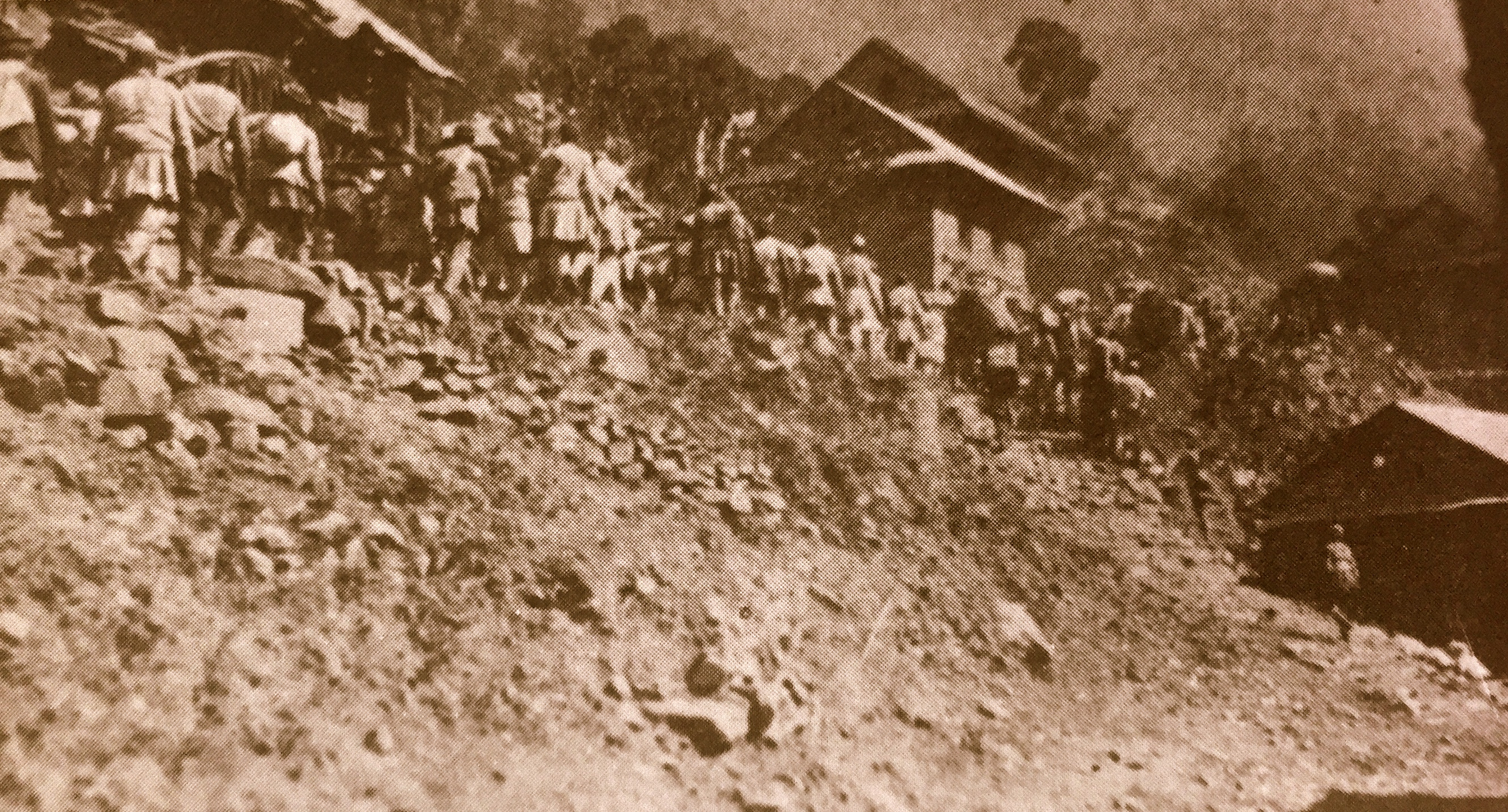
Daudaha by Rana officials in Eastern Nepal

The Inspection Tour System of Nepal known as Daudaha (Devnagri: दौडाहा) was a supervision system in Nepal mainly implemented during the Rana dynasty between 1846 and 1950. The Daudaha tour was conducted by a team of soldiers, clerks and a hakim and inspected local governments, infrastructure, and living conditions. They were used to maintain order in more remote parts of Nepal and if Muluki Ain (code of conduct) was properly conducted. Daudaha trips were on average 3 to 4 months long.

== History ==
The Daudaha system was used in Nepal during the Licchavi, Malla and Early Shah periods in certain situations. The Rana dyansty used tours extensively to govern Nepal.

== Structure ==
Each daudaha team had soldiers, official clerks and one leader (hakim) appointed by Prime Minister Maharaja himself. The structure of a team depended upon the stature of the leader. The leaders were generally from Non Rolwall Rana family and commoners but some times from High Rollwala Rana family members.

=== Non Rollwala Rana or commoner as leader ===
- Nine members: five official Kathmandu court clerks, three other clerks and one leader. The leader (Hakim) was appointed by Prime Minister Maharaja himself, thus accountable to the PM only.
- 23 soldiers for security and assistance. Each member of the team was allotted five months' salary in advance.
- Five volumes of Muluki Ain (code of conduct) handed to the court official of the team
- Mode of transportation elephants, horses; depending upon the terrain of the route
- Transportation allowances for rail-fare to travel through India (road network in Nepal was not developed).

=== Rollwala Rana as a leader ===
In every 2 to 3 years a high level Rollwala Rana was appointed as leader for certain daudaha team. Lavish preparations were made for the daudaha as these daudaha were also a hunting trip.

- Team were made up of around 400–500 members (100 officials, servants, hunters, elephant drivers and 300–400 soldiers)
- Arrangements were made with local tradesman for buying provisions for 4–5 hundred people along the route of the daudaha.
- Establishment of temporary army outpost and chaukis
- Arrangements to buy water buffalo as a bait for tiger hunting.
- Building and expansion of roads for vehicular traffic for high level Rana.

== Types Of Daudaha ==
The Daudaha tours were generally organized into four types.

- Intra-district: Conducted by the local Bada Hakim within a district under their jurisdiction.
- Standard: Organized by the Center (Capital) and sent to districts to inspect local officials and hear complaints from residents.
- Specialized: Conducted by the Center for special tasks that were unable to be handled locally.
- Fact-finding: Conducted by the Center for reporting on the state of infrastructure and the condition of the area.

== Legacy ==
King Mahendra revived the Daudaha system in late 60s by traveling himself with officials to remote parts of Nepal.

== See also ==
- Pajani System
- Rolls of Succession in Rana (Nepal)
- Rana Administrative System (Nepal)
