= White Sun (film) =

- Film poster
- सेतो सुर्य
- Directed by: Deepak Rauniyar
- Written by: Deepak Rauniyar; David Barker
- Produced by: Deepak Rauniyar; Joslyn Barnes; Tsering Rhitar Sherpa; Michel Merkt
- Starring: Dayahang Rai; Rabindra Singh Baniya
- Cinematography: Mark Ó'Fearghail
- Edited by: David Barker
- Music by: Vivek Maddala
- Release date: 6 September 2016 (Venice Film Festival)
- Running time: 89 minutes
- Countries: Nepal; Netherlands; Qatar; United States
- Language: Nepali

White Sun or Seto Surya is a 2016 biographical war drama film directed by Deepak Rauniyar and co-written by Rauniyar, David Barker. It stars Dayahang Rai and Rabindra Singh Baniya in the lead roles alongside Asha Magrati, Sumi Malla, Amrit Pariyar, Deepak Chetri and Deshbhakta Khanal. The film is based on Nepalese Civil War's conflict between royalists and Maoists.

It world premiered in the Horizons section at the 73rd edition of the Venice Film Festival. It was later screened at the 2016 Toronto International Film Festival. It was selected as the Nepali entry for the Best Foreign Language Film at the 90th Academy Awards, but it was not nominated.

== Plot ==
After nearly a decade away, anti-regime partisan Chandra must travel to his remote mountain village following his father's death. Little Pooja is eagerly awaiting the man she believes to be her father, but is confused when Chandra arrives with Badri, a young street orphan rumoured to be his son. Chandra must also confront his brother Suraj, who fought on the opposing side during the Nepali Civil War. The two brothers cannot set aside their political differences while carrying their father's body down the steep mountain path to the river for cremation. Suraj storms off in a rage, leaving Chandra with no other men strong enough to help. Under pressure from the village elders, Chandra is forced to seek help from outside the village in order to adhere to the rigid caste and discriminatory gender traditions that he fought to eliminate during the war. He searches for a solution in neighbouring villages, among the police, guests at a local wedding and rebel guerrillas.

== Cast ==
- Ganesh Neupane (Munal) as Kaaji
- Dayahang Rai as Agni / Chandra
- Asha Magrati as Durga
- Rabindra Singh Baniya as Suraj
- Sumi Malla as Pooja
- Amrit Pariyar as Badri
- Pramod Agrahari as Police officer
- Deepak Chhetri as Priest
- Deshbhakta Khanal as Uncle

== Awards ==
Awards	Category	Recipient(s)	Outcome
Fribourg International Film Festival	Audience award	Deepak Rauniyar (director)	Won
Fribourg International Film Festival	Don Quixote Award	Deepak Rauniyar (director)	Won
Fribourg International Film Festival	Ecumenical Jury Award	Deepak Rauniyar (director)	Won
Fribourg International Film Festival	Special Mention	Deepak Rauniyar (director)	Won
Fribourg International Film Festival	Grand Prix	Deepak Rauniyar (director)	Nominated
Golden Horse Film Festival and Awards	Best Asian Film	Deepak Rauniyar (director)	Nominated
Palm Springs International Film Festival	New Voices/New Visions Grand Jury Prize	Deepak Rauniyar (director)	Won
International Film Festival Rotterdam	KNF Award	Deepak Rauniyar (director)	Nominated
Singapore International Film Festival	Best Film	Deepak Rauniyar (director)	Won
Venice Film Festival	Interfilm Award	Deepak Rauniyar (director); Aadi Productions (production company); Louverture Films (production company); Waterland Film (co-production); Match Factory, The (distributor)	Won
Venice Film Festival	Best Film	Deepak Rauniyar (director)	Nominated

== See also ==
- List of submissions to the 90th Academy Awards for Best Foreign Language Film
- List of Nepalese submissions for the Academy Award for Best Foreign Language Film
