= Embassy of Kosovo, London =

Embassy of Kosovo in London
- Address: 9 Orme Court, London W2 4RL
- Coordinates: 51°31′19.06″N 0°6′53.89″W
- Ambassador: Ilir Kapiti

The Embassy of Kosovo in London is the diplomatic mission of Kosovo in the United Kingdom. The embassy is also accredited to the Republic of Ireland.

The embassy has been located at 9 Orme Court, London W2 4RL since June 2026. Previously it was located at 8 John Street, London, WC1N 2EB.

== Gallery ==
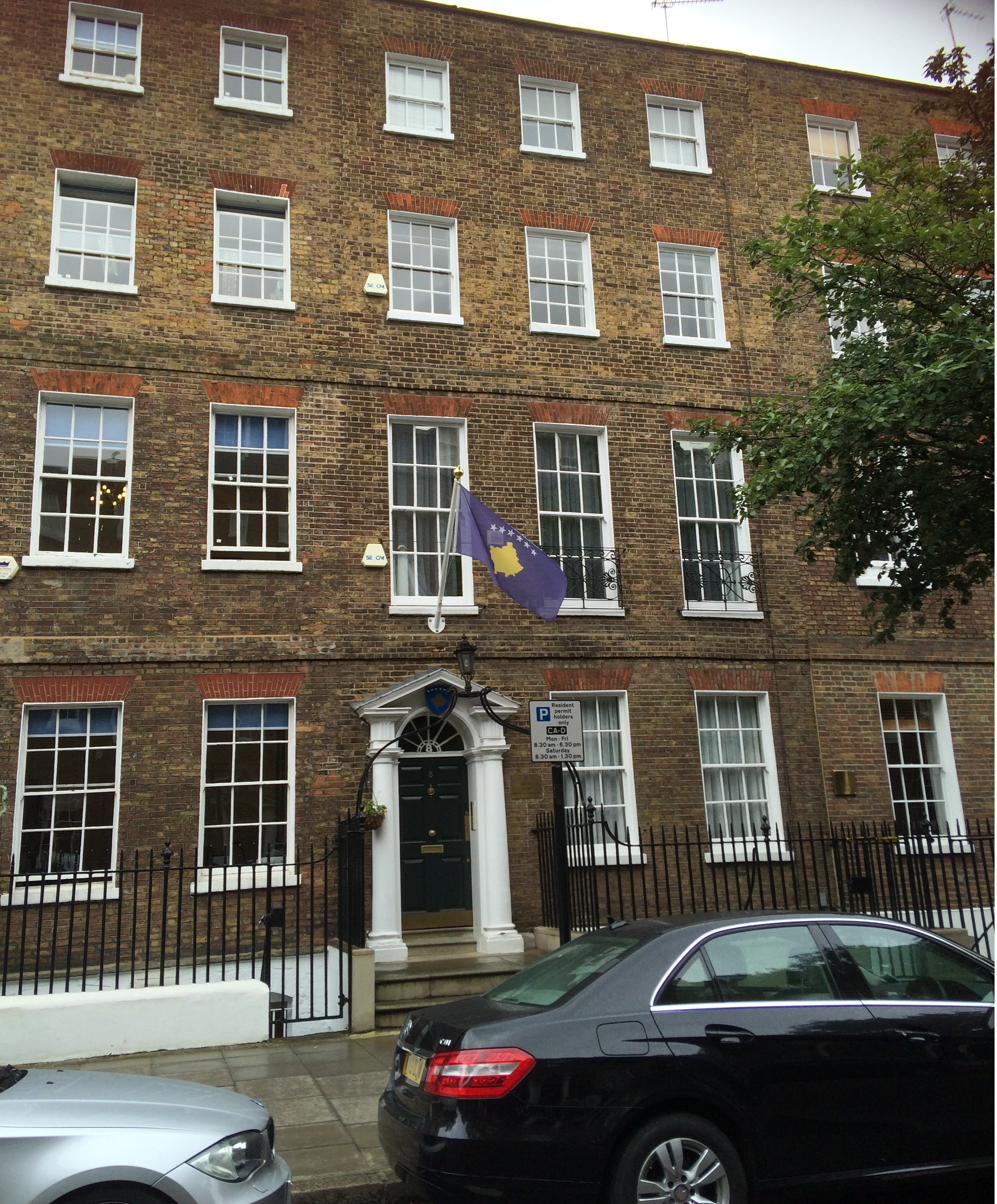
Former chancery at 8 John Street, London

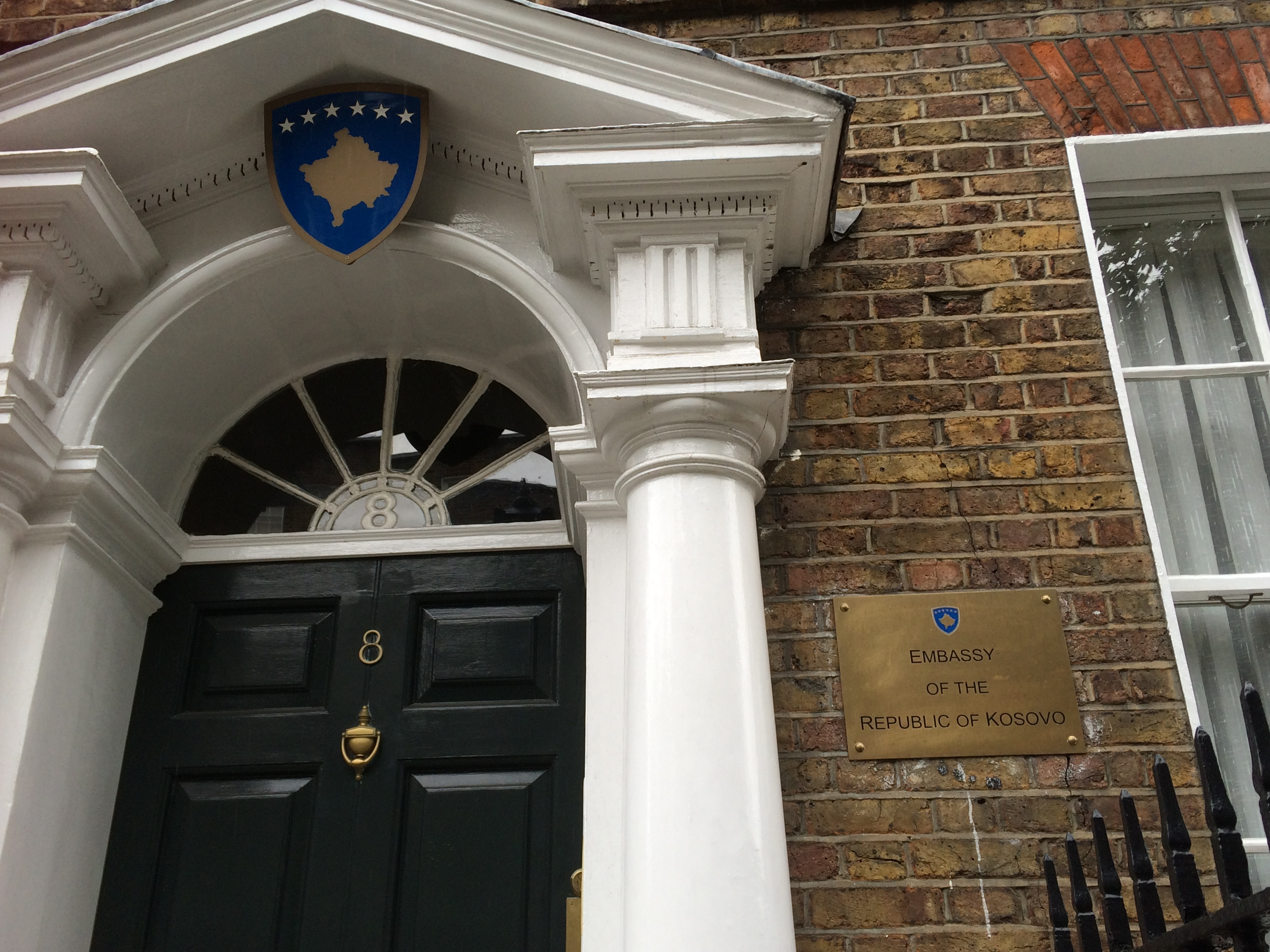
Plaques outside the former chancery depicting the Coat of arms of Kosovo

== See also ==
- Embassy of the United Kingdom, Pristina
- Kosovo–United Kingdom relations
- List of diplomatic missions of Kosovo
- List of diplomatic missions in the United Kingdom
