= Anjali Lama =

Nepalese transgender model (born c. 1985)

- अञ्जली लामा
- Born: c. 1985 (age 40–41); Nuwakot District, Kingdom of Nepal
- Known for: Nepal's first transgender model
- Modeling information
- Hair color: Black

Anjali Lama (Nepali: अञ्जली लामा; born c. 1985) is Nepal's first transgender model and a transgender rights activist.

== Early life ==
Lama was born c. 1985 into a farming family in Nuwakot District and was the fifth of seven siblings. She was gender variant as a youth, and her perceived effeminacy was mocked by family members, teachers, and schoolmates. She left Nuwakot at age 18 and moved to Kathmandu, where she says she experienced "mental torture" due to incongruence with her gender identity. She was dismissed from her job in a hotel as the staff did not accept Lama presenting as feminine.

== Coming out and modelling career ==
When Lama moved to Kathmandu, she watched Sangharsha, a television show about transgender people, and identified with the people on the show. At the suggestion of other trans women she had met, Lama became involved with the Blue Diamond Society, an LGBT group in Nepal. Despite initially being outed and rejected by her family once a member of her village told them she was trans, she told her family she was a trans woman in 2005.

She later joined a modelling agency in the city. Her early years modelling were difficult, as she experienced career discrimination due to being a trans woman. In 2007, Lama competed in a beauty pageant in Nepal for the transgender community, placing in the top 10 and winning the title of Miss Charming. Later that same year went to Bangkok to participate in the Miss International Queen. In 2009 she modeled for a national magazine called Voice of Women, and in 2010, she made her catwalk debut.

A 50-minute-long documentary film was made about Lama titled Living Inside Someone Else's Skin.

In 2017, she became well-known as the first transgender model to feature at the Lakmé Fashion Week show in India. That year, she appeared on the cover of Elle India and worked with Calvin Klein in 2019, becoming the first trans model from the Indian subcontinent to be featured in an international brand campaign, and was announced to appear in the all-women Hollywood film Women's Stories in 2021.

== See also ==
- LGBT rights in Nepal
- Blue Diamond Society
