= Bhumika Shrestha =

Nepalese politician and activist

Honourable Bhumika Shrestha
- भूमिका श्रेष्ठ
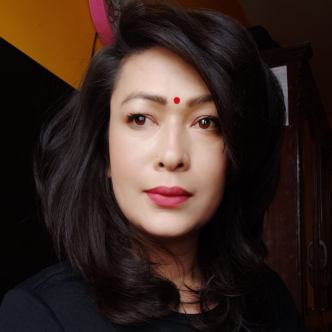
- Shrestha in 2022

Member of House of Representatives
- Incumbent
- Assumed office 27 March 2026
- Constituency: PR

Personal details
- Born: Kailash Shrestha; 11 January 1988 (age 38) Naikap, Nepal
- Party: Rastriya Swatantra
- Parent: Numaya Shrestha (mother)
- Occupation: Politician; activist
- Known for: LGBTQ+ rights activism in Nepal
- Awards: IWOC (2022)

Bhumika Shrestha (Note: Nepali: भूमिका श्रेष्ठ, romanized: Bhūmikā Śreṣṭha) (born 11 January 1988) is a Nepalese politician, LGBTQ+ rights activist, former actress and author who served as a activist before entering national politics. On 27 March 2026, she entered the House of Representatives via proportional representation (PR) list of the Rastriya Swatantra Party, becoming Nepal's first trans woman Member of Parliament (MP).

== Personal life ==
Bhumika Shrestha was born as Kailash Shrestha on 11 January 1988, in Naikap, Kathmandu, Nepal, where she grew up as the youngest of three siblings. She eventually adopted the name Bhumika Shrestha and identifies herself as a trans woman.

Despite strong initial family and community opposition during her transition, she maintained a close bond with her mother, Numaya Shrestha. Her mother later spoke publicly at the launch of Bhumika's biography.

== Political career ==
Following the Rastriya Swatantra Party's landslide victory in the 2026 Nepalese general election, Bhumika Shrestha was elected to the House of Representatives on 27 March 2026 through the Janajati proportional representation (PR) list, becoming Nepal's first trans woman member of parliament (MP).

== Filmography ==
=== Starring ===
- Highway (2012)
- Kanchhi (2018)

=== Self ===
- Other Nature as Self (2010) (Documentary film)
- Beauty and Brains (2010) (Documentary film)
- Le monde en face (2014) (TV Series – Episode Global Gay)
- Out & Around (2015) (Documentary film)

== Awards ==
In 2022, Bhumika Shrestha was awarded the International Women of Courage Award (IWOC) from the United States Department of State.

== See also ==
- LGBT rights in Nepal
- Blue Diamond Society

== Bibliography ==
- Bhumika, ISBN 9789937925921 (2019)
