= Pooja, Sir =

2024 film by Deepak Rauniyar

- Theatrical release poster
- Directed by: Deepak Rauniyar
- Written by: Deepak Rauniyar; David Barker; Asha Magrati
- Produced by: Deepak Rauniyar; Asha Magrati; Ram Babu Gurung; Alan R. Milligan
- Starring: Asha Magrati; Nikita Chandak; Dayahang Rai; Reecha Sharma; Bijay Baral
- Cinematography: Sheldon Chau
- Edited by: J. Him Lee
- Music by: Vivek Maddala
- Production companies: Aadi Films; Baasuri Films; Tannhauser Gate
- Release date: 29 August 2024 (Venice)
- Running time: 118 minutes
- Countries: Nepal; United States; Norway
- Languages: Nepali; Maithili; Hindi

Pooja, Sir is a 2024 crime drama film directed by Deepak Rauniyar. It premiered at the 81st Venice International Film Festival on 29 August 2024.

== Premise ==
Amid the political landscape of the Madhesh movement, two young boys go missing in the village of Rajagunj in southern Nepal, and Inspector Pooja Thapa is brought in from Kathmandu to solve the case.

== Cast ==
- Asha Magrati as Inspector Pooja Thapa
- Nikita Chandak as Mamata, a Madheshi police officer
- Dayahang Rai as Madan, the police captain
- Aarti Mandal as Saraswati
- Reecha Sharma as Sabita Koirala, a headmistress and Pravin Yadav's wife
- Bijay Baral as Amar
- Gaumaya Gurung as Rama, Pooja's partner
- Pashupati Rai as Menuka
- Ghanashyam Mishra as Ram
- Niraj Shrestha as Sabita Koirala's brother
- Prameshwar Kumar Jha as Pravin Yadav, a politician and Sabita Koirala's husband
- Chandra Dhoj Limbu as Pooja's father

== Production ==
Principal photography took place in Madhesh Province, Nepal, and was completed by October 2023.

== Release ==
A teaser trailer was released on 27 August 2024. The film premiered at the 81st Venice International Film Festival on 29 August 2024 as part of the Orizzonti competition. Several actors did not attend the premiere because they could not acquire visas. The film was also selected for the MAMI Mumbai Film Festival 2024, where it competed in the South Asia Competition.

The film was released in Nepal in March 2025. The release date had previously been delayed because of modifications required by the Nepal's Film Censor Board.

== Reception ==
Claire Fulton of Loud and Clear Reviews gave the film three out of five stars, writing, "Deepak Rauniyar's Pooja, Sir is really effective as a thrilling police procedural, but falters a little with its intimate character moments."

== Accolades ==
| Award | Year | Category | Result | Ref. |
|---|---|---|---|---|
| Venice Film Festival | 2024 | Orizzonti Award for Best Film | Nominated | |
| MAMI Mumbai Film Festival | 2024 | South Asia Competition | Nominated | |
