= Rukshana Kapali =

Newar activist in Nepal (born 1999)

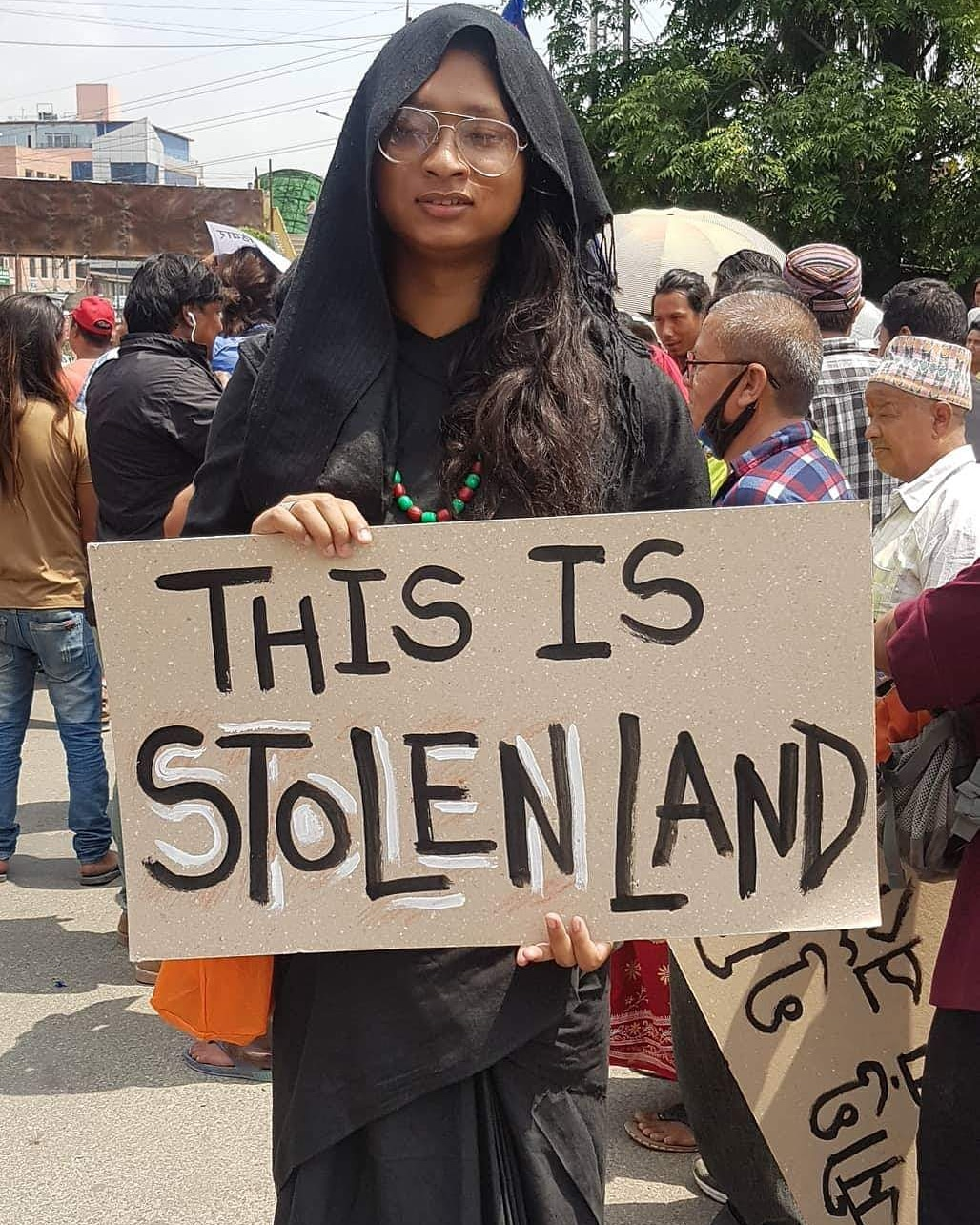
Kapali in 2019

Rukshana Kapali (Newar: रुक्शना कपाली; born 1999) is a Newar activist living in Nepal. Kapali campaigns for both intersex and LGBT rights and protection for the culture and language of the Newar people. Her court case regarding her right to identify as female rather than third gender went to the Supreme Court of Nepal and in November 2023, the court ruled in her favour.

== Early life and education ==
Rukshana Kapali was born in 1999 in Patan, Nepal. Her family is Newar and she grew up speaking the Newar language (Nepal Bhasa) at home rather than Nepali.

Kapali was assigned male at birth and whilst at school changed her gender to female. When she studied for Bachelor of Arts in Linguistics and Sociology at Tri-Chandra Multiple Campus in Kathmandu, she experienced difficulties in registering for exams because of her changed name and became an activist for transgender and human rights.

== Activism and career ==
Taking an intersectional approach, Kapali campaigned on both intersex and LGBT issues and protection for the culture and language of Newar people. She founded the Queer Youth Group with other people from the Kathmandu Valley. She blogs about her activism and has written on the subject of PoMSOGIESC (People of Marginalised Sexual Orientation, Gender Identity, Gender Expression and Sex Characteristics). Her protests have also been covered by media outlets such as The Kathmandu Post.

In 2021, Kapali went to the Supreme Court of Nepal in order to assert her right to identify as female rather than third gender as she had been compelled to do by the authorities. In November 2023, the court told Kapali she was correct before releasing the written judgement. Also in November 2023, she appeared on the BBC 100 Women list, alongside Amal Clooney and Michelle Obama.

In October 2024, Kapali was included in the TIME 100 Next list of the world's most influential rising leaders.

== See also ==
- LGBT rights in Nepal
