= Andrew Sparkes =

British diplomat

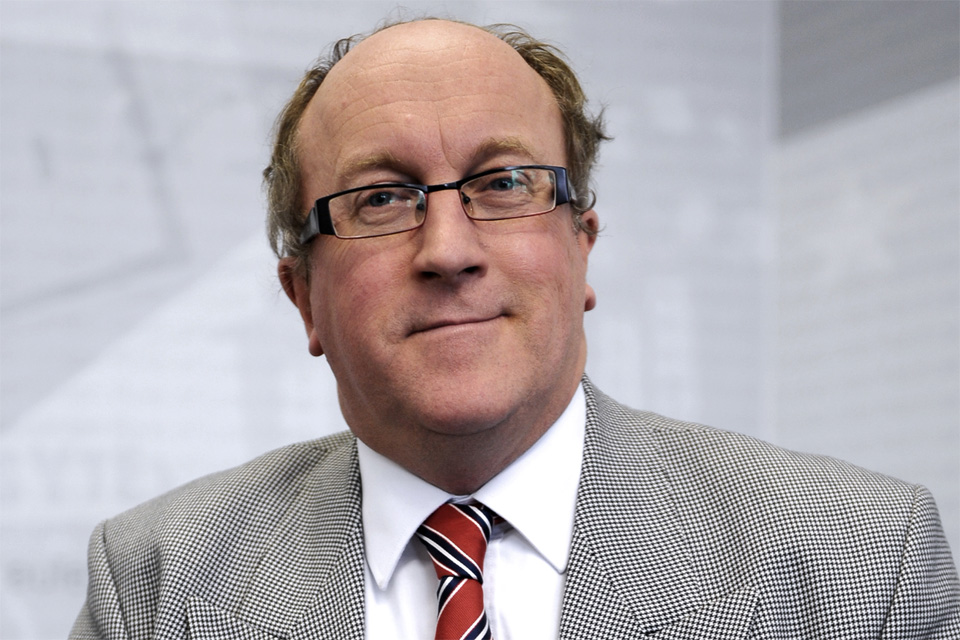
Andrew Sparkes

Andrew Sparkes CMG (born 4 July 1959) is a former British diplomat who was ambassador to the Democratic Republic of Congo, Kosovo and Nepal.

== Career ==
Andrew James Sparkes was educated at King Edward's School, Birmingham, Manchester Grammar School and Trinity Hall, Cambridge. He taught English in Japan 1981–82, then joined the Diplomatic Service. In his early career he served at Ankara, Bangkok, Jakarta and on secondment to the then Department of Trade and Industry.

Sparkes was Deputy High Commissioner to South Africa (and Consul-General for Johannesburg and Pretoria) 2001–04, Ambassador to the Democratic Republic of Congo 2004–07, and Ambassador to the Republic of Kosovo 2008–10. In 2010 he was seconded to the European Union as Deputy Head of the largest EU civilian mission in the world, the European Union Rule of Law Mission in Kosovo. In 2013 he was appointed ambassador to Nepal.

In 2014 Sparkes caused a diplomatic row after he sent an open letter to Constituent Assembly members on the occasion of Human Rights Day, at a time when the new Constitution of Nepal was being debated. His letter included the phrase "We encourage you to ensure that the right to change religion is protected ..." Hindu conservatives seized on it as "evidence of a Western conspiracy to spread Christianity in Nepal." Nepal's Foreign Minister, Pradip Kumar Gyawali however said, “We have proof that the relief package given to earthquake victims by some donors and NGOs also carried Bible and related literature,” in relation to humanitarian aid provided to the country in the aftermath of the April 2015 Nepal earthquake.

Sparkes resigned from the Diplomatic Service in April 2015. Since 2016 he has been a senior fellow (teacher) at Winchester College and a member of council of the Royal Society for Asian Affairs.

Sparkes was appointed CMG in the 2007 Birthday Honours.

Diplomatic posts
Preceded by James Atkinson	Ambassador to the Democratic Republic of Congo; 2004–2007	Succeeded by Nicholas Kay
Preceded by David Blunt	Ambassador to the Republic of Kosovo; 2008–2010	Succeeded by Ian Cliff
Preceded by John Tucknott	Ambassador to the Federal Democratic Republic of Nepal; 2013–2015	Succeeded by John Rankin
