= Pajani system =

System of appointing government officials in Nepal

The Pajani System was a system of appointing government officials in Nepal.

== History ==
The Pajani System has deep roots in history of Nepal and has been used by Licchavi, Malla, and Early Shah, Rana period rulers.

The Pajani System ended in late 1970s.

== Procedure ==
In the Pajani System, the Head of State could directly appoint, transfer or dismiss government servants. Annual Pajani ceremonies were held and re-appointment and dismissal of the officials was set for a period of one year, based on loyalty.

== See also ==
- Daudaha system
- Rana dynasty
- Rana palaces of Nepal
- Succession to the Nepalese throne
