= Kosovo–United Kingdom relations =

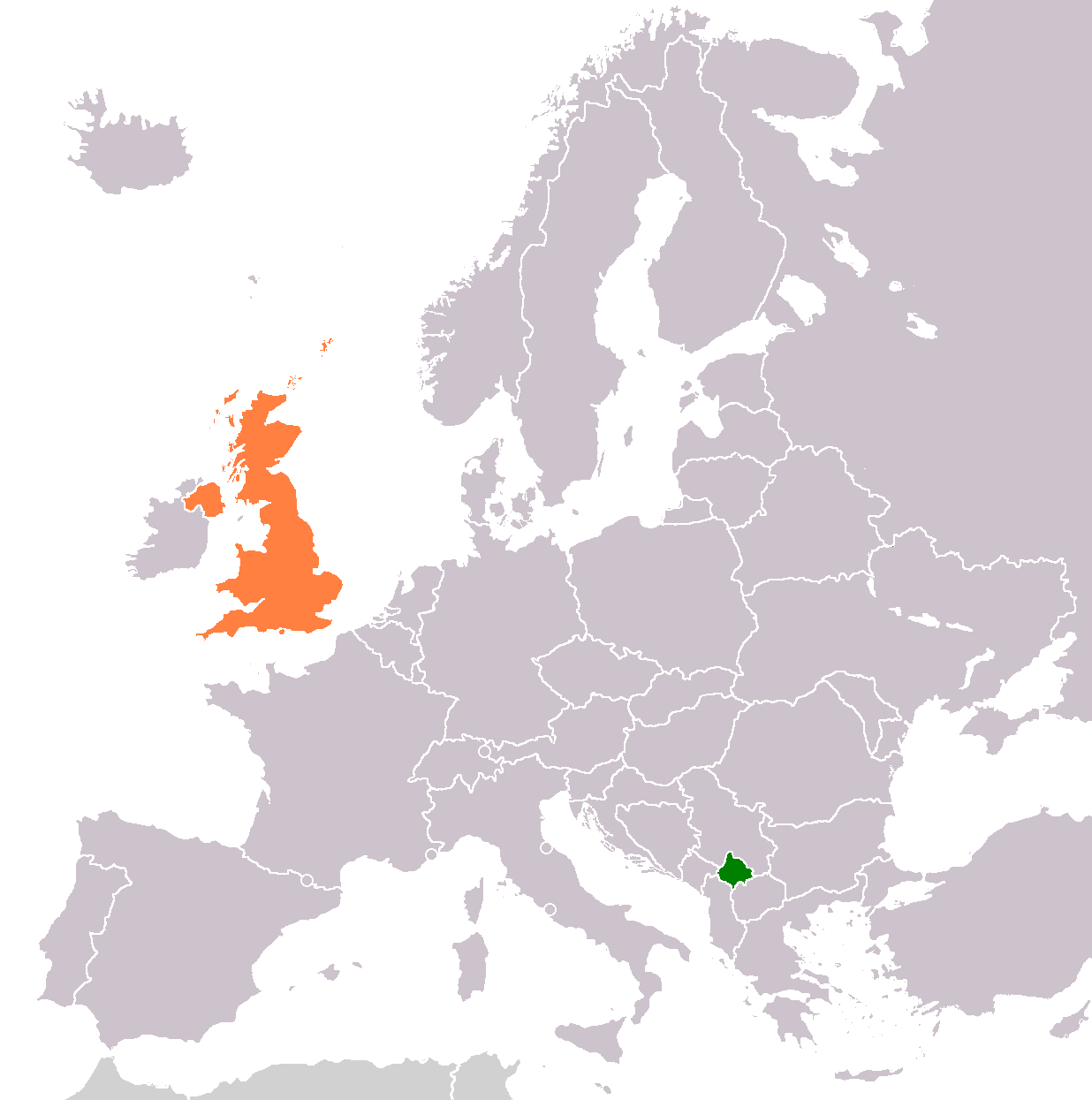

- Kosovo: United Kingdom

Diplomatic mission
- Embassy of Kosovo, London: Embassy of the United Kingdom, Pristina

Envoy
- Ambassador Ilir Kapiti: Ambassador Nicholas Abbott

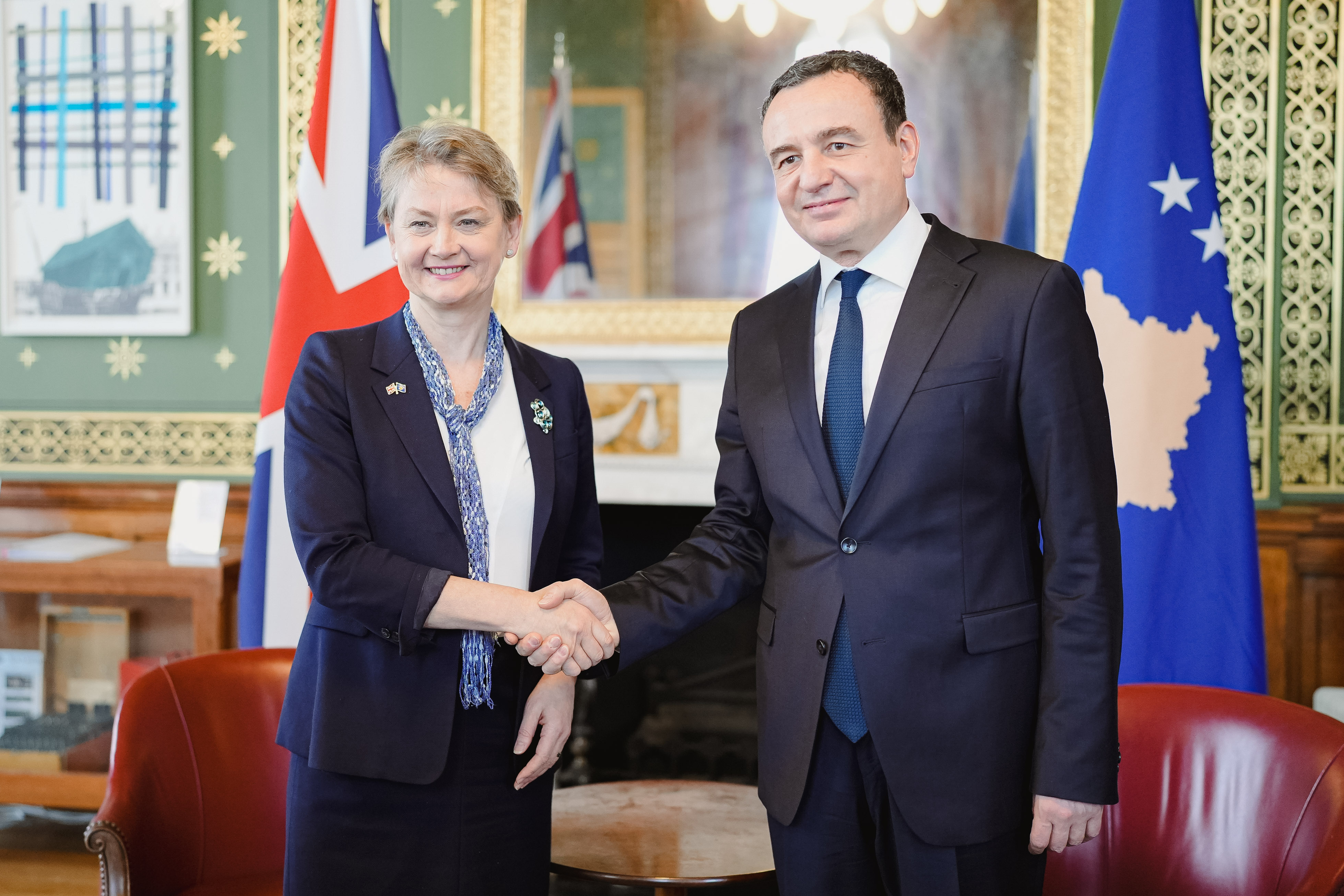
Foreign Secretary Yvette Cooper with Kosovan Prime Minister Albin Kurti in London, October 2025.

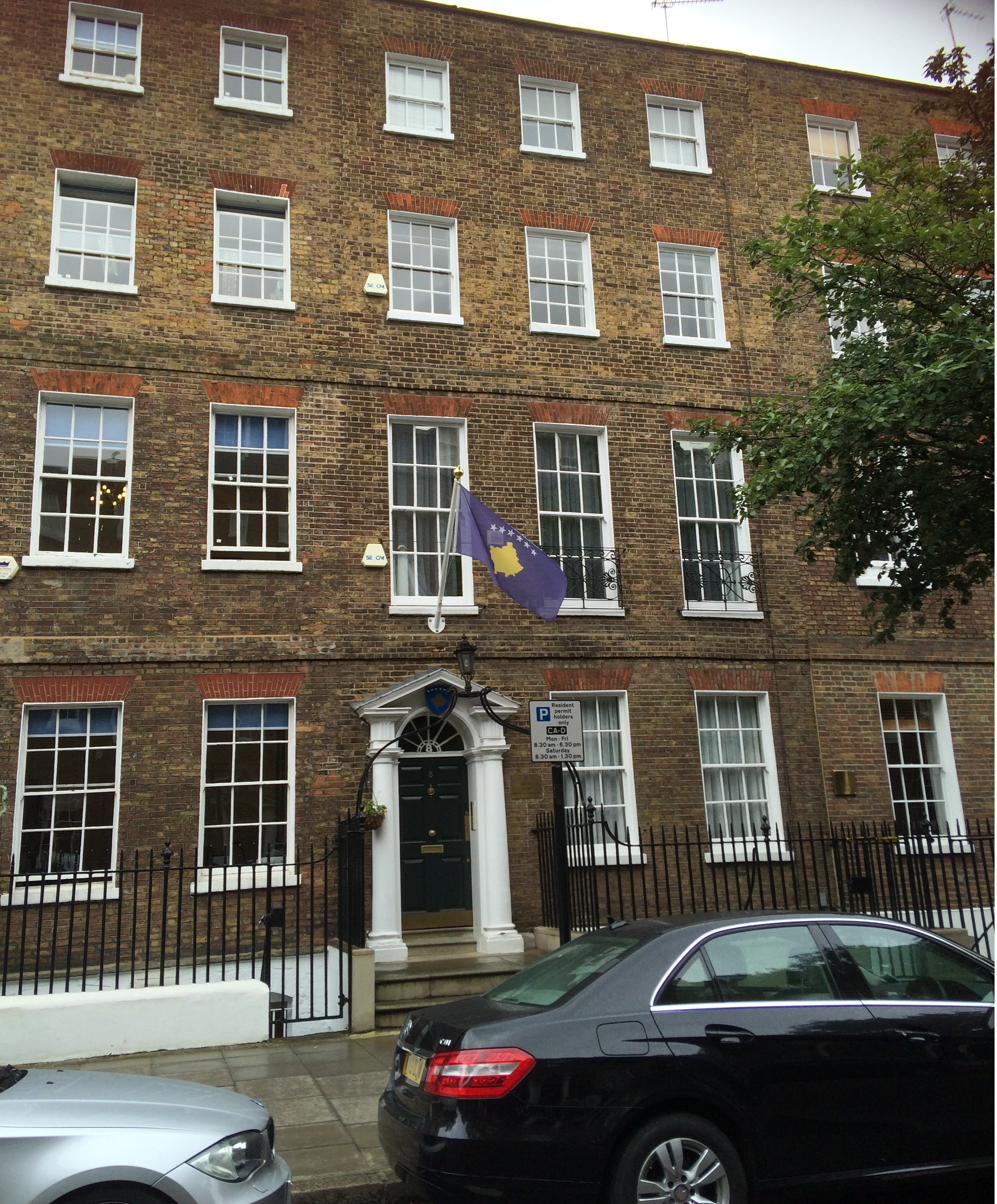
Kosovan embassy in London, United Kingdom.

Kosovo–United Kingdom relations are foreign and bilateral relations between the Republic of Kosovo and the United Kingdom of Great Britain and Northern Ireland. When Kosovo declared its independence from Serbia on 17 February 2008, the United Kingdom became one of the first countries to announce the official recognition of a sovereign Kosovo on 18 February 2008. The United Kingdom has had an embassy in Pristina since 5 March 2008. Kosovo has had an embassy in London since 1 October 2008. The two countries have very good and friendly relations.

== Economic relations ==
From 1 April 2016 until 30 December 2020, trade between Kosovo and the UK was governed by the Kosovo–European Union Stabilisation and Association Process, while the United Kingdom was a member of the European Union. Following the withdrawal of the United Kingdom from the European Union, the UK and Kosovo signed a continuity trade agreement on 3 December 2019, based on the EU free trade agreement; the agreement entered into force on 1 January 2021. Trade value between Kosovo and the United Kingdom was worth £13 million in 2022.

== Military relations ==
The United Kingdom participated in the 1999 NATO bombing of Yugoslavia, which resulted in a UN administration of Kosovo. The United Kingdom currently has 84 troops serving in Kosovo as peacekeepers in the NATO led Kosovo Force. Originally there were 19,000 British troops in KFOR. Mike Jackson was the first KFOR Commander from 12 June 1999 until 8 October 1999.

On 25 April 2008, the British Government announced that it would send a battle-group based on 2 Rifles, a light infantry battalion of about 600 soldiers, to help maintain public order to serve as Peacekeepers in EULEX, an EU Police, Civilian and Law Mission in Kosovo.

On 30 September 2023, it was reported that due to the build up of Serbian forces on the border between Kosovo and Serbia, the 1st Battalion of the Princess of Wales's Royal Regiment was sent to Kosovo as part of KFOR.

== Political relations ==
The United Kingdom was an important player in the events of 1999. The Kosovo War, which Prime Minister Tony Blair had advocated on moral grounds, was initially a failure when it relied solely on air strikes; he believed that the threat of a ground offensive, which Bill Clinton had initially ruled out, was necessary to convince Serbia's President Slobodan Milošević to withdraw. Blair ordered that 50,000 soldiers - most of the available British Army - should be made ready for action. Blair has visited Kosovo on several occasions since; other British Ministers who have had ministerial responsibility for policy towards Kosovo, such as Dennis MacShane, have also maintained their connections.

The disintegration of Yugoslavia and the end of the Cold War prompted the United Kingdom to shift its foreign policy in the Balkans, ending its support for Serbia in favour of building a unique bilateral relationship with Kosovo. The United Kingdom has acted as Kosovo's protector, spearheading efforts to build state institutions and establish it on the international stage.

== See also ==
- Foreign relations of Kosovo
- Foreign relations of the United Kingdom
- Kosovo-NATO relations
- Serbia–UK relations
- United Kingdom–Yugoslavia relations
- Embassy of Kosovo, London
- List of diplomatic missions of the United Kingdom
- List of diplomatic missions in Kosovo
