= Succession to the Nepalese throne =

Official order of succession of the Rana Dynasty of Nepal

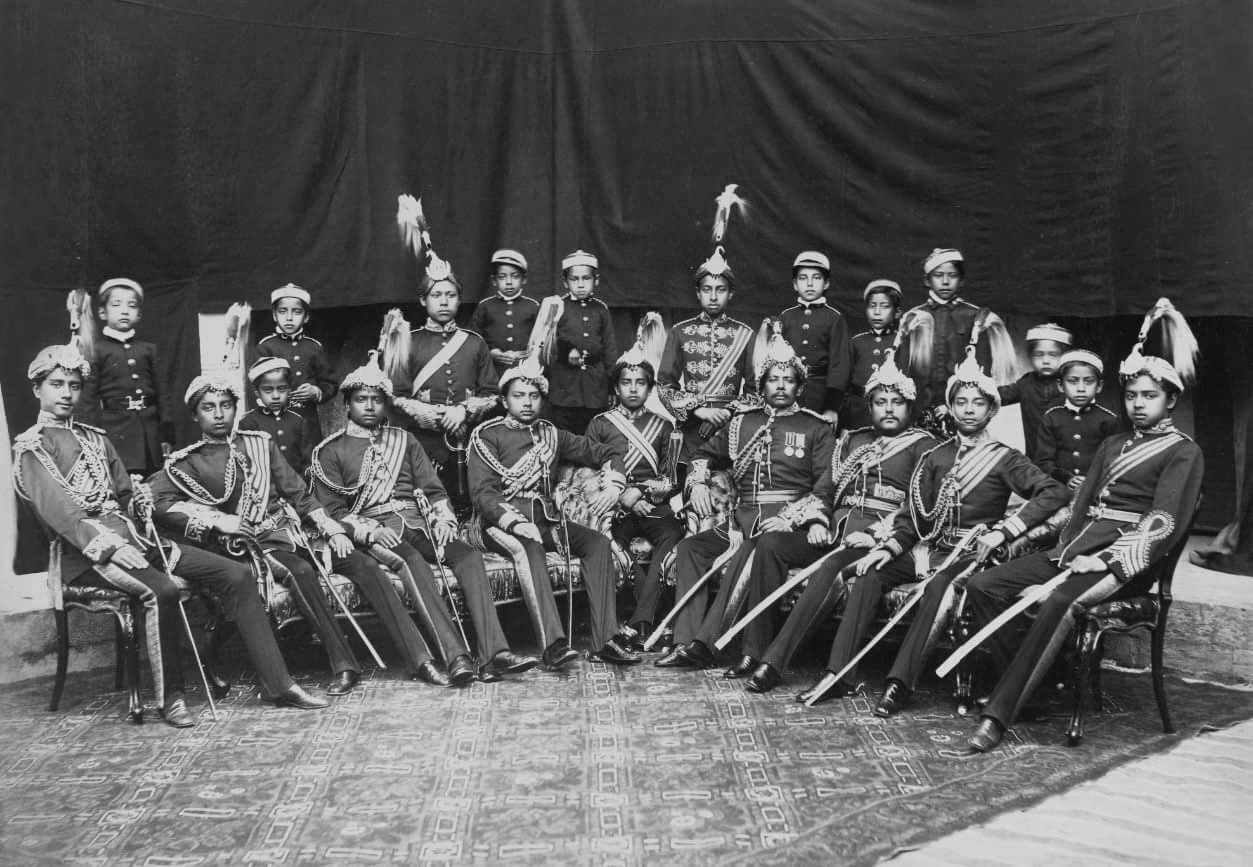
Dhir Shamshers Rana and all of his 17 sons. The Rolls of Succession were agnatic.

The Rolls of Succession in Rana or Rollkram Pratha was the official order of succession of the Rana Dynasty of Nepal. This order was regulated not only through descent, but also by lineage. It was established by Jung Bahadur Rana as a formal ranking of all of his descendants in relation to their hereditary rights to the office of prime minister, with no legal mechanism for changing the government.

== Jung Bahadur Rana ==
King Surendra issued a royal decree (sanad) giving Jung Bahadur authority over internal administration and foreign relations. Jung Bahadur was declared the "great king" (maharajah) of Kaski and Lamjung districts, serving as their independent ruler, and the right to use the honorific term shri which is "three times" (Sri Teen) in his name. In his 1856 sanad, King Surendra stated that succession would pass to Jung's seven brothers and then to his sons and nephew in order of seniority.

== Chandra Shamshir's revision ==
Prime Minister Chandra Shumsher JBR revised and re-shuffled the Rolls of Succession and divided the Rana clan into 3 categories; A, B, and C according to the stature of the purity of lineage.

- A Class: those born of legitimate high caste wives.
- B Class: those born of legitimate married wives from a secondary high caste or those born from marriage with a royal household member.
- C Class: those born of illegitimate wives from a lower caste.

A Class were eligible to be Prime Minister and/or the highest military and administrative officials, whereas B and C Class Rana could only reach the level of Colonel.

== Juddha Shamshir's revision ==
In March 1934, Juddha Shumsher JBR expelled C Class from the roll of succession.

== See also ==
- Daudaha system
- Pajani System
- Rana palaces of Nepal
- Rana Administration
