= David Barker (filmmaker) =

American film editor, screenwriter, and director

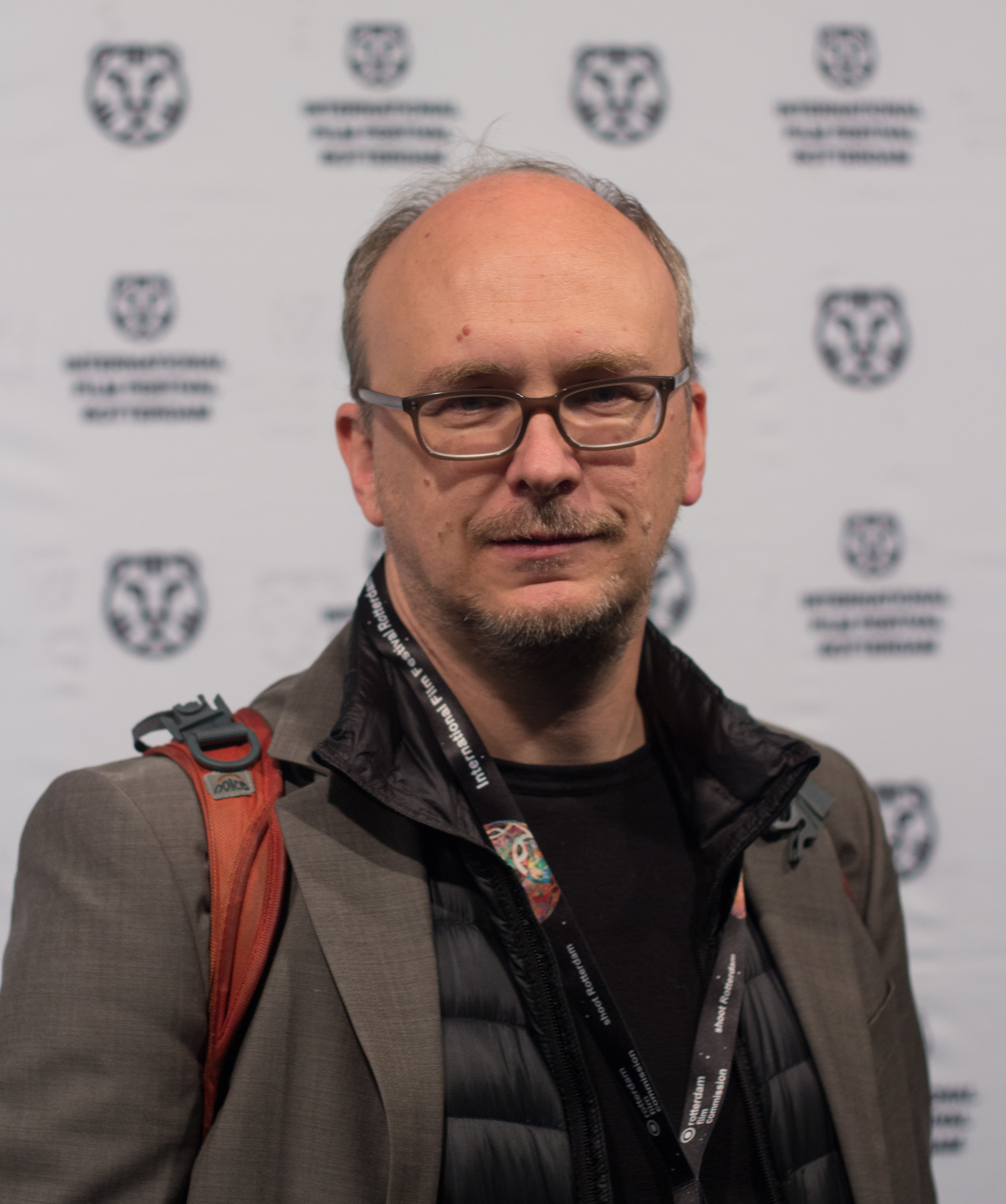
- Born: U.S.
- Occupations: Editor, screenwriter and director
- Years active: 1999–present

David Barker is an American film editor, screenwriter, and director. He is known for editing the films Chasing Summer (2026), Birds of Paradise (2021), The Edge of Democracy (2019) and White Sun (2016), as well as for directing the film Daylight (2010).

== Career ==
Barker studied philosophy and anthropology before pursuing a career in film. He has taught as a visiting professor at Brown University, Bard College, and the University of Texas at Austin.

Barker made his feature directorial debut with Afraid of Everything (1999); the film premiered at the Sundance Film Festival. He later directed the short film Seven Days (2004) and the feature Daylight (2010).

From 2001 to 2003, Barker served as artistic director of the Cinematexas International Short Film Festival, founded by Athina Rachel Tsangari.

Barker is a member of the American Cinema Editors (ACE). He has worked primarily as an editor on documentary and narrative films. His editing and writing credits include White Sun (2016), The Edge of Democracy (2019), Shirley (2020), Birds of Paradise(2021), and Apocalypse in the Tropics (2024), as well as episodes of the miniseries Stolen Youth: Inside the Cult at Sarah Lawrence (2023).

== Selected filmography ==
| Year | Title | Contribution | Note |
|---|---|---|---|
| 1999 | Afraid of Everything | Director, writer and producer | |
| 2010 | Daylight | Director, writer and producer | |
| 2011 | Here | Editor | |
| 2012 | Highway | Editor | |
| 2014 | Thou Wast Mild and Lovely | Editor and co-writer | |
| 2015 | Funny Bunny | Editor | |
| 2016 | Approaching the Unknown | Editor | |
| 2016 | White Sun | Editor and writer | |
| 2017 | The Reagan Show | Editor | Documentary |
| 2019 | The Edge of Democracy | Editor and co-writer | Documentary |
| 2020 | Shirley | Editor | |
| 2021 | Birds of Paradise | Editor | |
| 2023 | Stolen Youth: Inside the Cult at Sarah Lawrence | Editor | TV miniseries (3 episodes) |
| 2024 | Apocalypse in the Tropics | Editor and co-writer | Documentary |
| 2024 | Pooja, Sir | Writer | |
| 2024 | A Want in Her | Writer | |
| 2026 | Chasing Summer | Editor | |

== Awards and nominations ==
| Year | Result | Award | Category | Work | Ref. |
|---|---|---|---|---|---|
| 2015 | Won | Brooklyn Film Festival | Best Editing | Funny Bunny | |
| 2018 | Nominated | Cinema Eye Honors | Outstanding Achievement in Editing | The Reagan Show | |
| 2019 | Nominated | Critics' Choice Documentary Awards | Best Narration | The Edge of Democracy | |
| 2019 | Nominated | International Documentary Association | Best Writing | The Edge of Democracy | |
| 2025 | Nominated | International Documentary Association | Best Narration | Apocalypse in the Tropics | |
| 2025 | Won | Critics' Choice Documentary Awards | Best Writing | Apocalypse in the Tropics | |
