= John Tucknott =

British diplomat

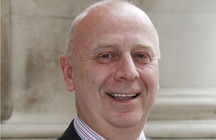
John Tucknott

John Anthony Tucknott CMG MBE (born 2 January 1958) is a British diplomat.

He was educated at Bournemouth School and King's College London (MA, International Studies). Tucknott served as the British Ambassador to Nepal from 2010 to 2013, British Deputy High Commissioner to Pakistan and Director Trade and Investment Pakistan from 2013 to 2016, and the British Deputy Ambassador to Iraq from 2017 until September 2020. He is also a UK Trade Champion.

Tucknott was appointed Companion of the Order of St Michael and St George (CMG) in the 2020 New Year Honours for services to British foreign policy.

Diplomatic posts
Preceded by Andrew Hall	British Ambassador to Nepal; 2010–2013	Succeeded by Andrew Sparkes
