= Deepak Rauniyar =

Nepalese film director

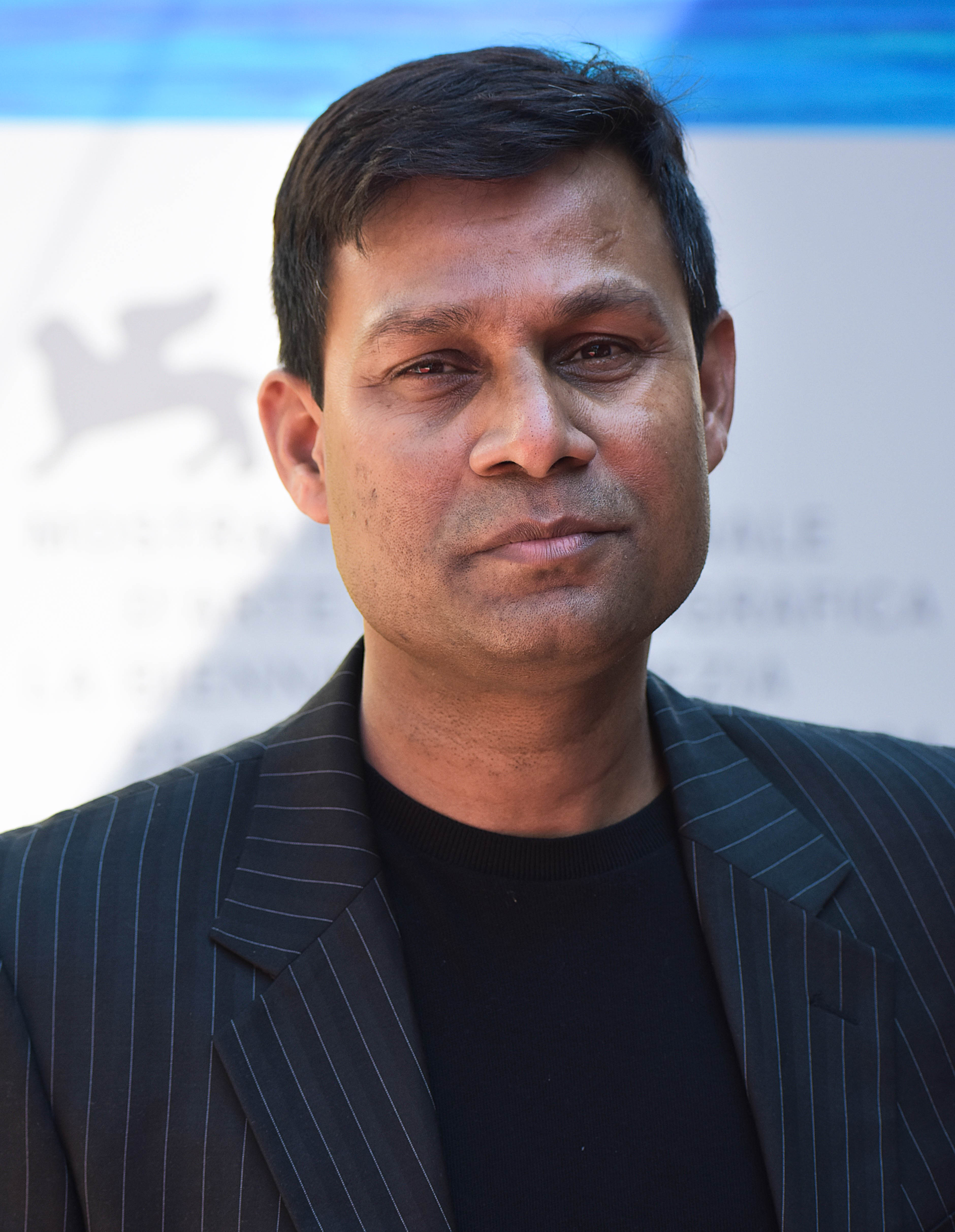
- Rauniyar at the 81st Venice International Film Festival in 2024
- Born: 29 August 1978 (age 48); Saptari, Nepal
- Other name: Rauniyar
- Citizenship: Nepali
- Years active: 2008–present
- Known for: White Sun (2016); Highway (2012)

Deepak Rauniyar (Nepali: दीपक रौनियार; born on 29 August 1978) is a Nepalese director, writer and producer. He is one of the few internationally acclaimed cinema directors from Nepal. He rose to prominence in 2012 as the director of Highway, the first Nepali movie to be screened at a major international festival – the Berlin International Film Festival. His second international release, White Sun (2016), was named Best Asian Feature Film at the Singapore International Film Festival and resulted in his being named in The New York Times as one of "The 9 New Directors You Need to Watch".

== Filmography ==
- Threshold (2008)
- Pooja (2010)
- Highway (2012)
- White Sun (2016)
- Pooja, Sir (2024)
