= Highway (2012 Nepali film) =

Nepali anthological film

- Theatrical release poster
- Directed by: Deepak Rauniyar
- Screenplay by: Abinash Bikram Shah
- Story by: Kedar Sharma; Khagendra Lamichhane; Deepak Rauniyar
- Produced by: Deepak Rauniyar (Producer); Susan Rockfeller (Associate Producer); Jay Maharjan (Associate Producer); Jamie Mateus-tique (Associate Producer); Dr. Lonim P Dixit (Executive Producer); Dr. Sameer M Dixit (Executive Producer); Joslyn Barnes (co-producer); Danny Glover (co-producer)
- Starring: Saugat Malla; Reecha Sharma; Dayahang Rai; Karma Shakya; Bhumika Shrestha
- Cinematography: Apal Singh; Additional cinematography: Jyoti Keshar Simha, Nishant Purohit
- Edited by: David Butler; Kimberley Hassett; Rita Meher; Deepak Rauniyar
- Music by: Richard Horowitz, Vivek Maddala
- Production companies: Aadi Productions; Louverture Films
- Release dates: 10 February 2012 (Berlin International Film Festival); 20 July 2012 (Nepal)
- Country: Nepal
- Language: Nepali
- Budget: 11 Lakhs
- Box office: 8 Lakhs

Highway is a Nepali anthological Film produced by Aadi Productions in association with Louverture Films. Highway was officially selected for and screened at the 62nd Berlin International Film Festival. It was critically acclaimed but it did not perform well at the box office. 'Highway' was premiered on YouTube on 28 January 2025

== Plot ==
Set against the backdrop of the new culture of bandhs (general strikes) that frequently immobilize post-conflict Nepal, Highway explores five different relationship stories that become intertwined during an ill-fated bus journey from eastern Nepal to the capital Kathmandu. While the passengers - each of whom urgently needs to be somewhere else – await a resolution to the combustible strike that is blocking the only passable road, the film explores the psychological and spiritual bandhs that many Nepalese contend with.

== Cast ==
- Saugat Malla as Ronit
- Reecha Sharma as Kavita
- Dayahang Rai as Manoj
- Asha Maya Magrati as Radhika
- Shristi Ghimire as Pooja
- Karma Shakya as Abiral
- Rajan Khatiwada as Driver
- Rabindra Mishra as Doctor
- Nirmala Rai as Mahili Gurung
- Eelum Dixit as Pratiek
- Bhumika Shrestha

== Soundtrack ==
The soundtrack of Highway, titled Paplu (Laija Re), was released on Kantipur FM on 26 October 2011. It was composed by Manoj Kumar KC of 1974 AD with lyrics penned by Bhupendra Khadka. Subhani Moktan recorded the song for the film.
