= List of ambassadors of the United Kingdom to Kosovo =

British Embassy, Pristina
- Location: Pristina, Kosovo
- Address: 177 Lidhja e Pejës, Pristina, 10000; Kosovo
- Ambassador: Jonathan Hargreaves
- Website: Official Website

His Majesty's Ambassador to the Republic of Kosovo is the United Kingdom's foremost diplomatic representative in the Republic of Kosovo, and is in charge of the British mission in Pristina.

The Republic of Kosovo declared its independence on 17 February 2008. The United Kingdom recognised the Republic of Kosovo as an independent state the following day and Mr David Blunt, who had been in Pristina since 2006 as head of the British office, was appointed the first ambassador.

== Embassy ==
The British Embassy in Pristina (Albanian: Ambasada Britanike në Kosovë, Serbian: Британска амбасада у Косову) was established on 5 March 2008. It is located at 177 Lidhja e Pejës, Pristina, Kosovo, a building which also hosts the Japanese Embassy, the International Organization for Migration's office in Kosovo and the headquarters of the European Union Rule of Law Mission in Kosovo.

== Ambassadors ==
- 2008: David Blunt
- 2008–2010: Andrew Sparkes
- 2011–2015: Ian Cliff
- 2015–2019: Ruairí O'Connell
- 2019–2024: Nicholas Abbott
- 2024–present: Jonathan Hargreaves

== See also ==
- Kosovo–United Kingdom relations
- Embassy of the United Kingdom, Pristina
