= Sunil Babu Pant =

Nepali human rights activist, monk and politician

- सुनीलबाबु पन्त

Member of 1st Nepalese Constituent Assembly
- In office 2008–2013

Personal details
- Born: June 28, 1971 (age 55) Gorkha District, Nepal
- Party: Communist Party of Nepal (Unified Marxist-Leninist)
- Education: Belarusian State University

Sunil Babu Pant (Nepali: सुनीलबाबु पन्त; born 28 June 1971) is a Nepali human rights activist, monk, and former politician who served as a member of the Nepalese Constituent Assembly between 2008 and 2013. Pant's campaigning for LGBT rights led to the Supreme Court of Nepal giving legal recognition to Nepal's third gender in addition to decriminalising homosexuality and permitting same-sex marriage. In 2021, Pant converted to Buddhism and began training as a monk, going by the name Bhikshu Kashyap.

== Early life ==
Pant was born into a Brahmin family in Gorkha District, Gandaki Province, Nepal. He graduated from Laxmi Secondary School in Gorkha before obtaining a master's degree in computer science from the Belarusian State University in Minsk. He subsequently enrolled at Hong Kong University of Science and Technology but dropped out after six months, instead volunteering to help victims of the 1999 Odisha cyclone.

== Activism ==
Pant came out publicly at the age of 29, and in 2001 formed the Blue Diamond Society, Nepal's first LGBT organisation. Its initial focus was on preventative work concerning HIV/AIDS, but it has since progressed into monitoring and reporting on human rights abuses. As of 2009, the Blue Diamond Society had 120,000 members and offices in 29 locations across Nepal.

In November 2006, Pant was among 29 human rights campaigners who signed the Yogyakarta Principles, a document concerning human rights in the areas of sexual orientation and gender identity; he has said that he feels that while Nepal is progressive in terms of its understanding of gender, that it lacks similar understanding when it comes to sexuality. In 2008, the Supreme Court of Nepal, in Sunil Babu Pant and Others v. Government of Nepal and Others, granted legal recognition to Nepal's third gender, in addition to decriminalising homosexuality and permitting same-sex marriage. Pant was noted during his campaigning prior to the decision for promoting the idea that same-sex marriage would boost Nepal's economy due to the impact of wedding tourism.

For two years, Pant hosted Pahichaan, a television programme where he explained concepts pertaining to the LGBT community, in addition to the issues facing them. In 2012, Pant wrote an open letter to Mark Zuckerberg and Chris Hughes, urging them to allow Facebook users to list their gender as "other". He also led an ultimately unsuccessful bid for Nepal to host the Gay Games.

== Political career ==
Following Pant's successful campaigning and his subsequent popularity among LGBT voters, the Communist Party of Nepal (United) offered him one of the five proportional support seats it had secured in the constituent assembly following its 2008 establishment. As a politician, Pant served as a member of the Fundamental Rights Committee, and was successful in securing full protection for the LGBT community in Nepal's draft constitution.

In 2013, Pant was criticised for receiving two salaries, one for his work as a parliamentarian, and another for serving as the director of the Blue Diamond Society; he resigned from the latter role in June 2013. That same year, Pant defected to the Communist Party of Nepal (Unified Marxist-Leninist), though he was not ultimately granted one of the 175 seats they won in the subsequent election, due to their policy not to permit parliamentarians who had served in the previous assembly. Pant said he had already intended to leave parliament due to his caring commitments for his partner.

== Other activities ==
Pant founded the Peace Environment Development NGO, a non-governmental agency working to address climate change. He also established Pink Mountain, Nepal's first gay travel agency. In June 2011, Pant conducted the first public gay marriage ceremony in Nepal.

In 2020, Pant ended his political career and converted to Buddhism, training as a monk in Sri Lanka and choosing the religious name Bhikshu Kashyap. As a monk, Pant has been critical of the stance among some Buddhists that intersex people should not be included within the religion.

In 2023, Pant's short film Blue Flower premiered at the Kashish Film Festival. It follows a closeted gay man living in rural Nepal who is forced to marry a woman.

== Recognition ==
Pant was nominated by Anette Trettebergstuen and Håkon Haugli for the 2014 Nobel Peace Prize.

In 2016, The Guardian named Pant as one of their "#LGBTChange heroes". That same year, the documentary film Out Run premiered, directed by S. Leo Chiang and Johnny Simons. Documenting LGBT activist and Ladlad leader Bemz Benedito's bid to become the first transgender woman elected to the Philippine Congress, the directors said they had been inspired to make the film after reading an article about Pant.

== See also ==
- LGBT rights in Nepal
- Blue Diamond Society
