= Vivek Maddala =

American music composer

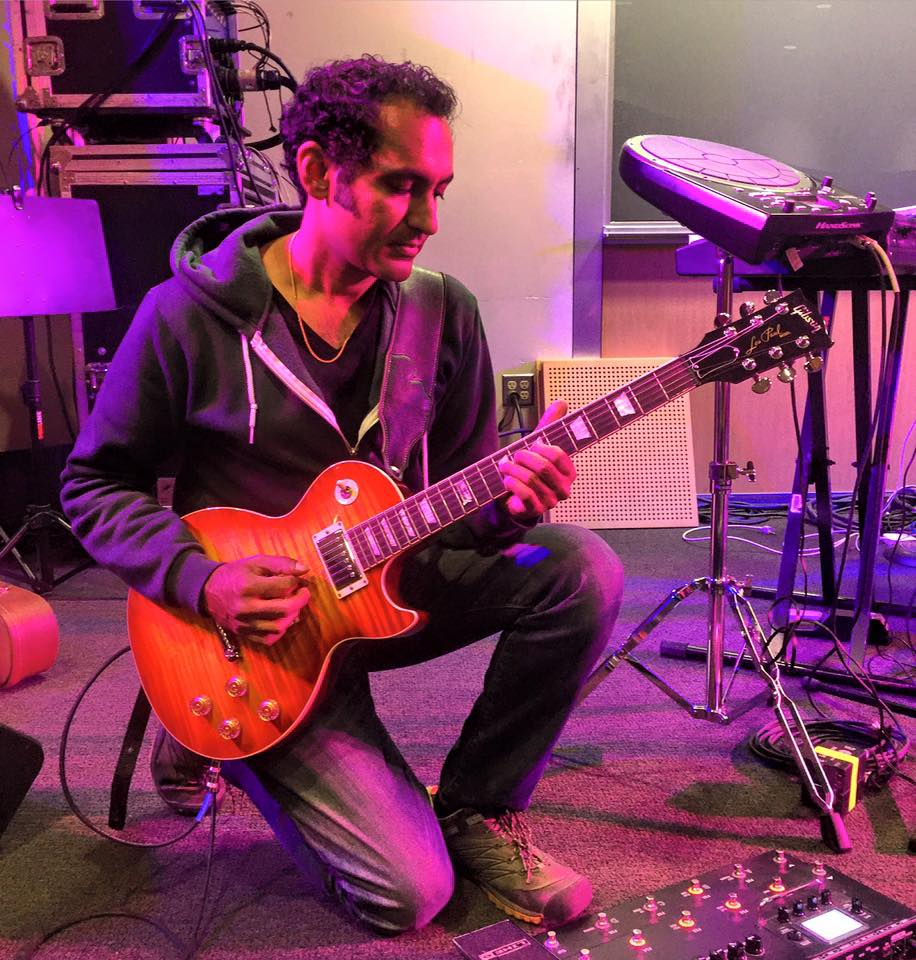
- Vivek Maddala during a 2016 soundcheck

Background information
- Born: Rochester, New York, U.S.
- Genres: Film score, classical, big band, jazz, rock, funk, R&B, world
- Occupations: Composer, musician, record producer, recording engineer
- Instruments: Drums, piano, guitar, bass, Hammond organ, conductor
- Website: maddala.com

Vivek Maddala is a 4-time Emmy-winning composer who focuses on writing music for feature films, theater and dance productions, and television. He is known for composing music scores for films such as Kaboom, Highway, and the Peabody-winning American Revolutionary: The Evolution of Grace Lee Boggs, as well as for silent film restorations for Turner Classic Movies, including a 90-minute score for the Greta Garbo film The Mysterious Lady (2002). Additionally, Maddala writes, produces, and performs as a multi-instrumentalist with various recording artists. He is a Sundance Lab Fellow for film composition, and has had work premiere at the Cannes, Toronto, Berlin, and Sundance film festivals. Maddala has received six Emmy nominations, with four Daytime Emmy wins in the category of "Outstanding Music Direction and Composition."

Maddala has served as Composer-in-Residence at Columbia College Chicago and has guest lectured in various graduate and undergraduate music programs. Since 2021, he has authored a column for Stereogum where he analyzes pop music for general audiences from the perspective of a composer and producer.

== Personal life ==
Vivek Maddala is the son of economist G. S. Maddala. He began playing music at age 3 and later studied jazz performance at the Berklee College of Music. He earned degrees in electrical engineering from the Georgia Institute of Technology and pursued graduate studies at the University of Washington.

== Awards ==
- Grand Prize winner of the Young Film Composers Competition
- ASCAP Film Scoring Fellowship
- JPFolks Soundtrack Album of the Year for The Patsy
- Gold Medals at the Park City Film Music Festival for Wild Oranges, They Turned Our Desert Into Fire and Grasshopper
- BMI Conducting Fellowship
- 2010 Council of Outstanding Young Engineering Alumni
- 2014 Hollywood Music in Media Awards (nomination), Best Score – Documentary
- 2017 Daytime Emmy Awards (nomination), Outstanding Music Direction and Composition
- 2018 Daytime Emmy Awards (win), Outstanding Music Direction and Composition
- 2019 Annie Award (nomination), Outstanding Achievement for Music in an Animated Television/Broadcast Production
- 2019 Daytime Emmy Awards (win), Outstanding Music Direction and Composition
- 2020 Annie Award (nomination), Outstanding Achievement for Music in an Animated Television/Broadcast Production
- 2020 Daytime Emmy Awards (win), Outstanding Music Direction and Composition
- 2021 Daytime Emmy Awards (win), Outstanding Music Direction and Composition
- 2022 Children's and Family Emmy Awards (nomination), Outstanding Music Direction and Composition
- 2022 Hollywood Music in Media Awards (nomination), Best Score – Streamed Animated Film
