= National Code of Nepal =

The National Code, 1963 मुलुकी ऐन, २०२०

HM the King Mahendra
- Long title: The National Code
- Citation: Act No. 67 of 2019 (1963)
- Territorial extent: Whole of Nepal
- Enacted by: HM the King Mahendra
- Enacted: 12 April 1963
- Royal assent: 12 April 1963
- Commenced: 17 August 1963

Repeals
- Contract Act, 1966; Evidence Act, 1974; Some Nepal Acts Repealing Act, 1990; Court Proceedings Related Some Nepal Acts Amendment Act, 1990; Children Act, 1992; Some Nepal Acts Amendment Act, 1993; Some Nepal Acts Amendment Act, 1999; Slaughtering House and Meat Inspection Act, 1999; Punishment Related Some Nepal Acts Amendment Act, 1999; Contract Act, 2000; Court Proceedings Related Some Nepal Acts Amendment Act, 2002; Some Nepal Acts Amendment Act, 2006; Some Nepal Acts to Maintain Gender Equality Amendment Act, 2006; Republic Strengthening and Some Nepal Laws Amendment Act, 2010

Amended by
- National Code (First Amendment) Act, 1964; National Code (Second Amendment) Act, 1967; National Code (Third Amendment) Act, 1968; National Code (Fourth Amendment) Act, 1970; National Code (Fifth Amendment) Act, 1974; National Code (Sixth Amendment) Act, 1976; National Code (Seventh Amendment) Act, 1978; National Code (Eighth Amendment) Act, 1985; National Code (Ninth Amendment) Act, 1986; National Code (Tenth Amendment) Act, 1993; National Code (Eleventh Amendment) Act, 2002; National Code (Twelfth Amendment) Act, 2007
- Status: Repealed

The National Code (Nepali: मुलुकी ऐन; Muluki Ain, literally: Nation's Code) is a single comprehensive code that includes criminal and civil code along with the code of procedures of Nepal. The National Code has been replaced by the Muluki Criminal Code and its Code of Procedures and the Muluki Civil Code and its Code of Procedures on August 17, 2018. Officially titled The National Penal Code, 2074 (2017), it exclusively deals with crimes and its punishment. On the other hand, the National Civil Code, 2074 (2017) deals with family law which includes marriage and divorce, property law, contract law, and more.

== History ==
The Manav Nyaya Shastra (Nepali: मानव न्याय शास्त्र; Newari: Nyayavikasini; literally: Human Justice Code) is the first codified law of Nepal. It was written during the Malla Dynasty in the 14th century. This is believed to be the root of structured law system in Nepal.

The Mulukī Ain of 1854 is the foundational legal text for modern Nepal. The laws remained largely unchanged until 1963. In 2018, the Mulukī Ain was replaced by the new criminal and civil codes, and their respective codes of procedure.

== Outline ==
It was enacted by king Mahendra. The General Code is divided into the following parts and chapters:

- Preamble
- Part 1

On Preliminary Matters

- Part 2

Chapter 1: On Court Proceedings
Chapter 2: On Punishment

- Part 3

Chapter 1: On Document Scrutiny
Chapter 2: On Guarantee
Chapter 3: On Bona Vacantia
Chapter 4: On Wages
Chapter 5: On Pauper
Chapter 6: On Lost and Found Quadruped
Chapter 7: On Trusts
Chapter 8: On Cultivation of Land
Chapter 9: On Land Evictions
Chapter 10: On Encroachment of Land
Chapter 11: On Construction of Buildings
Chapter 12: On Husband and Wife
Chapter 13: On Partition
Chapter 14: On Women's Share and Property
Chapter 15: On Adoption
Chapter 16: On Inheritance
Chapter 17: On General Transactions
Chapter 18: On Bailment
Chapter 19: On Donation and Gift
Chapter 20: On Insolvency/Bankruptcy
Chapter 21: On Registration of Deeds
Chapter 22: On Default of Payment

- Part 4

Chapter 1: On Forged Document (Forgery)
Chapter 2: On Looting
Chapter 3: On Cheating
Chapter 4: On Theft/Stealing
Chapter 5: On Arson
Chapter 6: On Counterfeiting
Chapter 7: On Quadruped
Chapter 8: On Illegal Detention
Chapter 8A: On Kidnapping/Abduction and Hostage Taking
Chapter 9: On Hurt/Battery
Chapter 10: On Homicide
Chapter 11: On Human Trafficking
Chapter 12: On Medical Treatment
Chapter 13: On Intention of Sex
Chapter 14: On Rape
Chapter 15: On Incest
Chapter 16: On Bestiality
Chapter 17: On Marriage
Chapter 18: On Adultery
Chapter 19: On Decency/Etiquette

- Part 5

Repeal
