= Blue Diamond Society =

LGBT rights organisation in Nepal

- Abbreviation: BDS
- Formation: 2001
- Type: Non-Profit Organization
- Purpose: As a community-based organization, the Blue Diamond Society aims to educate and assist with the sexual health, human rights, and the well-being of gender and sexual minorities in Nepal.
- Headquarters: Kathmandu
- Location: Dhumbarahi Height, Kathmandu, Nepal (Head office)
- Founder/Director: Sunil Babu Pant
- Website: http://bds.org.np

The Blue Diamond Society (BDS; Nepali: नील हीरा समाज) is an LGBT rights organization in Nepal. It was established in 2001 to advocate for change in the existing laws against homosexuality and to advocate for the rights of Nepal's marginalized gay, transgender, and other sexual minority communities. The Blue Diamond Society also aims to educate Nepalese society on proper sexual health, to advocate with local governments for queer minorities, to encourage the artful expression of LGBTQ+ youth, and to document violence against Nepalese queers. Another of its contributions to Nepal's LGBTQ+ communities is to provide care, counseling, and services to victims of HIV/AIDS. The BDS has also recorded various abuses against the community ranging from physical and verbal abuse and discrimination inflicted in workplaces and healthcare facilities.

The Blue Diamond Society is currently led by Executive Director Manisha Dhakal and was founded and led until 2013 by Sunil Babu Pant, the first gay legislator in Nepal's history and one of 29 experts at the meeting for The Yogyakarta Principles.

One of the Blue Diamond Society's greatest achievements occurred in 2007 when Pant and fellow human rights activists filed a case with Nepal's Supreme Court that led to a verdict by the Court ordering the government to repeal all laws that explicitly discriminate against members of the LGBT community. The Court also ordered the government to draft laws to legally recognize gay marriage. In 2015, Nepal approved a new constitution that guaranteed equal rights to all the genders; however, despite the laws, the LGBT+ community still faces discrimination and abuse and is least represented in the country.

In 2018, the Blue Diamond Society currently has over 700 staff and forty offices throughout Nepal. The head office is located in Dhumbarahi Height, Kathmandu.

== The Struggle for LGBT Rights ==
In April 2007, the Blue Diamond Society, MITINI Nepal, Cruse AIDS Nepal, and Parichaya Nepal, all organizations representing lesbians, gays, and "people of the third gender", filed a writ petition under Article 107(2) of the Interim Constitution of Nepal demanding representation and laws that provide protection to the LGBT community, thus prohibiting any discrimination on the basis of sexual orientation and gender identity. Nepal's citizenship card system provided benefits to all the citizens such as ration cards, passports, residency cards, etc. However, those who identified themselves within the third gender were denied these rights by the officials.

The Government of Nepal dismissed the petition claiming it to be based on hypothesis and assumptions and devoid of any proper examples of those who were treated in a discriminatory manner. The Court also claimed that the Interim Constitution provides enough protection therefore making a separate law based on sexual orientation is not required. The petitioners, including Sunil Babu Pant, argued that people of the third gender weren't treated equally. It was the responsibility of the state to provide identity documents, including birth certificates, citizenship certificates, passports, and voter identity cards because without identity cards, people of the third gender were deprived of education and other public benefits and were vulnerable and disadvantaged.

After a struggle, Court came to the conclusion that sexual orientation was a natural process rather than the result of "mental perversion" or "emotional and psychological disorder". It rejected the notion that people of the third sex were "sexual perverts". The government also addressed the issue of same-sex marriage which the Nepalese law observed as "unnatural coitus". The Court decided that it is appropriate that same-sex marriage is decriminalized and de-stigmatized. Also, laws were introduced to ensure that all the genders are provided equal rights. This resulted in new citizenship cards which have column for the third gender. Blue Diamond society played an important role in this movement and has been a major LGBT organization ever since.

As an organization, Blue Diamond Society faced various hurdles as it wasn't given the status of an NGO for sexual minorities which were not recognized under the Constitution. Therefore, it was introduced as sexual health program and later established itself as a full-fledged LGBT organization. Despite the legal and liberal system supporting the community, there is still very conservative especially when it comes to sexuality.

== Visions ==
The society's visions are to create a society that respects and values each sexual and gender minorities, where every person of a sexual and gender minority can have equal rights and the same dignity of heterosexual, cisgender persons and also a society where all sexual and gender minorities have hope and equal opportunities.

== Achievements of Blue Diamond Society ==
BDS worked with local governments and the Supreme Court to have the Election Commission of Nepal and local census forms offer a "third gender" option in addition to "male" and "female". A third gender person, Bishnu Adhikari, received full citizenship and identification papers as ruled by the Supreme Court Nepal in 2007. This has encouraged other third gender citizens to demand correct legal identification with their correct gender. Continuous lobbying, delegations, and sit-in programs from the local to national level have been carried out by the Blue Diamond Society. The Manisha Dhaka l was awarded the "Nai Rani Laxmi" award in 2010 for her contributions to LGBT rights and actively participated in the pleadings in the petition filed for equal rights in 2007.

Other achievements of Blue Diamond Society include:

- Creating Nepal's first LGBTI sporting event: Nepal's Gay Olympics.
- Built one of the largest LGBTQI network to test for HIV/AIDS.
- Produced public education and media initiatives such as the Pahichan radio program

== Controversies ==
In 2012, Blue Diamond Society was accused of corruption and nepotism, which led to serious financial trouble for the organization. BDS responded by saying that "called conspiracies to defame the society and weaken the campaign launched for the rights of third gender people and sexual minorities," whilst never really addressing the merits of the accusation. During the investigation, Pant immigrated to London. Blue Diamond Society has also been recorded by National News Channels for physically attacking people who reported the corruption. Blue Diamond Society had threatened those transgender individuals who do not identify as 'third gender' to remain silent and not speak about the issue.

== Criticisms ==
The Blue Diamond Society has been criticized for creating a rigid "third gender narrative" in Nepal. A gender fluid person was reportedly mocked by the Blue Diamond Society. It has been criticized for rejecting the belief that there are multiple genders, and having pejorative attitudes against genderqueer or gender fluid people. In 2019, a series of confessions posted online called out the organization's alleged transphobia. It was alleged that famous Nepalese actor Santosh Panta's transgender daughter was advised by a representative of the organisation to refer to herself as 'third gender', contrary to her self-identification.

== Awards ==
In 2007, Blue Diamond Society won the International Gay and Lesbian Human Rights Commission's (IGLHRC) Felipa de Souza Award.

== Pride Festival ==
Nepal's Pride festival is organised by Blue Diamond Society annually on the day of Gai Jatra. The first annual pride festival by BDS in Nepal was held in 2010 in Kathmandu, the 6th International LGBTI Pride festival took place in 2016 with the support of UNDP under Global Fund MSA program.

== See also ==
- LGBT rights in Nepal
- Intersex rights in Nepal
- List of LGBT rights organizations
- Intersex civil society organizations
- Intersex human rights
