= Saugat Malla =

Nepalese movie and threator actor

- सौगात मल्ल
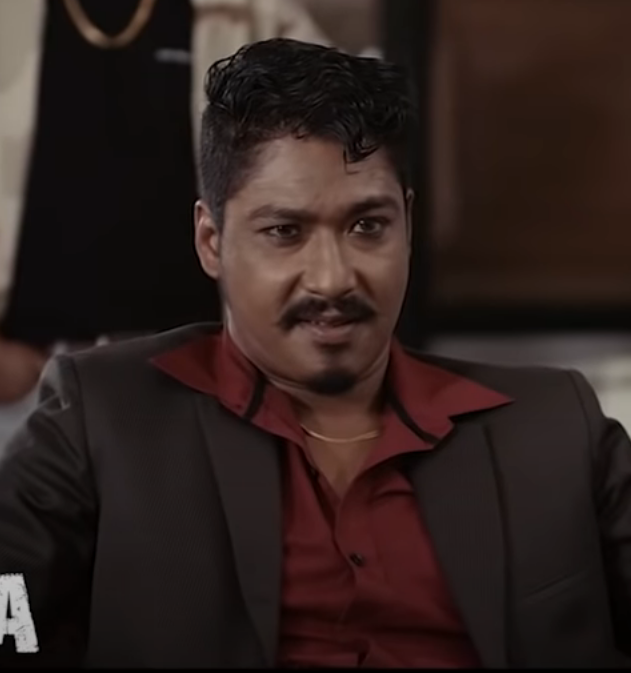
- Malla in 2015 film, Sadanga
- Born: August 10, 1978 (age 48); Nawalparasi, Nepal
- Occupations: Actor; film producer
- Years active: 1998–present
- Notable work: Loot, Kagbeni, Chhadke, Uma, Kabaddi Kabaddi, Sungava, Sadanga

Saugat Malla (Nepali: सौगात मल्ल) is a Nepalese film actor and producer. He is one of the best contemporary actor of Nepal. He began acting professionally in 2008 and became known for his leading role as Haku Kale in Loot (2012). Other work includes Kagbeni (2007), Mukhauta (2014), Sadanga (2015), Soongava: Dance of the Orchids (2012), Lappan Chhappan (2017), Kabaddi Kabaddi (2015), and Fateko Jutta (2017), Kabaddi 4: The Final Match (2022), Agastya: Chapter 1 (2024), and The Red Suitcase (2024).

== Career ==
=== Early career ===
Malla started acting at Aarohan Gurukul (Nepals first drama school), appearing in several critically acclaimed productions including Oedipus Rex and Agni Ko Katha at Gurukul Theater.

Malla made his film debut in Kagbeni (2008), directed by Bhusan Dahal and featuring Deeya Maskey, Nima Rumba and Hanif Mohammed; then in K Yo Maya Ho (2011). He had to wait four years before being signed in Nischal Basnet's Loot (2012). The film became one of the most successful films in Nepal, and he came to be identified as the bank robbing Haku Kale, the character he played in the film. Several other Nepalese films including Soongava: Dance of the Orchids (2012), Kathaa (2013), Sourya (2013), Badhshala (2013), Shree 5 Ambare (2014), Utsav (2014), Mukhauta (2014) and Sadanga (2015) soon followed.

=== Commercial success (2015–present) ===
In 2015 Malla starred in the romantic-comedy Kabaddi Kabaddi (2015), directed by Ram Babu Gurung which became one of the highest grossing Nepalese films of 2015, in the role of Bam Kaji who returns to his home village, falls in love with the female lead, but must compete for her affections with a rival. After the release of Kabaddi Kabaddi (2015) Malla was regarded as important in cinema of Nepal history. Then he appeared in Dying Candle (2016), directed by Naresh Kumar Kc, in which he starred alongside Srijana Subba, Arpan Thapa, and Lakpa Singi Tamang, which wasn't strong at the box office. Then he starred in Fanko (2016) with Dayahang Rai, Priyanka Karki, and Keki Adhikari, in the role of a bank worker who is kidnapped by thieves.

In 2017 he starred in crime film Loot 2, directed by Nischal Basnet. Although his performance was praised, the film was criticized as inferior to the original Loot. In Fateko Jutta, a romance directed by Nikesh Khadka, he acted alongside Priyanka Karki and Kameshwor Chaurasiya. The film did not do well at the box office, but the audience praised the chemistry between Malla and Priyanka Karki. More recently, Malla appears in romantic films including Jhyanakuti (2017) and Mero Paisa Khoi (2017). Jhyanakuti was successful at the box office but Mero Paisa Khoi flopped after competing with another highly successful film, Chhakka Panja 2.

In January 2018, Malla appeared in an episode of the reality show webseries Artists Support Programme—Fashion Artist Edition.

== Filmography ==
†	Denotes films that have not yet been released

1998	Ranabhumi		Minor role.	
Year	Film	Role	Notes	Ref(s)
2002	Panchhi		Minor role.	
2008	Kagbeni	Ramesh	First film as a lead actor.	
2010	Dasdhunga	Don	Cameo	
2011	K Yo Maya Ho	Shyam		
2012	Highway	Ronit		
2012	Loot	Haku Kale		
2012	Soongava: Dance of the Orchids	Milan		
2013	Chhadke	Researcher		
2013	Badhshala	Maoist Leader		
2013	Uma	Milan		
2014	Fitkiree	Jivan		
2014	Utsav	Utsav		
2014	Shree 5 Ambare			
2014	Mukhauta	Ravi		
2014	Fitkerri	Jeevan Jung Thapa		
2015	Kabaddi Kabaddi	Bam Kaji		
2015	Sadanga			
2016	Fanko			
2016	Dying Candle	Janak Lal		
2016	Lukamari	Budhan Chaudhary		
2017	Loot 2	Haku Kale		
2017	Mero Paisa Khoi			
2017	Jhyanakuti			
2017	Lappan Chhappan	Bankaa Don		
2017	Fateko Jutta			
2017	Sanrakshan			
2018	Jai Bhole	Bhole		
2018	Panche Baja			
2018	Lalpurja			
2019	Poi Paryo Kale	Gaurav		
2019	Macha Macha			
2020	Teen Jantu	Saila	Unreleased film	
2022	Lappan Chhappan 2	Paras Jung Rana		
2022	Mantra	Karma		
2022	Kabaddi 4: The Final Match	Bam Kaji		
2022	Ghanachakkar	Krishne		
2022	Michael Adhikari	Krishna Adhikari		
2022	The Secrets of Radha	Basudev	Also producer	
2022	Dui Nambari	Himal Thapa		
2023	Pashupati Prasad 2: Bhasme Don	Kali Prasad		
2024	Agastya: Chapter 1	Shaurya	Won – Cine Circle Awards for Best Actor	
2024	The Red Suitcase	Driver		
2025	Pitambar			
2025	Jaar			
2025	Jante Bakhro			
2025	Ceetamol			
2025	Balidan			
2025	Viral Gorkhey			
2026	Paralko Aago	Juthe Damai		
2026	Mitjyu	Driver		
Upcoming	Bob dai			
	Zooba			
	The Rise of Saamrajya			
	Kalli			
