= Badhshala =

2013 Nepali historical drama film

- Theatrical release poster
- Nepali: वधशाला
- Directed by: Manoj Pandit
- Written by: Manoj Pandit
- Based on: Nepalese Civil War
- Produced by: Mohaan Dotel
- Starring: Saugat Malla; Dayahang Rai; Khagendra Lamichhane; Anup Baral; Arpan Thapa
- Release date: 19 April 2013
- Country: Nepal
- Language: Nepali

Badhshala (English: Slaughter House) is a 2013 Nepali historical drama film written and directed by Manoj Pandit and produced by Mohaan Dotel under the banner of Smashing Apple. It features Saugat Malla, Dayahang Rai, Khagendra Lamichhane, Anup Baral, and Arpan Thapa. Badhshala concerns the torture done by the Nepali Army to the Maoists during the Nepalese Civil War. It was briefly banned in Nepal but was cleared for screening after filmmakers deleted the "problematic torture scenes".

== Synopsis ==
The film is based on the tortures carried out by the Nepali Army on Maoists during the Nepalese Civil War (1996–2006). It shows that innocents and Maoists detainees were forced to sign a paper saying that they were Maoists, and they were later killed by the army in a jungle. The army also asks them to reveal information about their leader; if they refuse, they are taken to a jungle where they will see detainees being brutally murdered, implying that they will be killed if they do not reveal the information.

== Cast ==
- Saugat Malla as Maoist Leader
- Dayahang Rai as Captain Rai
- Khagendra Lamichhane as Krishna
- Anup Baral as Major Sab
- Arpan Thapa as Captain Thapa

== Production ==
Badhshala was reportedly made on a budget of four million Nepalese rupees (about US$46,512 in 2013).

== Banning ==
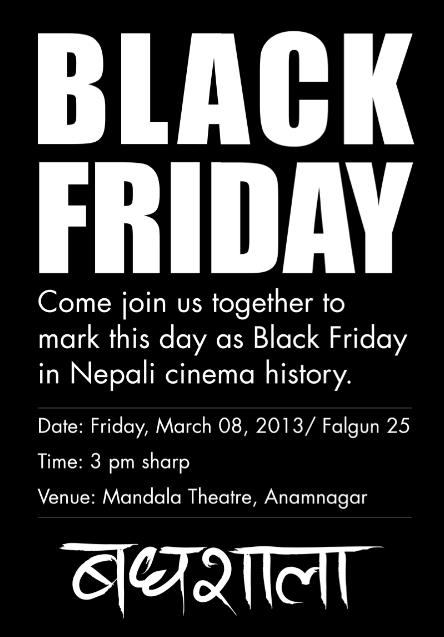
Poster for the protest

Initially, the Nepali Army objected to the film being screened because the actors are wearing military uniforms without permission. Later, the army said that the film could "derail the peace process". In March 2013, Al Jazeera reported that Badhshala had been banned. Director Manoj Pandit said that he would go to the Supreme Court of Nepal, regarding this as an attack on freedom of speech. According to the director, the film is fictional but based on historical facts. Pandit told the South China Morning Post that he had given a DVD of the film to Prime Minister Baburam Bhattarai to urge him to release the film. The film was cleared for screening in cinemas after the filmmakers deleted the "problematic torture scenes". Badhshala was screened on 19 April 2013. The film was later selected for 16th Siliguri international film festival in 2015.

It's embarrassing to live in a country that sends its troops all over the world on peacekeeping missions but can't respect the basic right to free speech at home [Nepal].

— Mohaan Dotel, Film Producer, TimesLIVE

== Critical reception ==
Trishna Rana writing for Nepali Times wrote that Badhshala is a "flawed historical drama" since it shows only one side of the civil war.
