= Hamro Team =

- Promotional poster
- Genre: Soap opera
- Created by: Bhusan Dahal
- Written by: Abinash Shah, Deepak Rauniyar, Abhimanyu Nirabi
- Directed by: Bhusan Dahal
- Starring: Reecha Sharma; Eelum Dixit; Niraj Kumar Chaudhary; Ghanashyam Kumar Mishra; Mohammed Abdul Khan; Sauram Raj Tuladhar; Dayahang Rai
- Opening theme: "Hamro Team" by Nima Rumba & Astha B.
- Country of origin: Nepal
- Original language: Nepali
- No. of series: 1
- No. of episodes: 13

Production
- Executive producers: John Marks, Deborah Jones
- Producers: Serena Rix Tripathee, Yubakar
- Cinematography: Bidur Pandey
- Editor: Lokesh Bajracharya
- Running time: 30 minutes

Original release
- Network: Kantipur Television
- Release: June 9 – September 1, 2011

Hamro Team is a Nepalese television soap opera, telecasted in the Nepal on Kantipur Television. Hamro Team story is of the Nepali version of The Team – Hamro Team, has been written by a group of Nepali writers working closely with Search for Common Ground Nepal and is being produced locally with AB Pictures Pvt. Ltd. Hamro Team, 13 episodes, is directed by Bhusan Dahal. It premiered on 9 June 2011 and ended on 1 September 2011, with a total of 13 episodes over the course of 1 series.

== Plot ==
Hamro Team follows a group of people from different backgrounds who come together to form a football team. They face many difficulties along the way, but once they learn to work as a team, they go on to win the national championship.

== Characters ==
- Seema – Seema is a star player in a girl's national football team. She also coaches students in a local high school. She is an excellent striker, an effective captain and a potential leader. Her father (also her coach in the girls' football team) and mother are happy that Seema has won a DV Lottery Visa to US and that she will be leaving football ("Girls have no future in sports in Nepal.") to pursue a more prosperous and safer future. But Seema has a different dream. Sanket, a businessman takes over a project in which he wants to produce a national football team with players from around the country and he persuades Seema to be the team coach for the all men football team.
- Sanket – Sanket, from a well-off Kathmandu family, has just returned after his studies in the US. He believes he can do something worthwhile in Nepal. Son of a bank manager, he has started working in the bank. He now wants to form a football team for the promotion of the bank. His dream is to form a unique Nepali team which can accommodate talented Nepali young players from all over the country irrespective of their castes, groups or backgrounds
- Resham – In the search of the players, they find interesting people along the way. Resham, a young man of Tharu community from Dang district, is involved with an armed group. The gang loot and rob, and Resham has been forcefully dragged into the activities of the gang. Resham wants to free himself out of the gang, and wants to pursue his passion in football. His dream is to be a good football player.
- Chandrakanta – Chandrakanta is from a Madhesi dalit family. His father runs the business of a wedding band. Ghanashyam does not have a year for music and plays poorly. Despite that, he has been forced to play in his father's band. His dream, however, is to be a professional footballer. He decides to quit his father's band to play football.
- Safiq – Safiq belongs to a Muslim family in Pokhara. He fell in love with a Hindu girl, married her against the will of families and society and ran away to Birgunj. Even though a good football player in Pokhara, he has not been able to establish his identity as a footballer in Birgunj, where he pulls a rickshaw to make ends meet. His ideal player is Cristiano Ronaldo.
- Ricky – Ricky, Sanket's cousin brother, is a good football player from a club in Kathmandu. However, he is not satisfied with playing in the club. He wants to do something new and big in football. He belongs to a well-to-do Kathmandu elite class, and is a snob.
- Toran – Toran was in Maoist army. After being listed as 'disqualified' by UNMIN (United Nations Mission in Nepal), he was discharged from one of the cantonments established after the Comprehensive Peace Accord between the ruling parties and the Maoists. He still has faith in the progressive approach and political line of thinking of his party for social change and nation's development. And, he has passion in football. Now his aim in life is to be a good football player.

== Cast ==
- Reecha Sharma as Seema
- Dhiren Raja (Limbu) as Sanket
- Niraj Kumar Chaudhary as Resham
- Ghanashyam Kumar Mishra as Chandrakanta
- Mohammed Abdul Khan as Safiq
- Sauram Raj Tuladhar as Ricky
- Daya Hang Rai as Toran

== Episodes ==
No.	Title	Directed by	Original release date
1	"Episode One"	Bhusan Dahal	9 June 2011
In the first episode, Sanket comes back home to Kathmandu after he finishes his studies in the US. He discusses to make a local football team with his dad. Seema applies for a student passport to go Australia to progress for her studies but later she withdraws her applications and doesn't stays in Nepal; where Sanket persuades Seema to be the coach for his football team.
2	"Episode Two"	Bhusan Dahal	16 June 2011
Seema accepts Sanket's offer and both of them go on a hunt for the players on their football. In the journey to Dang, a gang of the thieves steal Seema and Sanket's personal items in a dark forest. The next day, Sanket and Seema see a potential player for their team, Resham, who happens to be a part of the group of thugs who stole Sanket and Seema feels guilty and returns their personal items after he persuades to his gang leader for it and apologises to Seema for his behaviour, to which she accepts him but on the other hand Sanket has a different view about him being a gang member.
3	"Episode Three"	Bhusan Dahal	23 June 2011
After they find their first player for their team, both of them return to their homes in Kathmandu and Seema's parents show their feeling about her being a female coach on an all-boys football team. A few days later, she goes to Biratnagar where a strike takes place and she asks Safiq to drive her to her hotel. In between her journey, Safiq tells his passion for football and says Ronaldo as his favourite player because of the similarities both of them have which impresses Seema and tells Safiq if he shows any interest to be a part of her football team. Seema also finds Toran who was disqualified by UNMIN (United Nations Mission in Nepal) and is now struggling to get a job to look after his ill mother at home.
4	"Episode Four"	Bhusan Dahal	30 June 2011
Sanket gets a place for his team to practice and also tries to get a football ground for his team to train. After Seema's take on finding some players for her team; Resham, Safiq and few new faces unit on their bootcamp. Ricky who is the cousin of Sanket, coming from a privilege Kathmandu family comes to join the team after Sanket's dad requested him. Chandrakanta from Janakpur runs away from his home to escape for his job as a wedding band, he finds the bootcamp and becomes the last player to be in the team.
5	"Episode Five"	Bhusan Dahal	7 July 2011
Sanket finds it hard to get the football ground in which they were training on for a week and the council officer tells him to battle against a football team who owns the area. Seema gets frustrated from the behaviour of the players towards each other. Later that day, some of the team players go out for clubbing and break the rules Seema made; later on Sanket gets a call from the police station saying they were locked up for behaving badly to which Seema gets fed up with the team.
6	"Episode Six"	Bhusan Dahal	14 July 2011
After the team members get discharged from the police station. Seema punishes them by not feeding them dinner that night. The next day, Seema takes her team in a jogging and gives them a hardcore training to prepare them from their match. After that day, the team play on a football match in which they lose and the team loses the football ground from the other team.
7	"Episode Seven"	Bhusan Dahal	21 July 2011
8	"Episode Eight"	Bhusan Dahal	28 July 2011
9	"Episode Nine"	Bhusan Dahal	4 August 2011
10	"Episode Ten"	Bhusan Dahal	11 August 2011
11	"Episode Eleven"	Bhusan Dahal	18 August 2011
12	"Episode Twelve"	Bhusan Dahal	25 August 2011
13	"Episode Thirteen"	Bhusan Dahal	1 September 2011

== Production ==
Hamro Team is a part of a multi-country television episodic drama being... produced by Search for Common Ground and Common Ground Productions with local partners in each of these countries. International project, The Team, is being implemented in Kenya, Ivory Coast, Morocco, Ethiopia, Democratic Republic of Congo, Liberia, Nepal, Palestine, Sierra Leone, Angola, Burundi, Guinea, Indonesia, Pakistan and Zimbabwe. The Team in Ethiopia, Burundi and Guinea are radio programs whereas rest of the countries produce it as television series.

The Team in all these countries has common themes of good governance, teamwork, leadership and cooperation across dividing lines. The story is built on the backdrop of football (with exception of Pakistan, where it is cricket) because of the universal appeal of the game, but is written by local writers and is different from country to country.

The story of the Nepali version of The Team – Hamro Team, has been written by a group of Nepali writers working closely with Search for Common Ground Nepal and is being produced locally with AB Pictures Pvt. Ltd. Hamro Team, 13 episodes, is directed by Bhusan Dahal.
