= Daryn Tufts =

American actor (born 1973)

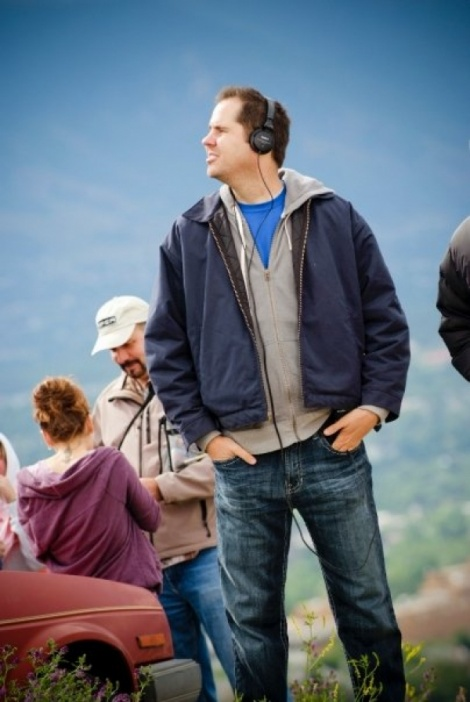
- Daryn Tufts during filming of My Girlfriend's Boyfriend.
- Born: April 1, 1973 (age 53); Arcadia, California, United States
- Occupations: Writer, Producer, Director, Actor
- Website: www.daryntufts.com

Daryn Tufts (born April 1, 1973 in Arcadia, California) is a writer, director, producer, and actor. Tufts’s writing, producing, and directing credits include feature films, documentaries, and television commercials and he has acted in several successful independent films. Tufts has also performed and taught sketch comedy and improvisational comedy with several professional comedy troupes and is the commercial spokesperson for the Questar Corporation (gas company). He currently lives in Holladay, Utah.

== Education ==
After graduating from Canyon High School (Santa Clarita, California), Tufts received a degree in journalism from Ricks College in Rexburg, Idaho and a degree in marketing communications from Brigham Young University in Provo, Utah.

== Career ==
=== Live comedy ===
While attending BYU, Tufts joined The Garrens Comedy Troupe, a popular sketch and improvisational troupe that performed live shows to often sold-out audiences nearly every weekend. It was on The Garrens that Tufts got his first professional experience writing and performing for paying audiences and was involved with the troupe for over two years. After graduation, Tufts was asked to help launch the Utah chapter of ComedySportz, a national improvisational comedy franchise. Tufts became the first improvisational teacher for the new Utah cast and principal cast member for live shows. Tufts performed with ComedySportz for over two years.

In 2010, Tufts returned to ComedySportz and currently performs periodically. In September 2013, Daryn produced and performed in The Garrens Comedy Troupe 20th Anniversary Reunion Spectacular! at Brigham Young University.

=== Writing ===
After graduating from BYU, Tufts began his career as a professional writer, writing commercials and other forms or marketing, advertising, and promotions for advertising agencies and production companies. Soon after, he began to experiment with longer forms of writing, including screenplays and novels.

=== LDS Cinema ===
Tufts’ film career began in 2002 with the release of The Singles Ward, regarded as the first LDS comedy feature film. Tufts played the role of Eldon, the Franklin Day Planner enthusiast and acted as script doctor, writing and editing several scenes in the film’s script. The Singles Ward was a box office success that launched the genre of LDS comedies as well as Tufts’ acting career.

After The Singles Ward, Tufts went on to appear in the films The R.M., The Home Teachers, Church Ball, and The Singles 2nd Ward, the sequel to the 2002 film.

=== American Mormon ===
In 2004, Tufts began working on American Mormon, his first documentary. Partnering with local actor and businessman Jed Knudsen, Tufts began traveling across the United States, shooting the documentary. American Mormon was shot in Washington, D.C., New York City, New Orleans, Memphis, Las Vegas Los Angeles and other locations. Tufts, on camera, approached random people. Upon their consent, Tufts interviewed these people, “man on the street” style with one objective: find out what people across the United States know about Mormons. After several weeks of traveling and shooting, Tufts and Knudsen began to compile the footage which would become a comedic cross-section of people from all over the country.

Released by Excel Entertainment Group in 2005, American Mormon took a unique look at the LDS religion and culture from an outside point of view. The documentary was highly successful and led Excel to partner with Tufts and Knudsen to produce a sequel - American Mormon in Europe. For it, the two men traveled across Western Europe, including Italy, France, Germany and the United Kingdom. Along with discovering what people from different parts of the world knew about Mormons, Tufts and Knudsen decided to add a new element to this documentary. All over Europe, the two men also talked, on camera, with members of the LDS faith to document the experiences of people who are members of the LDS church outside of the United States. This included an in-depth discussion with LDS members who lived in West and East Berlin when the Berlin Wall came down and a visit to the Gadfield Elm Chapel, the oldest LDS chapel on earth, in Herefordshire, England.

American Mormon in Europe was released by Excel Entertainment Group in 2006.

=== Stalking Santa ===
In 2006, Tufts released Stalking Santa, his first national feature film that was not associated with any LDS characters, references, or themes. The film is a comedy centered around a man’s obsession to scientifically prove the existence of Santa Claus. Daryn was the screenwriter and co-producer of the project and acted in one of the lead roles.

Stalking Santa was Executive Produced by William Shatner, who also acted as narrator of the film. Greg Kiefer, the other Executive Producer, directed the film through Cosmic Pictures in Salt Lake City, Utah.

=== Directing ===
In 2009, Tufts directed his first feature film, My Girlfriend's Boyfriend, which he also wrote. Produced by Rick McFarland (FiftyFilms) and Alyssa Milano (Peace by Peace Productions), My Girlfriend's Boyfriend stars Alyssa Milano, Christopher Gorham, Michael Landes, Beau Bridges, Carol Kane, and Tom Lenk.

In 2011, Tufts directed his second feature film, Inside, which he also wrote. The movie stars Luke Goss, Paul Rae, Isaac C. Singleton, Jr., and Derek Phillips (actor).

=== My Girlfriend's Boyfriend ===
In My Girlfriend's Boyfriend', Alyssa Milano plays Jesse Young, a woman who must choose between two very different, yet seemingly ideal men: sexy but struggling writer Ethan (Christopher Gorham) and button-down advertising exec Troy (Michael Landes). My Girlfriend's Boyfriend is a film that asks the question: what happens when a girl meets Mr. Right, after already meeting the right guy?

My Girlfriend's Boyfriend had its world premiere April 24, 2010 to a sold out audience at the Newport Beach Film Festival in Newport Beach, California.

On October 22, 2010, the movie began a limited theatrical run in Salt Lake City, Utah, and scored $10,300 on its opening weekend on just two screens. That per-screen average, of $5,150, was higher than that of many of the weekend's top 10 films, resulting in the film's expansion to three other theaters.

My Girlfriend's Boyfriend also received positive critical reviews from several local critics, including The Salt Lake Tribune and the Deseret News, Salt Lake City's two major newspapers.

In December, 2010, My Girlfriend's Boyfriend experienced a national release through WB Digital's pay-per-view and VOD platforms. The movie is also currently available in High Definition through NetFlix Streaming Video On-Demand, Hulu, and iTunes.

On March 1, 2011, My Girlfriend's Boyfriend was released on DVD.

Outside of the United States, the film was released in Germany, Benelux, Spain, Portugal, Italy, Australia, New Zealand, the Mideast, the U.K., Latin America, Central and Eastern Europe, Indonesia, and other areas.

A novelization of the film, written by Elodia Strain, was published by Cedar Fort, Inc. on August 8, 2011.

=== Inside ===
In June, 2011, Daryn Tufts directed Inside, a horror feature film that he also wrote. The movie stars Luke Goss, Paul Rae, Derek Phillips (actor), and Isaac Singleton. The film premiered at the first Salt Lake City Comic Con in 2013, where it won Best Feature Film, Best Editing, Best Actor (Isaac Singleton, Jr.), and Best Director.

=== K9 Adventures: Legend of The Lost Gold ===
In 2013, Tufts wrote K9 Adventures: Legend of The Lost Gold, a family adventure movie, directed by Stephen Shimek and starring Luke Perry, Brooke Langton, and Ariana Bagley.

=== The Questar Gas Energy WiseGuy ===
Currently (and since 2007), Tufts can be seen across the state of Utah as Therm: The Questar Gas Energy Wiseguy (official Questar Gas Spokesperson)

== Filmography ==
=== Actor ===
- My Girlfriend's Boyfriend (2010)
- The Singles 2nd Ward - Eldon (2007)
- Stalking Santa - Clarence Onstott (2006)
- American Mormon in Europe - Himself (2006)
- Church Ball - Misfit Polynesian Basketball Player (2006)
- American Mormon - Himself (2005)
- The Home Teachers - Joel (2004)
- The R.M. - Basketball Player (2003)
- The Singles Ward - Eldon (2002)

=== Writer ===
- Extinct (3 episodes) (2017)
- We Love You, Sally Carmichael! (2017)
- Random Acts (2 episodes) (2016)
- Painting the Town (6 episodes) (2015)
- Thirst (2015)
- K9 Adventures: Legend of The Lost Gold (2013)
- Chronologic (2013)
- Inside (2012)
- My Girlfriend's Boyfriend (2010)
- Stalking Santa (2006)
- American Mormon in Europe (2006)
- American Mormon (2005)

=== Producer ===
- Stalking Santa (2006)
- American Mormon in Europe (2006)
- American Mormon (2005)
- Geekshow Podcast (2015) (Uncredited)

=== Director ===
- Inside (2012)
- My Girlfriend's Boyfriend (2010)
- American Mormon in Europe (2006)
