= List of Nepalese submissions for the Academy Award for Best International Feature Film =

Nepalese films

Best International Feature Film submissions from Nepal

Highlights
- Debut: 1999
- Submissions: 16
- Nominations: 1
- Oscar winners: none

Nepal is among over one hundred countries that have submitted films for consideration for the Academy Award for Best International Feature Film. (Note: The category was previously named the Academy Award for Best Foreign Language Film, but this was changed to the Academy Award for Best International Feature Film in April 2019, after the Academy deemed the word "Foreign" to be outdated.) Nepal made its first submission in 1999. The Foreign Language Film award is handed out annually by the United States Academy of Motion Picture Arts and Sciences to a feature-length motion picture produced outside the United States that contains primarily non-English dialogue.

As of 2026, Nepal was nominated only once, for Himalaya/Caravan (1999).

== Submissions ==
The Academy of Motion Picture Arts and Sciences has invited the film industries of various countries to submit their best film for the Academy Award for Best International Feature Film since 1956. The International Feature Film Committee oversees the process and reviews all the submitted films. Following this, they vote via secret ballot to determine the five nominees for the award.

Below is a list of the films that have been submitted by Nepal for review by the academy for the award by year and the respective Academy Awards ceremony.

Year (Ceremony)	Film title used in nomination	Original title	Director	Result
1999 (72nd)	Himalaya/Caravan	हिमालय	Eric Valli	Nominated
2000 (73rd)	Mask of Desire	मुकुण्डो	Tsering Rhitar Sherpa	Not nominated
2003 (76th)	Muna Madan	मुनामदन	Gyanendra Bahadur Deuja	Not nominated
2006 (79th)	Basain	बसाई	Subash Gajurel	Not nominated
2013 (86th)	Soongava: Dance of the Orchids	सुनगाभा	Subarna Thapa	Not nominated
2014 (87th)	Jhola	झोला	Yadavkumar Bhattarai	Not nominated
2015 (88th)	Talakjung vs Tulke	टलकजंग भर्सेस टुल्के	Nischal Basnet	Not nominated
2016 (89th)	The Black Hen	कालो पोथी	Min Bahadur Bham	Not nominated
2017 (90th)	White Sun	सेतो सुर्य	Deepak Rauniyar	Not nominated
2018 (91st)	Panchayat	पंचायत	Shivam Adhikari	Not nominated
2019 (92nd)	Bulbul	बुलबुल	Binod Poudel	Not nominated
2022 (95th)	Butterfly on the Windowpane	ऐना झ्यालको पुतली	Sujit Bidari	Not nominated
2023 (96th)	Halkara	हल्कारा	Bikram Sapkota	Not nominated
2024 (97th)	Shambhala	शम्भाला	Min Bahadur Bham	Not nominated
2025 (98th)	Anjila		Milan Chams	Not nominated
2026 (99th)	Elephants in the Fog	तिनीहरू	Abinash Bikram Shah	Pending

== See also ==
- List of Academy Award winners and nominees for Best International Feature Film
- List of Academy Award-winning foreign language films
