= Singha Durbar (TV series) =

- TV program Poster
- Genre: Drama
- Created by: Tsering Rhitar Sherpa
- Written by: Abinash Bikram Shah
- Directed by: Tsering Rhitar Sherpa
- Starring: Gauri Malla; Pramod Agrahari; Bhintuna Joshi; Ramesh Ranjan; Alok Thapa; Praween Khatiwada; Mithila Sharma
- Country of origin: Nepal
- Original language: Nepali
- No. of episodes: 13

Production
- Producer: Yubakar Raj Rajkarnikar
- Cinematography: Sushant Prajapati
- Running time: 30 minutes

Original release
- Network: Nepal Television
- Release: November 15, 2015 – February 7, 2016

Singha Durbar (Nepali: सिंहदरवार) is a 2015 Nepalese television series. It revolves around the story of Nepal's first female prime minister, who undergoes various challenges in her quest to establish a system of governance with transparency, accountability, and collaborative leadership

Singha Durbar is Nepal's first futuristic political drama. It was directed by Tsering Rhitar Sherpa, known for Mukundo: Mask of Desire and Karma, and produced by Yubakar Raj Rajkarnikar.

The television series is a joint production of Search for Common Ground Nepal (SFCG) and Mila Productions. Supported by USAID Nepal, the television series aspires to promote positive role models in governance, and a culture of collaboration between the government and the general public.

== Cast ==
No.	Name	Role
1	Gauri Malla	Asha Singh
2	Pramesh Jha	Dr. Ramesh Singh
3	Anil Pandey	Chief Secretary (Tikaram Upadhaya)
4	Bhintuna Joshi	Sumnima Bajracharya
5	Praween Khatiwada	Bishwa Bishwokarma
6	Ramesh Ranjan	Ramananda Jha
7	Pramod Agrahari	Yubaraj Jha
8	Ramesh Budathoki	Mr. Malla
9	Deshbhakta Khanal	Mr. Thapa
10	Mithila Sharma	Nandini Thapa
11	Prakash Ghimire	Nanda Wagle
12	Bikram Singh	Niranjan
13	B.S. Rana	Pushkar Basnet
14	Sanjay Nepal	Aditya Singh
15	Dhirendra Jha	Ishwor SIngh
16	Rupa Jha	Janaki Jha
17	Sylvina Bajracharya	Sahana Jha
18	Nagina Joshi	Sumnima's Mother
19	Akal Maan	Sumnima's Father
20	Rati Basnet	Nanda Wagle's Wife
21	Basanta Bhatta	Kamal KC
22	Poonam Rana	Durga
23	Naradmuni Hartamchhali	Navin's Thapa

== Plot ==
The television drama Singha Durbar revolves around the story of Nepal's first female prime minister, who undergoes various challenges in her quest to establish a governance system of transparency, accountability and collaborative leadership. Gauri Malla, is the protagonist of Singha Durbar. Her portrayal of Nepal's first female prime minister enshrines the possibility of women's leadership in the near future, and also encourages an ideal world where female leadership is respected and acknowledged.

== Episodes ==
Episode	Release date	Subject matter	Notes	Ref
01 (First Episode)	15 November 2015	Democracy, leadership and gender equality.		
02		Collaborative leadership, resolving personal conflicts and inclusion.		
03		Agriculture, cooperation and solution-orientated problem solving.		
04		Safer migration, labour trafficking and rule of law.		
05		Agriculture and food security, corruption and impunity		
06		Health and improving scrutiny of medicines	The data as delivered at time code 3:47 in Episode 6 – ‘For every 1,000 babies born here 190 mothers still die’ – should have been ‘For every 100,000 babies born here 190 mothers still die	
07		Local Governance and violence free elections.		
08		Disaster Risk Reduction (DRR) and collaborative leadership		
09		Access to justice		
10		Climate change and multi-party democracy		
11		Budget, role of tax, conflict resolution and public engagement.		
12		Truth and Reconciliation (transformation for peace) / SportsTransformation		
13 (Ending episode)		Truth and Reconciliation (transformation for peace) / Sports		
