= Mukhauta =

Nepali film

- Official poster of Nepali Movie Mukhauta
- Nepali: मुखौटा
- Directed by: Arpan Thapa
- Screenplay by: Arpan Thapa
- Story by: Arpan Thapa, Pratik Gurung
- Produced by: Rabin Shrestha
- Starring: Sunil Thapa; Rajesh Hamal; Saugat Malla; Nisha Adhikari; Arpan Thapa; Dayahang Rai; Robin Tamang; Sunil Thapa
- Narrated by: Madan Krishna Shrestha
- Music by: Kalyan Singh; Kali Prasad Baskota; Sunny Sunam
- Release date: 13 June 2014
- Running time: 142 minutes
- Country: Nepal
- Language: Nepali
- Budget: 90 lakhs
- Box office: 70 lakhs

Mukhauta is a Nepali movie which features gangster life in thamel how the two gangs use their power against other people.

== Cast ==
- Sunil Thapa as Mr D
- Rajesh Hamal as Manish
- Robin Tamang as Chepang
- Arpan Thapa as Pundit
- Saugat Malla as Ravi
- Nisha Adhikari as Pandit's Girlfriend
- Harshika Shrestha as Ravi's Girlfriend
- Dayahang Rai as Police Officer
- Prasant Tamrakar
- Pradeep Dhakal
- Saroj Bhakrel

== Songs ==
No.	Title	Singer(s)	Length
1.	"Mukhauta OST"	Rabin Shrestha, Yama Buddha, The Sign Band	3:12
2.	"K Raja K Raiti"	Kali Prasad Baskota	3:17
3.	"Chahera Pani"	Pratima Sunam	2:16
4.	"Behal Huncha Maan"	Indira Joshi	5:06
