= Uma (2013 film) =

- Directed by: Tsering Rhitar Sherpa
- Story by: Tsering Rhitar Sherpa
- Produced by: Tsering Rhitar Sherpa
- Starring: Reecha Sharma; Saugat Malla; Mithila Sharma; Dayahang Rai; Nischal Basnet
- Cinematography: Purshottam Pradhan
- Edited by: Sabina Basnet; Tsering Rhitar Sherpa
- Production company: Mila Productions Pvt. Ltd.
- Release date: May 23, 2013 (Nepal)
- Country: Nepal
- Language: Nepali

Uma is a 2013 Nepali drama film directed by Tsering Rhitar Sherpa. It stars Reecha Sharma, Saugat Malla, Mithila Sharma in the lead roles, alongside Dayahang Rai and Nischal Basnet. The film is about the Nepalese Civil War.

== Synopsis ==
Milan (Saugat Malla) is a police officer in the early 2000s, during the Nepalese Civil War, while Uma (Reecha Sharma), his sister, eventually joins the Maoist movement. When Milan learns about her involvement with the Maoist, the story takes a turning point.

== Cast ==
- Reecha Sharma as Uma
- Saugat Malla as Milan
- Mithila Sharma as Mother
- Dayahang Rai as Comrade Sonam
- Nischal Basnet as Bhuwan Hamal
- Pramod Agrahari as Vineet
- Praween Khatiwada as Anil Kayastha

== Reception ==
Shreya Paudel of The Kathmandu Post praised the director writing "[he] shot the movie beautifully with stunning camera work and angles". Saugat Malla was nominated for Best Actor in a Leading Role (Male) by the NFDC National Film Award.
