= Giraftaar (film) =

- Directed by: Rajendra Upreti
- Screenplay by: Maunata Srestha
- Story by: Sandesh Man Srestha
- Produced by: Bhadrakumari Sen Thakuri
- Starring: Rajesh Hamal; Mausami Malla; Biraj Bhatta; Richa Ghimire
- Cinematography: Kumar Bakhati
- Edited by: Badri Lamichhane
- Music by: Suresh Adhikari
- Distributed by: S.M.S Films P.L
- Release date: 2007
- Running time: 145 minutes
- Country: Nepal
- Language: Nepali

Birja Bhatt takes a mission to stop all the criminals who are killing Indian rhinoceros than he teams up with other people to complete this mission.

== Cast ==
- Rajesh Hamal
- Mausami Malla
- Biraj Bhatta
- Richa Ghimire
- Rajesh Dhungana
- Ramchandra Adhikari
- Dipendra Acharya
- Naresh Regmi
- Pushkar Bhatta
- Gopi Darling
- Lakshmi
- Madhavi
- Sushma Basnet
