= Sonu =

Sonu is a given name. People with this name include:

- Sonu Shamdasani (born 1962), British male writer
- Sonu Walia (born 1964), Indian Bollywood actress
- Sonu Shivdasani (born 1965), British male hotelier
- Sonu Nigam (born 1973), Indian male playback singer
- Sonu Kakkar (born 1979), Indian female playback singer
- Sonu Sood (born 1973), Indian actor
- Sonu (actress) (Sonu Gowda, born 1990), Indian Kannada film actress
- Sonu Beniwal (born 1993), Indian male footballer
- Sonu Singh (born 1995), Indian male cricketer
- Sonu Chandrapal, Indian actress
- Sonu Narwal, Indian male kabaddi player
