= Soongava: Dance of the Orchids =

2012 film

- Film poster
- Directed by: Subarna Thapa
- Written by: Subarna Thapa
- Starring: Saugat Malla; Deeya Maskey
- Cinematography: Sara Cornu
- Release date: 4 January 2012
- Running time: 85 minutes
- Country: Nepal
- Language: Nepali

Soongava: Dance of the Orchids (Nepali: सुनगाभा, translit. Soongava) is a 2012 Nepalese drama film written and directed by Subarna Thapa. It is Nepal's first lesbian film. The film was selected as the Nepalese entry for the Best Foreign Language Film at the 86th Academy Awards, but it was not nominated.

== Cast ==
- Saugat Malla as Milan
- Deeya Maskey as Diya
- Nisha Adhikari as Kiran

== Reception ==
Boyd van Hoeij writing for Variety, said the acting and technical aspects are passable, Hoeij further added "Unfortunately, the well-intentioned pic’s highly melodramatic (if tonally very serious) plotting and focus on a conservative, family-oriented society won’t do much to convince local queer youths that it does get better". Clarence Tsui of The Hollywood Reporter wrote, "It's true that Soongava is not exactly an epic tragedy in terms of story and look".

== See also ==
- List of submissions to the 86th Academy Awards for Best Foreign Language Film
- List of Nepalese submissions for the Academy Award for Best Foreign Language Film
