= Deeya Maskey =

Nepalese actress

- Born: 10 March 1991 (age 35); Kathmandu, Nepal
- Other name: Diya Maskey
- Years active: 2008–present
- Height: 1.66 m (5 ft 5 in)
- Spouse: Anup Baral (m. 2014)

Deeya Maskey or Diya Maskey (Nepali: दिया मास्के) is a Nepalese movie actress, dancer, theater artist and a theatre director. She was also well known as popular judge/gang leader on TV reality show Himalaya Roadies. She debuted on Nepalese film Kagbeni which was directed by one of the most influential director of Nepali film industry Bhusan Dahal. She was awarded with the national award by NIFF as "Best actress of 2022" for her role in movie Prakash. She has also worked in theatrical plays and dramas marked her debut as a theater director from the play "Katha Kasturi" in 2022.

== Personal life ==
Maskey married popular Nepalese actor, theater artist, theater director and movie director Anup Baral in 2014. She also runs her own acting school "Actors Studio Nepal".

== Filmography ==
Year	Title	Role	Note
2008	Kagbeni	Tara	Debut Film
2011	Ek Din Ek Raat		N/A
2012	Soongava	Diya	Nepal nominated this movie to send in the Academy Award (Oscar)
2013	Saanghuro	Kamala	International Awards Winning Movie
2014	Tata Bye Bye		Featured in "SAN FRANCISCO GLOBAL MOVIE FEST"
2014	Fitkiri		N/A
2015	Hostel Returns	Teacher	Special Appearance
2018 (announced)	Cosmic love		TBA
2022	Dokh		Critically acclaimed but flopped
2022	Prakash	Sita	Critically acclaimed and blockbuster
2024	12 Gaun		Blockbuster
2024	Karsang	TBA	TBA

=== Short films ===
Name	Role	Note
Kokh:A womb	Lead	(released for awareness purpose)
Cyber Cry	Lead	
Hundred Rupees	Lead	International Award winning

=== TV Shows ===
Year	Show	Role
1995	Dalan Drama	Television as well as acting debut
2017–2024	Himalaya Roadies	Judge/ Gang leader

=== Music Videos ===
She has also appeared in numerous nepali music videos making her one of the most critically acclaimed Nepali dancer and actress in Nepal. Her first ever modeling in a music video was in one of the most successful Nepali song of 90's 'Bhijyo Sirani'. Her latest performance in a music video is in "Fatyo ni maiti ko chino" song by Astha Raut. Most probably Deeya Maskey who has her qualification in dancing field has appeared in more than 70+ dancing videos, music videos, and play dances.

== Awards and nominations ==
Award	Year	Work	Category	Result	Ref(s)
National Film Awards	2021-2022	Prakash	Best Actor (Female)	Won	
