= My Girlfriend's Boyfriend (2010 film) =

2010 American film by Daryn Tufts

- Theatrical Poster
- Directed by: Daryn Tufts
- Written by: Daryn Tufts
- Produced by: Rick McFarland; Alyssa Milano
- Starring: Alyssa Milano; Beau Bridges; Michael Landes; Christopher Gorham; Carol Kane; Tom Lenk; Heather Stephens; Kelly Packard
- Cinematography: Brandon Christensen
- Edited by: Rick McFarland; Jenirae Reynolds; Ethan Vincent
- Music by: Sam Cardon
- Production companies: Opus Distribution; Fifty Films; Peace by Peace Productions
- Distributed by: Gaiam
- Release dates: April 24, 2010 (Newport Beach); May 1, 2010 (United States); November 10, 2012 (Belgium)
- Running time: 84 minutes
- Country: United States
- Language: English
- Budget: $1.4 million

My Girlfriend's Boyfriend is a 2010 American romantic comedy film written and directed by Daryn Tufts, and stars Alyssa Milano, Christopher Gorham, Michael Landes, Beau Bridges, Tom Lenk and Carol Kane.

== Plot ==
Ethan (Christopher Gorham) is a struggling writer who rushes to his girlfriend's house only to be told by her roommate that she has left for the airport. There and moments later, they are reunited and embrace. It is revealed to be an excerpt from Ethan's latest written work. His agent (Carol Kane), upon finishing the novel, informs him that it is “unrealistic” and will not be published.

Disappointed and exhausted from his many attempts at being published, Ethan retreats to a local café and while recording his thoughts into his personal journal meets waitress Jesse (Alyssa Milano) and is instantly smitten with her outgoing personality, beauty and charm. He asks for her phone number so they can go on a date together and she cheerfully agrees. Moments after Ethan leaves, a handsome patron named Troy (Michael Landes) enters the café and also asks Jesse on a date to which she also agrees.

As Ethan and Jesse begin to date, he learns that she was once married and that her marriage failed because she “was not the right girl” for her ex-husband. Ethan begins writing a new novel at the time that he and Jesse begin dating. Ethan, who manages the apartment building he lives in in order to live rent free, seems to be the exact opposite of the much more financially successful and suave Troy, an advertising executive. Despite this, Ethan and Jesse's relationship blossoms and deepens and he falls in love with her, as does Troy.

It is apparent through conversations with her brother (Tom Lenk) and uncle (Beau Bridges) that Jesse is struggling over how to tell Ethan her “secret”. She knows that Ethan desires a family and is enthralled by his interaction with his sister's children. After Ethan proposes marriage to her Jesse becomes emotionally distraught over the fear of revealing the truth and decides to end their relationship and leave town with Troy, who had asked her to move to another city with him to expand his business.

Heartbroken but determined to fulfill his promise to Jesse to finish his novel, Ethan submits his work and is overjoyed when he receives word from his agent that his novel will be published. As he is on the phone with his agent he receives a missed call from Jesse who is checking in at the airport. He tries to return her call but she has turned off her cell phone in the meantime. Just as in the beginning of the film, Ethan rushes to her apartment to tell her how much he loves her but her brother informs him that she has left for the airport. Ethan then races off to the airport only to find that he has missed Jesse's flight.

He returns home and is surprised to find Jesse waiting for him in his apartment. She tearfully expresses her wish to be honest with him, but he decides to share his news with her first. He shows her his new novel, Troy Meets Girl. It is revealed at this point that the relationship between Jesse and Troy was fictional; Troy had been created by Ethan as a more wealthy and successful version of himself for his novel to create content. Jesse was not leaving with another man, but rather for a job in another city for a fresh start. Jesse then reveals her secret to Ethan—she cannot have children. Ethan quickly responds that this does not matter to him and that they can adopt if need be. He again proposes marriage and this time Jesse accepts.

Jesse and Ethan get married and drive off in his car, which stalls and needs to be pushed by the wedding party.

== Cast ==
- Alyssa Milano as Jesse Young
- Christopher Gorham as Ethan Reed
- Michael Landes as Troy Parker
- Tom Lenk as David Young, Jesse's brother
- Beau Bridges as Logan Young: Jesse's uncle
- Carol Kane as Barbara
- Heather Stephens as Sarah, Ethan's sister
- Kelly Packard as Suzy

== Production ==
Principal photography began in June 2009, in Salt Lake City, Utah, under the state's rebate program and wrapped in July. Rick McFarland of Fiftyfilms produced the film with Milano being cast in the lead role.

== Release ==
On October 22, 2010, the film began a limited theatrical run in Salt Lake City, Utah, and scored $10,300 on its opening weekend on just two screens. That per-screen average, of $5,150, was higher than that of many of the weekend's top 10 films, resulting in the film's expansion to three other theaters.

The film also received positive critical reviews from several local critics, including The Salt Lake Tribune and the Deseret News, Salt Lake City's two major newspapers.

Outside of the United States, the film was released in Germany, Benelux, Spain, Portugal, Italy, Australia, New Zealand, the Mideast, the U.K., Latin America, Central and Eastern Europe, Indonesia and other areas.

== Reception ==
On Rotten Tomatoes the film has four reviews, all of which were positive. Margaret Anderson of the Deseret News gave it 3 out of 4 and praised the characters and the script. Tracy Moore of Common Sense Media gave it 3 out of 5 and called it a "Squeaky-clean romcom offers positive messages about love."
