= Highway to Dhampus =

Highway To Dhampus
- Film poster
- Directed by: Rick McFarland
- Produced by: John de Blas Williams
- Starring: Rachel Hurd-Wood; Gunner Wright; Suesha Rana; Raj Ballav Koirala; Deshbhakta Khanal; Sayush Gurung Bajracharya; Sophie McShera; Vinzenz Kiefer; Masha Tokareva; Sunil Shrestha
- Cinematography: Rick McFarland
- Music by: Sam Cardon
- Production companies: fiftyfilms De Lane Lea; ADR recording
- Release date: September 11, 2014
- Countries: United States; Nepal
- Languages: English; Nepali

Highway To Dhampus is a romantic drama film produced by John de Blas Williams and written, cinematography, and directed by Rick McFarland. Actors include Gunner Wright, who had previously worked on the movie "Love" and as the voice of Isaac Clarke in the Dead Space franchise, and Nepalese movie star Raj Ballav Koirala.

== Plot ==
When Laxmi, headmistress of a small orphanage in Nepal, is visited by a rich socialite attempting to fix her image through charitable acts, a chain of events is set in motion that affects everyone involved. Ajit, the western-savvy bush pilot, Colt, the American photojournalist and chaperone, and even Elizabeth, the spoiled British heiress, all discover their own reasons to ultimately change for the better.

== Cast ==
- Rachel Hurd-Wood as Elizabeth James
- Gunner Wright as Colt Morgan
- Suesha Rana as Laxmi
- Raj Ballav Koirala as Ajit Thapa
- Deshbhakta Khanal as Mahendra Sharma
- Sayush Gurung Bajracharya as Prabhujee
- Sophie McShera as Ginny Topham
- Vinzenz Kiefer as Nino Neumann
- Masha Tokareva as Sabina Kretchman
- Sunil Shrestha as Arjun

== Production ==
The film is said to be based on McFarland's philanthropic experience in Nepal.

== Reception ==
The Daily Universe found the find was about "Change, forgiveness, love and grief in scenic and culturally rich Nepal".

A mixed review in the Salt Lake City Weekly ends on the following assessment: "While the absence of cliché is a good start, the presence of a stronger arc would make for a better ending." The film received another mixed review, stating the opposite, i.e. that it starts too slowly but gets better in the part set in Nepal, and that, despite a few clichés, some of the actors's performances were heartwarming.
