= Apabad =

- Promotional poster of the film
- Directed by: Subash Koirala
- Screenplay by: Subash Koirala, Shivashish Jaishy
- Produced by: Sushan Prajapati, Suraj Koirala, Upendra Lamichhane, Bikash Duwal (Executive Producer)
- Starring: Raj Ballav Koirala; Nisha Adhikari; Rabi Giri; Bijaya Giri
- Cinematography: Sushan Prajapati
- Edited by: Raju Dhungana
- Music by: Ujjwal Meghi Gurung
- Production companies: Ideas and Images Pvt. Ltd.
- Release date: 18 May 2012
- Country: Nepal
- Language: Nepali

Apabad is a 2012 Nepali-language drama film directed by Subash Koirala and starring Raj Ballav Koirala, Nisha Adhikari, Rabi Giri and Bijaya Giri.

== Plot ==
The film depicts an encounter between Suyog (Raj Ballav Koirala) and his experiences in a lonely and secluded island after trying to escape his good for nothing fate. Facing failures even before starting his career, Suyog decides to put an end to all his miseries. However, death betrays him and he reaches an isolated island where he faces a hard time for self survival.

On the other hand, Sunanda (Nisha Adhikari), is a friend in need to Suyog. However, after the supposed demise of her friend, the sympathy turns into love as the lady reads the boy's personal diary.

Suyog finally defeats loneliness and finds a way out of the abandoned land.

== Cast ==
- Raj Ballav Koirala as Suyog
- Nisha Adhikari as Sunanda
- Rabi Giri
- Bijaya Giri
