= Kalo Pothi: The Black Hen =

- Theatrical poster
- Directed by: Min Bahadur Bham
- Screenplay by: Min Bahadur Bham & Abinash Bikram Shah
- Story by: Min Bahadur Bham; Abinash Bikram Shah; Santosh Bhattarai; Kushang Rai
- Produced by: Anna Katchko; Tsering Rhitar Sherpa; Min Bahadur Bham; Debaki Rai; Catherine Dussart; Anup Thapa
- Starring: Khadka Raj Nepali; Sukraj Rokaya; Jit Bahadur Malla; Benisha Hamal; Hansa Khadka; Nanda Prashad Khatri; Bipin Karki; Praween Khatiwada
- Music by: Jason Kunwar
- Production companies: Shooney Films (Nepal); Mila Productions (Nepal); Kaldhungi Films (Nepal); Tandem Production (Germany); CDP (France)
- Distributed by: WIDE Management (FRANCE)
- Release dates: 4 September 2015 (Venice); 3 June 2016 (Nepal)
- Running time: 90 minutes
- Country: Nepal
- Language: Nepali
- Budget: रु 30 Million
- Box office: रु 100,690,340

Kalo Pothi: The Black Hen (Nepali: Kalo Pothi) is a 2015 drama film directed by Min Bahadur Bham and produced by Anna Katchko, Tsering Rhitar Sherpa, Min Bahadur Bham, Debaki Rai, Catherine Dussart and Anup Thapa.

The story takes place in Mugu, a district in north-west Nepal in 2001 during the Nepalese civil war (1996–2006). It is the first Nepali film to be screened at the Venice Film Festival. It was selected as the Nepalese entry for the Best Foreign Language Film at the 89th Academy Awards but it was not nominated. It is also the highest grossing Nepali film in overseas and one of the highest-grossing films in Nepal.

== Plot ==
The film is based on a journey embarked by two friends, Prakash and Kiran, belonging to different castes in search of a missing hen, unaware of the tyranny brought by the fragile ceasefire during the Nepalese civil war.

== Cast ==
- Khadka Raj Nepali as Prakash
- Sukraj Rokaya as Kiran
- Jit Bahadur Malla as Prakash's father
- Benisha Hamal as Kiran's sister
- Hansa Khadka as Prakash's sister
- Nanda Prashad Khatri
- Bipin Karki
- Praween Khatiwada

== Reception ==
The film opened to generally positive reviews. Sophia Pande of Nepali Times wrote that the film is "an example of the new wave of Nepali cinema, the kind that chooses to portray stories with truth and heart, over melodrama and action". The Himalayan Times wrote in its review: "A mixture of tragedy and comedy, while portraying the brother-sister bond, friendship, caste-based discrimination and the then time of Maoist insurgency in the country, Kalo Pothi has been made with finesse". Clarence Tsui of The Hollywood Reporter wrote "Bolstered by stirring performances from his cast, Bham and his crew have produced an evocative piece about harsh lives unraveling in a war-torn, rustic land. Mixing moments of humor and tragedy, along with realism and the ethereal — the latter embodied in fantastic dream sequences illustrating Prakash’s suppressed feelings of grief and loss — Black Hen is an effective showcase of a promising filmmaker in flight".

== Awards ==
- Best Film at Venice International Film Festival, Critics Week, 2015

== See also ==
- List of submissions to the 89th Academy Awards for Best Foreign Language Film
- List of Nepalese submissions for the Academy Award for Best Foreign Language Film
