= Benisha Hamal =

Nepalese actress (b. 1992)

- बेनिशा हमाल
- Born: July 25, 1992 (age 34); Gitanagar, Amarbasti, Chitwan
- Education: Goldengate International College
- Occupations: Actor; Model; RJ
- Years active: 2006-present
- Known for: Swor, Mahasush, Kalo Pothi, King, Mokshya, Jhyanakuti, BlindRocks, Ghar

Benisha Hamal (Nepali: बेनिशा हमाल; born July 25, 1992) is a Nepalese radio jockey, model, and actress known for her work in Nepali cinema. She has worked on over a dozen films and more than one hundred music videos. She won several awards, including a national award in 2018 for her film Blind Rocks.

== Personal life and education ==
Benisha Hamal was born to Bheshraj Hamal and Shakuntala Hamal in Chitwan, Nepal. She completed her primary-level education at Golden Future Boarding English School and her School Leaving Certificate (SLC) at Arunodaya Higher Secondary School. She completed her +2 level from Shanti Academy, Bharatpur. For her higher studies, she went to Kathmandu in 2007 and did her BA from Kantipur College of Business Management and Humanities (major English and Mass Communication) and her MA from Goldengate International College.

== Career ==
Hamal worked as an RJ in Kalika FM, Bharatpur, after winning the second runner-up title of "Ideal RJ" organized by the FM itself. She also worked as VJ in various Nepali TV channels: Channel Nepal, NTV Plus and NTV. In 2009, she started her modelling career. She also appeared in many TV commercials, including ads for Yum Yum Noodles, Rio Juice, UTL, Rose Village Housing, Nova Ice-cream and Wego Scooty.

She has also appeared in music videos including Sindhuli Ko by Paul Rai, Timi Arkai Ghar Ko Manche by Hemant Sharma, Aau milli by Buddha Shakya, Tadha by Babin Pradhan, Chot Khada Khada by Manoj Raj and Ek patak by Rupa Bista.

Her debut film as an actress was Swor directed by Prasanna Poudel in 2010. Since then have starred in films like Jyaan Hajir Chha (2012), Mokshya (2014), and Blind Rocks (2018). Her recent movie "Chakka Panja 4," released in 2023, was a hit in the Nepali movie industry.

== Filmography ==
Key
| † | Denotes films that have not yet been released |

| Year | Film | Role | Ref(s) |
|---|---|---|---|
| 2010 | Swor-The Melody of Dreams | | |
| 2012 | Luck | | |
| 2012 | Jyaan Hajir Chha | | |
| 2013 | Mahasush | | |
| 2014 | Mokshya | Smriti | |
| 2016 | Kalo Pothi | Kiran's sister | |
| 2017 | King Returns | Aarati | |
| 2017 | Jhyanakuti | Malati | |
| 2018 | Blind Rocks | Shristi | |
| 2018 | Changa Chet | | |
| 2019 | Ghar | Maya | |
| 2022 | Premganj | Maina | |
| 2023 | Chi Musi Chi - Even Dead Desire Belonging | Dr Meera | |
| 2023 | Chhakka Panja 4 | Alisha | |
| 2024 | Upahaar † | | |

== Awards ==
- CG kamana award 2014 in supporting role
- National Award 2018
- CG Kamana film awards 2018
- NFDC National award 2018
