= Raj Ballav Koirala =

Nepalese actor (born 1982)

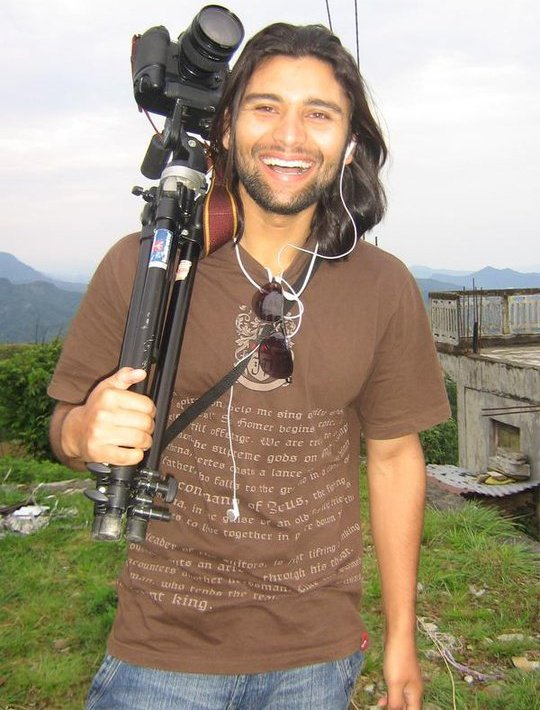
- Born: Raj Ballav Koirala; August 31, 1982 (age 44); Pokhara, Nepal
- Other name: RBK
- Occupations: Actor, producer
- Years active: 1996–present
- Website: www.rajballavkoirala.com.np

Raj Ballav Koirala (Nepali: राजबल्लभ कोइराला, born August 31, 1982) is a Nepalese film actor.

== Career ==
Raj Ballav Koirala began his career as a RJ at Pokhara F.M 95.8, Pokhara, Nepal, before modeling, and acting. He first gained attention for his performance for the music video of the song, Bheteyara Chuttnu by Karna Das His major breakthrough was as the lead actor for the movie, Parkhi Basen which celebrated its 100th day of Release in cinema halls on August 8, 2008. With over 20 films to his credit and his applauded performances in movies like Apabad, Masaan and Pal, he is already considered one of the important actor of the Nepali Films.

== Honours ==
In October 2008, he received the award for Best Debut Actor (Male) at the prestigious KTV Film Awards, organized by the Nepal Film Technician Association. He also won the Best Actor in a Negative Role award at the Digital Cinema Awards and Box Office Awards in the year 2010. Raj Ballav Koirala was also awarded the Outstanding Youth of the Year (2011) award by the JCI International, Nepal Jaycees.

== Influences ==
Raj Ballav Koirala has been known to be inspired by actors like Hari Bansha Acharya, Nir Shah, Naseeruddin Shah, Om Puri, Robert De Niro, Daniel Day-Lewis, Johnny Depp and Leonardo DiCaprio.

== Feature films ==
- Parkhi Basen (2007)
- Hey Yuwa (2007)
- Deewanapan (2008)
- Samjhana (2008)
- Guru Dakshina (2008)
- Chadi Gaye Paap Lagla (2008)
- Phailo Phailo Maya (2008)
- Hasi Deu Ek Phera (2008)
- Kasam Hajur Ko (2009)
- Timi Matra Timi (2009)
- Baas Ma Chaina Yo Maan (2009)
- Swor (2010)
- Kina Lagcha Maya (2010)
- Pal (2010)
- Malai Maan paryo (2010)
- Phool (2010)
- Preeti Ko Phool (2010)
- Masaan (2011)
- Samjhi Diye Pugcha (2011)
- Apabad (2012)
- So Simple (2012)
- Kohi Ta Cha (2013)
- Highway to Dhampus (2013)
- Ritu (2013)
