= Stalking Santa =

- Directed by: Greg Kiefer
- Written by: Daryn Tufts
- Produced by: Rick McFarland
- Starring: Chris Clark; Daryn Tufts; Lisa Clark
- Cinematography: Greg Kiefer
- Production company: Cosmic Pictures
- Distributed by: Excel Entertainment Group
- Release date: 2006
- Country: United States
- Language: English

Stalking Santa is a 2006 comedy Christmas feature film directed by Greg Kiefer, written by Daryn Tufts, starring Chris Clark, Daryn Tufts, Lisa Clark, and narrated by William Shatner. It follows one man's obsession to scientifically prove the existence of the famous Jolly Old Elf, better known as Santa Claus or Father Christmas.

== Plot ==
Shot in the mockumentary style, the film follows Lloyd Darrow (Chris Clark) a self-proclaimed "Santologist," who has made it his life's mission - and obsession - to scientifically prove the existence of Santa Claus. It's an obsession that takes him from the hieroglyphics of Egypt to a Midwestern shopping mall at Christmastime, as his friends and family wonder whether he has lost his mind. Throughout this journey Darrow must also deal with his wife Barb (Lisa Clark), who supports him both emotionally and financially, the dysfunctional devotion from his intern Clarence (Daryn Tufts), and a growing resentment from his 12-year-old son Keith (Simon Taylor).

William Shatner is the film's unseen narrator and interviewer.

== Cast ==
- Chris Clark: Lloyd Darrow, the man obsessed with proving Santa's existence.
- Daryn Tufts: Clarence Onstott, Lloyd's needy, nerdy intern.
- Lisa Clark: Barbara Darrow, Lloyd's ever-patient wife.
- William Shatner: Himself, as narrator.
- Simon Taylor: Keith Darrow, Lloyd's son
