= Nisha Adhikari =

Nepalese actress

Nisha Adhikari Malla
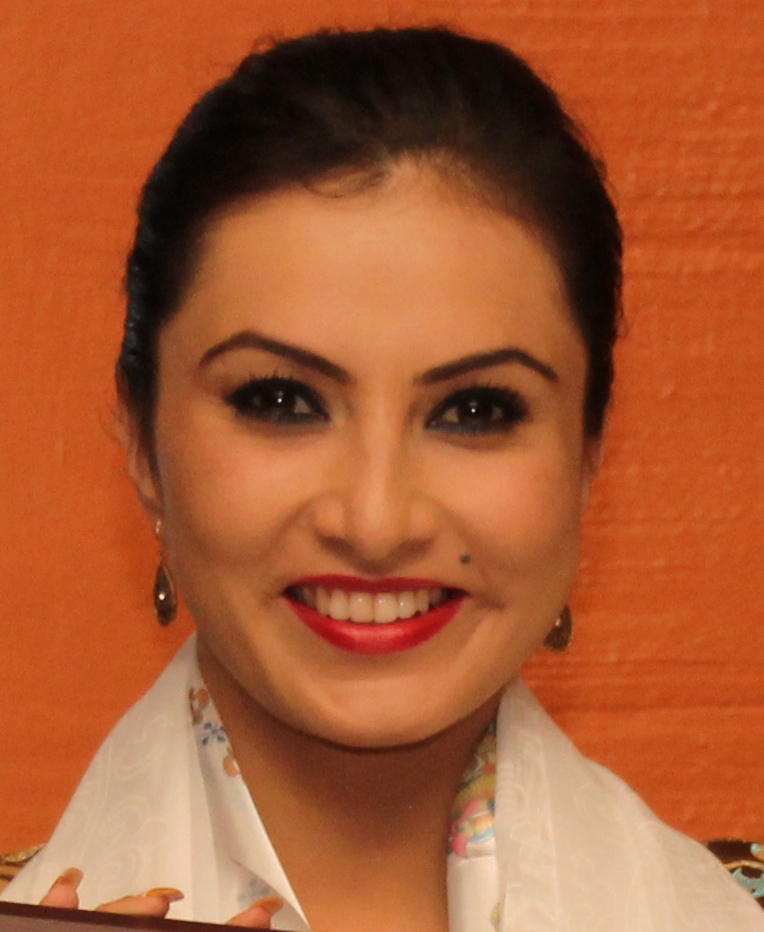
- Nisha Adhikari in 2016
- Born: Nisha Adhikari; Kathmandu, Nepal
- Citizenship: Nepal
- Occupations: Actress; model; beauty pageant
- Years active: 2005–present
- Spouse: Sharad Vesawkar

Nisha Adhikari Malla (Nepali: निशा अधिकारी) is a Nepalese film actress and model.

Adhikari made her acting debut in a comedy programme called Gharbeti Ba on Kantipur Television. Her debut movie was Mission Paisa (2009) starring Nikhil Upreti, which was one of the most successful movies of its release year in Nepal. In 2010, she appeared in the films Nainraresham and First Love, the latter having a record-breaking run, with demands for reruns in theatres.

== Filmography ==
=== Television series ===
Television series
Year	Film	Role	Notes
2006	Gharbeti Ba	Lead	
2006	Sanskar	Lead	
2006	Hotel	Lead	Pakistani
2006	Ek Thi Ladki Nepali	Lead	Pakistani
2006	Cafe Kantipur		
2021	Crime Files		

=== Films ===
Film
Year	Film	Role	Notes
2009	Mission Paisa	Lead Role	
2010	First Love	Lead Role	
2010	Nainraresham	Lead Role	
2012	Mayaz Bar	Lead Role	
2012	Apabad	Lead Role	Patrakar Attack
2012	Dhuwa yo nasha	Lead Role	
2012	Soongava	Lead Role	First Nepalese lesbian film
2013	Snow Flowers	Lead Role	First ever LGBT Nepali movie
2013	Padmini	Lead Role	
2014	Mero Valentine	Lead Role	
2014	Mission Paisa Reloaded	Lead Role	
2014	Bhimdutta	Lead Role	
2014	Mukhauta	Lead Role	
2015	Aavash		
2016	Jai Parshuram		Biraj Bhatta comeback film
2016	How Funny	Heera i	
2017	Kumbhakarna	Primary school teacher	
2011	Pal		

=== Music videos ===
Year	Title	Artist(s)	Role	Ref.
2011	"Never Gonna Leave This Bed"	Maroon 5	Herself	

== Personal life ==
She was married to Nepalese cricketer Sharad Vesawkar.
