= 12 Gaun =

2024 Nepali film directed by Biraj Bhatta

- Theatrical release poster
- Nepali: १२ गाउँ
- Directed by: Biraj Bhatta
- Written by: Santosh Sarkar
- Produced by: Saraswati Bhatta
- Starring: Biraj Bhatta; Samir Bhatt; Sonu Chandrapal; Deeya Maskey; Murali Dhar; Sanisha Bhattarai; Nancy Khadka
- Edited by: Bhupendra Adhikari; Praveen K. L.
- Music by: Arjun Pokharel; Niraj Singh Kalacharan(BGM)
- Production company: Biraj Bhatt Film Production
- Distributed by: Kafiya Films; Kuber Cine Distribution
- Release date: October 10, 2024
- Running time: 137 mins
- Country: Nepal
- Language: Nepali
- Budget: est.रू4 crore
- Box office: est.रू26.40 crore

12 Gaun (Nepali: १२ गाउँ) is a 2024 Nepali action drama film directed by Biraj Bhatta. Written by Santosh Sarkar, the film is produced by Saraswati Bhatta under the banner of Biraj Bhatt Film Production. The film was released on October 10, 2024, during the festival of Dashain. It stars Biraj Bhatta, Samir Bhatt, Sonu Chandrapal, Deeya Maskey, Murali Dhar, Sanisha Bhattarai, Naren Khadka, and Nancy Khadka. It is the debut film of Samir Bhatt, son of Biraj Bhatt, Sanisha Bhattarai, and Nancy Khadka, as well as the Nepali debut of Indian actress Sonu Chandrapal.

12 Gaun was released along Jwai Saab, and Chhakka Panja 5. The film met with mixed response from critics while performance of Samir Bhatt and background score were highly praised but story, screenplay and direction was heavily criticized but it met with positive feedback of audience, becoming one of the biggest hits in the history of Nepali Cinema. The film provided stardom to Samir Bhatt and marked a huge comeback for Biraj Bhatt in the Nepali film industry.

== Synopsis ==
The story revolves around a secluded village ruled by a ruthless antagonist Gajendra, who maintains absolute control with the help of corrupt politicians. A desperate couple attempts to escape Gajendra's tyranny to protect their unborn child. Their effort ends in a tragedy when the husband is killed, and the pregnant wife curses Gajendra, which precedes the shocking murder of the child in front of the entire village.

Twenty-two years later, the protagonist Ajay, emerges. In a dramatic fight scene, Ajay saves a woman, Ankita, from gangsters, quickly becoming the center of her attention. Meanwhile Arjun is introduced, seemingly involved in illicit activities like trafficking, but his true purpose is to fight against the crime. The film's mystery centers on Ajay's true identity, forcing the audience to piece together whether he is connected to the tragedy of two decades past and if he is the agent of the long-awaited revenge.

== Cast ==
- Biraj Bhatta as Arjun
- Samir Bhatt as Ajay
- Sonu Chandrapal as Ankita, Ajay's Love interest
- Deeya Maskey as Geeta, Karne's Wife
- Murali Dhar as Gajendra (Chief of 12 Gaun)
- Sanisha Bhattarai as Nisha
- Nancy Khadka as Shweta
- Naren Khadka as Police Officer
- Stunt Silva as Drug Dealer
- Santosh Sarkar as Girl Smuggler
- Kanij Koirala as Son of Gajendra
- Suleman Shankar as Biru (Friend of Arjun)
- Kalu Rana as Gajendra's Right Hand
- Krishna Bhatt as Karne
- Arjun Jung Shahi as Father of Arjun
- Bhisma Joshi as Journalist (Father of Nisha)

== Box office ==
The film broke several records at the box office and grossed रू10.50 crore in the first week, registering the biggest opening week for a film in 2024. It grossed रू19.93 crore at the Nepal box office making it the second highest grossing Nepali film of all time at the time of its release.
