= Mithila Sharma =

Nepalese actress

- मिथिला शर्मा
- Born: 16 October 1963 (age 62); Kathmandu
- Occupations: Actress, dancer, teacher
- Height: 1.67 m (5 ft 6 in)
- Spouse: Moti Lal Bohora (m. 2014)

Mithila Sharma (Nepali: मिथिला शर्मा) is a Nepalese actress and dancer. She has been acting in Nepali films, tele-serials and dancing at different stage programs and doing various musical dramas. She is known for Mukundo:Mask of Desire (2000), Karma (2006) and Undone by Love (2004). She taught performance arts in Kantishwori and St Mary's High School, up until 2021.

== Personal life and education ==
She was born on 16 October 1963 (30 Ashoj, 2020 BS) in Kathmandu.

Sharma is a graduate in Home Science and Dance who has worked in more than hundred films, more than a dozen serials, several musical dramas and numbers of stage shows. Mithila was married to Ex-IGP of Nepal Moti Lal Bohora in 2014.

== Career ==
Sharma started her career at the age of 9. She performed in Gopal Yonzan's song in front of the late King Birendra on his birthday.

She was first screened in the film Biswas directed by Chetan Karki for a role of a dance teacher which widened her path in the Nepali film industry. Her role as "Gita" in Mask of Desire took her to the international film industry. Her works in films like Mukundo, Sukha Dukha, Didi, Muna Madan, Basai and Afno Manchhe are still well received which are also Sharma's favourites. She has always given preference to the character roles rather than the commercial lead roles in her film career. She also teaches singing and dancing at Kantishwori and St Mary's High School, Jawlakhel, Nepal.

She was one of the judges for the Nepalese reality dance talent show Chham Chhami that aired on Nepal Television.

== Filmography ==
Mithila Sharma has acted in about 100 movies, more than 25 plays and in more than 200 telefilms. In addition to dancing and acting she has also written and directed 10 musicals.

=== Film ===
Year	Title	Role	Notes
1986	Biswas		Debut Movie
1989	Pachhis Basanta		
1989	Cheli Beti		
1990	Adhikar		
1995	Mahamaya		
2000	Mask of Desire	Gita	
2001	Aafno Manchhe		
2002	Lahana		
2003	Je Bho Ramrai Bho	Aama Hajur	
2003	Muna Madan	Didi	
2004	Sukha Dukha	Ram's Mother	
2005	Muglan	Sanu's mother	
2005	Basain		
2006	Duniya		
2006	Karma	Gita	
2008	Mr. Mangale		
2008	Kaha Bhetiyela	Abhishek's Mother	
2009	Silsila	Rawal's Mother	
2010	Pooja	Pooja's Mother	Short Movie
2010	Nai Nabhannu La	Ritu's Mother	
2010	Hansi Deu Ek Phera	Bishtodhar's Mother	
2011	Jaba Jaba Maya Bascha	Shrawan's Mother	
2013	Uma	Uma and Milan's Mother	
2014	Kohinoor		
2015	Ajhai Pani	Kushal's grandmother	
2017	Aadha Love		
2018	Mangalam		
2019	The Man from Kathmandu	Renu Bhandari	
	Kathaputali	Budi Amai	
2019	Basenji	Nisha	
2020	Aama	Aama	

== Television ==
Year	Title	Role	Notes	Ref.
	Mutuko Betha	Lead role	Popular Nepali teleserial	
2015	Singha Durbar	Nandini Thapa		
2020	Chamchami	Judge		

== See also ==
- Gauri Malla
- Bhuwan Chand
