= Ghar (2019 film) =

2019 Nepali film written & directed by Arpan Thapa

- Theatrical release poster
- Nepali: घर
- Directed by: Arpan Thapa
- Written by: Arpan Thapa
- Produced by: Sharmila Pandey; Santosh Adhikari
- Starring: Arpan Thapa; Surakshya Panta; Benisha Hamal; Asmita Khanal; Saroj Aryal
- Cinematography: Niraj Kadel
- Edited by: Milan Shrestha
- Production company: DS Digital
- Distributed by: DS Digital; FD Company
- Release date: July 19, 2019 (Nepal)
- Running time: 104 minutes
- Country: Nepal
- Language: Nepali

Ghar (Nepali: घर; transl. House) is a 2019 Nepali horror film written and directed by Arpan Thapa under the banner of DS Digital in association with ASAP Entertainment. It is produced by Sharmila Pandey and Santosh Adhikari. Released on July 19, 2019, the film stars Arpan Thapa, Surakshya Panta, Benisha Hamal, Asmita Khanal, and Saroj Aryal.

== Synopsis ==
Despite the rumors of ghostly activity, couples buy house for less than what it's worth. They move into that new house, and all of a sudden they start to feel the presence of a supernatural being, because of unusual occurrences that occur in the house.

== Cast ==
- Arpan Thapa as Shiva
- Surakshya Panta as Saru
- Benisha Hamal as Maya
- Asmita Khanal
- Saroj Aryal
- Shristi Maharjan
- Bikash Khanal

== Crew ==
- Arpan Thapa – Director, writer
- Sharmila Pandey – Producer
- Santosh Adhikari – Producer
- Niraj Kadel – Cinematographer
- Milan Shrestha – Editor
- Shankar Pandey – Production designer
- Shree Krishna Shrestha – Visual effects
- Manoj Shrestha – Visual effects

== Reception ==
Ghar received mixed reviews from critics; most called it "cliché" in comparison to Hollywood horror films, while they praised it in the Nepali context, and some even called it one of the best Nepali films made in the horror genre.

Sunny Mahat from The Annapurna Express gave it a rating of 4 stars. He suggested audience not to watch the film alone; he wrote: "Not exaggerating at all when we say that this has to be the scariest Nepali movie ever made, giving tough competition even to its Bollywood contemporaries."

Abhimanyu Dixit from The Kathmandu Post gave the rating of 2 stars. He wrote: "Ghar is not even trying to stand out. It is an attempt at by-the-numbers supernatural horror, with no likeable characters, all the clichés in the book, and irritatingly loud sound effects. All of these end up making the film campy, exaggerated and gimmicky, rather than scary."

Diwakar Pyakurel from Online Khabar gave the rating of 2.5 stars. He wrote: "Comparing the movie against benchmarks of Hollywood horror films, Ghar would not meet the standards; but in the Nepali context, this production definitely stands out."
