= Akki Sharma =

Nepali visual effects artist and editor

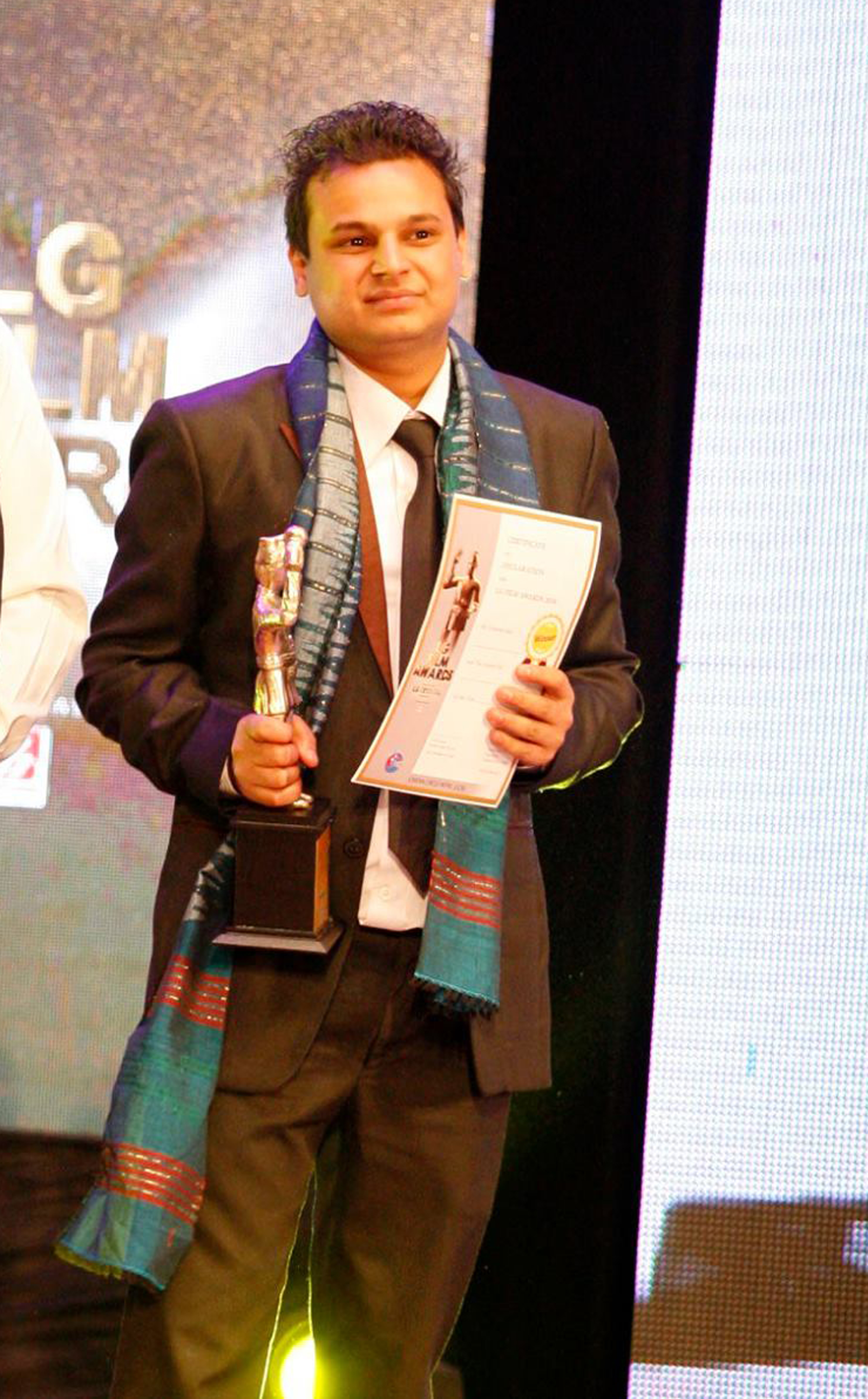
- Born: June 14, 1991; Jhapa, Nepal
- Occupations: Visual effects artist; film editor; short film director
- Years active: 2010–present
- Known for: Akki Sharma
- Parents: Hari Kumar Acharya (father); Kumari Siwakoti (mother)
- Awards: LG Film Award Nepal 2016; Box Office Film Award 2016 For Nai Nabhannu La 2

Niraj Acharya also known as Akki Sharma (born June 14, 1991) is a Nepali visual effects artist and film editor, who has won LG Film Award as The Best VFX of the year 2016 for Champion (Nepali movie).

== Early life ==
Sharma was born in Jhapa, Nepal. He worked for several project and companies as a visual effects artist and film editor.

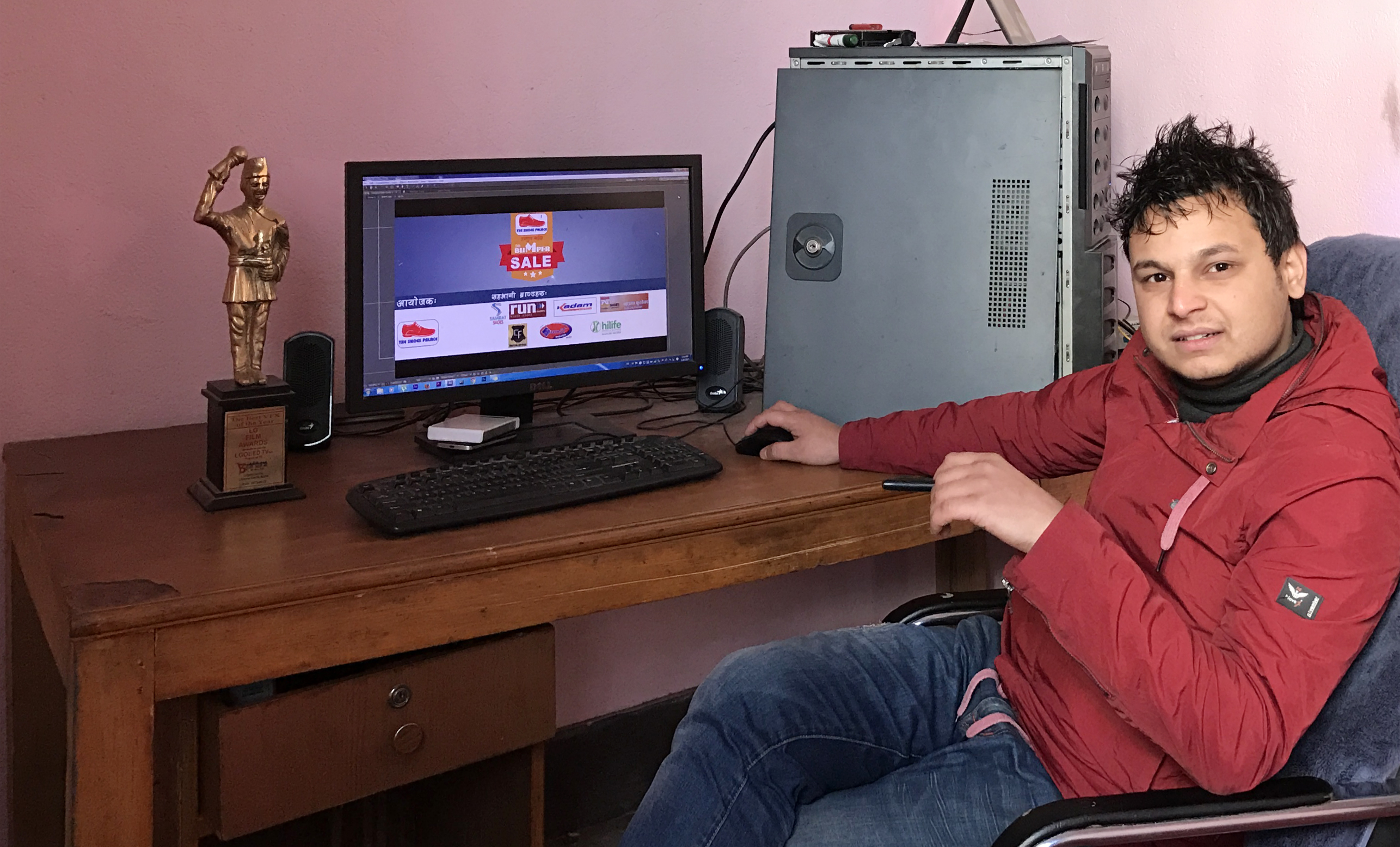
Sharma at his studio

== Filmography ==
Movie	Year	Role
Taandro	2015	VFX artist
Tista Pariko Saino	2016	VFX lead
Ma Ta Timrai Hoon	2016	VFX lead
LAKSHYA	2016	VFX lead
Pardeshi	2015	VFX artist
November Rain (2014 film)	2014	VFX lead
Manav	2013	VFX lead
Loveforever	2013	VFX lead
April fool	2013	VFX artist
LOOT COMPANY	2013	VFX artist
JAALO(upcoming movie)	2017	VFX lead
Birkhey Lai Chinchhas	2014	VFX lead
Dying Candle	2017	VFX artist
veer	2014	VFX lead
War	2013	VFX lead
My Promise	2015	VFX lead
Desh Khojdai Jada (In Search of Nation)	2014	VFX artist
Adhakatti	2015	VFX artist
Bhool Bhulaiya(Nepali)	2015	VFX artist

== Awards and nominations ==
Year	Award	Category	Work	Result
2014	Box Office Film Award 2014	VFX	Nai Nabhannu la 2	Won
2016	LG Film Award Nepal 2016	Champion	VFX	Won
