= Halkara =

2023 Nepalese drama film

- Theatrical release poster
- Directed by: Bikram Sapkota
- Written by: Aakash Baral; Viplop Pratik; Bikram Sapkota
- Produced by: Bikram Sapkota
- Starring: Mahesh Tripathi; Binita Thapa Magar
- Cinematography: Chintan Rajbhandari
- Edited by: Bikram Sapkota
- Music by: Bruno Valenti
- Production companies: Kalipaar Studios; Icefall Productions
- Release dates: 23 April 2022 (WorldFest); 12 May 2023 (Nepal)
- Running time: 110 minutes
- Country: Nepal
- Language: Nepali

Halkara, also known as The Postman, is a 2022 Nepalese drama film directed by Bikram Sapkota which features Mahesh Tripathi and Binita Thapa Magar in the titular role. On 18 September 2023, the film was selected as the Nepalese entry for Best International Feature Film at the 96th Academy Awards.

== Cast ==
- Mahesh Tripathi as Ram
- Binita Thapa Magar as Mia
- Umesh Tamang as Our Guy
- Pashupati Rai as Devi
- Sarda Giri as Hari Kumari
- Bishnu Bhakta Adhikari as Bahadur
- Deepak Chhetri as Thul Dai
- Prakash Dahal as Keshav
- Bidhya Karki as Guna Maya
- Roshni Karki as Gita

== Release and reception ==
Halkara had its world premiere on April 23, 2022, at the 55th WorldFest-Houston International Film Festival. It was commercially released on May 12, 2023, in Nepalese theaters.

=== Critical response ===
Saugat Nepal reviewing for The Kathmandu Post praised the film describing it as "a captivating tale of letters and hope". He praised the direction writing, "Kudos to director Bikram Sapkota for crafting such a unique and delightful film." He also commended the performance of the lead actors, screenplay, cinematography and music.

== Awards ==
Awards	Category	Recipient(s)	Outcome	Ref.
WorldFest-Houston International Film Festival	Platinum Remi	Halkara	Won	
WorldFest-Houston International Film Festival	Best Actor	Mahesh Tripathi	Won	
WorldFest-Houston International Film Festival	Best Cinematographer	Chintan Raj Bhandari	Won	
Nepal America International Film Festival	Best Long Narrative	Halkara	Won	

== See also ==
- List of submissions to the 96th Academy Awards for Best International Feature Film
- List of Nepalese submissions for the Academy Award for Best International Feature Film
