= Anjila (film) =

2025 sports drama film by Milan Chams

- Theatrical release poster
- Directed by: Milan Chams
- Written by: Giriraj Ghimire
- Produced by: Prem Kumar Shrestha
- Starring: Anjila Tumbapo Subba; Dayahang Rai; Srijana Subba; Maotse Gurung
- Cinematography: Bibik Lama
- Edited by: Milan Shrestha
- Music by: Score: Alish Karki; Songs: Rajan Raj Shiwakoti
- Production company: Moon Love Entertainment
- Distributed by: 7 Seas International / United Kingdom
- Release date: 13 March 2025
- Running time: 146 minutes
- Country: Nepal
- Language: Nepali
- Box office: US$8,050 (UAE)

Anjila is a 2025 Nepali-language biographical sports drama film directed by Milan Chams from a screenplay written by Giriraj Ghimire. The film is based on the real life of Anjila Tumbapo Subba, goalkeeper and captain for Nepal women's national football team. She has portrayed herself with Dayahang Rai and Srijana Subba in supporting roles.

It was selected as the Nepalese entry for the Best International Feature Film at the 98th Academy Awards, but it was not nominated.

== Synopsis ==
The film chronicles the life of Anjila Tumbapo Subba, ex-captain and goalkeeper of the Nepal women's national football team. Based on her real-life story, it follows her journey from childhood through the challenges and milestones that shaped her career. The narrative highlights her perseverance, discipline, and rise to prominence within Nepal's football landscape, offering insight into the personal and professional struggles she overcame to become a key figure in the sport.

== Cast ==
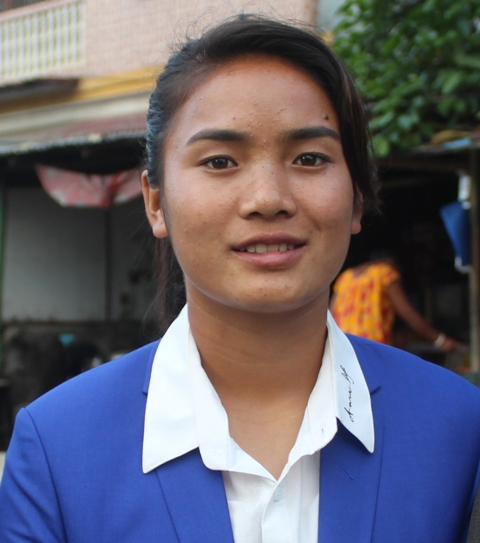
Anjila Tumbapo Subba

- Anjila Tumbapo Subba as herself, the first captain of the Nepal women's national football team
- Dayahang Rai as Anjila's father
- Srijana Subba as Anjila's mother
- Bijay Baral as journalist
- Maotse Gurung as Anjila's coach
- Sunil Thapa as village elder and leader
- Sumeen Gurung as Anjila's brother
- Buddhi Tamang as motivator teammate
- Birup Ghale
- Baldip Rai
- Manju Shrestha
- Suraj Tamu
- Bedana Rai

== Production ==
The film was shot in 34 days in November and December 2023. The film began filming in Aitabare in Ilam, Anjila's hometown. Later it was shot in Jhapa and Kathmandu and ended at Tinkune area of Kathmandu.

Music

Soundtrack is composed by Rajan Raj Siwakoti on lyrics by himself.

The song "Dalle Dalle Khursani" is sung by Rajan Raj Siwakoti and Melina Rai.

The Song "Raat Kina Hunchha Hajur" is composed by Thaneshwork Gautam, penned by Prava Bartaula and sung by Thaneshwor Gautam and Shanti Shree Pariyar.

== Release ==
Anjila was released on 13 March 2025 in Nepal.

The film was released in the United States, Croatia, Qatar, Bahrain, Malta, Denmark, Portugal, Hong Kong, South Korea, Finland, Canada, Dubai, Singapore, Japan, Belgium and Sweden on 29 March 2025.

It was released in United Arab Emirates on 3 April 2025.

== Oscar controversy ==
The film is embroiled in a controversy regarding its submission as the Nepalese entry for the Best International Feature Film at the 98th Academy Awards. Between claims and counter claims, The filmmakers involved in the dispute are urging Nepal to scrap the current selection and begin the process again. They want a clear and fair system, including a 30-day open application period and independent supervision. In short, they’re asking the Academy to reject the existing choice as invalid.

== Reception ==
The film earned Nepalese rupee17.1 million nationally in 5 days of its release.

== See also ==
- List of submissions to the 98th Academy Awards for Best International Feature Film
- List of Nepalese submissions for the Academy Award for Best International Feature Film
