= Panchayat (film) =

- Nepali: पंचायत
- Directed by: Shivam Adhikari
- Story by: Shivam Adhikari
- Based on: Panchayat (Nepal)
- Produced by: Sushanta Shrestha; Sankhar Shrestha
- Starring: Neeta Dhungana; Saroj Khanal; Rupa Rana; Ganesh Giti; Jahanwi Basnet; Bishal Pahari
- Production company: Kalawati Films
- Release dates: October 2017 (San Francisco); 16 March 2018 (Nepal)
- Running time: 138 minutes
- Country: Nepal
- Language: Nepali

Panchayat (Nepali:पंचायत) is a 2017 Nepalese drama social film, directed and written by Shivam Adhikari and produced by Sushanta Shrestha and Sankhar Shrestha, under the banner Kalawati Films with NepalFlix and Hetauda Movies. The film is based on panchayat system in Nepal and it is mainly aimed at women and the film is set in 1974. The film stars Neeta Dhungana in the lead role along with Saroj Khanal, Rupa Rana, Ganesh Giti, Jahanwi Basnet and Bishal Pahari. It was selected as the Nepalese entry for the Best Foreign Language Film at the 91st Academy Awards, but it was not nominated.

== Plot ==
The film is based on Nepalese Panchayat system in Nepal while in Nepalese king Birendra of Nepal's times.

== Cast ==
- Neeta Dhungana as Girl
- Saroj Khanal as Kaji
- Rupa Rana
- Ganesh Giti
- Jahanwi Basnet
- Bishal Pahari

== Awards ==
Award	Date of ceremony	Category	Recipient(s) and nominee(s)	Result	Ref(s)
Francisco International New Concept Film Festival	2017	Best Leading Actress Award	Neeta Dhungana	Won	

== See also ==
- List of submissions to the 91st Academy Awards for Best Foreign Language Film
- List of Nepalese submissions for the Academy Award for Best Foreign Language Film
