= Anup Baral =

Nepalese actor

- Born: 4 April 1968 (age 58); Pokhara
- Occupations: Actor, director
- Spouse: Deeya Maskey (m. 2014)

Anup Baral (Nepali: अनुप बराल) (born 1968) is a Nepalese actor, writer, and director.

== Early life and education ==
Anup Baral was born on April 4, 1968, in Pokhara, Nepal, and grew up in the Nadipur neighborhood. As a child, he developed a deep obsession with cinema, frequently skipping classes at Multi-purpose High School to watch films at the local Kalpana Cinema Hall, sometimes trading household utensils for entry tickets. He began acting in local theater at age 13 in a social play titled Timi Bachnu Parchha and was heavily influenced by veteran playwright Saru Bhakta. In 1990, he founded the Pratibimb Theatre Laboratory in Pokhara, which quickly won a national drama award in Kathmandu.Baral pursued higher education at Tribhuvan University in Nepal before moving to New Delhi, India, for professional dramatic training. He enrolled at the prestigious National School of Drama (NSD), graduating in 1994 with a specialization in acting. His training in India focused heavily on modern acting methodologies, including the Stanislavski method, which became the foundation for his future career as a director and acting coach upon his return to Nepal.

== Filmography ==
Year	Title	Credit
1998	Aanshawanda	Cast
2004	Lakshya	
2008	Kagbeni	
2010	Dasdhunga	
2010	Ek Din Ek Raat	
2011	Batch No 16	
2011	Pal	
2013	Badhsala	
2014	Fitkiree	
2014	Tandav (Nepali Movie)	
2014	Junge	
2015	Sadanga	
2016	Fanko	
2018	Damaruko Dandibiyo	
2022	Dokh	Director
2022	Pani Photo	Actor
2022	Prakash	Casting Director
2025	Basanta	Actor

== Awards ==
- National film award for the movie Das Dhunga.
- NEFTA Film Awards for supporting actor for the movie Damaruko Dandibiyo
