= Dying Candle =

- Official Poster
- Directed by: Naresh Kumar KC
- Written by: Naresh Kumar KC
- Produced by: Rabin Acharya, Uttam KC, Bimal Subedi
- Starring: Arpan Thapa; Saugat Malla; Srijana Subba
- Cinematography: Rabin Acharya; Dipankar Sikder
- Edited by: Bhupendra Adhikari; Akki Sharma(VFX)
- Music by: Dale Sumner
- Release date: 16 December 2016
- Country: Nepal
- Language: Nepali

Dying Candle Nepali language film directed by Naresh Kumar KC and produced by Rabin Acharya and Marie Adler. Set in a rural Himalayan village, the film explores themes of sacrifice, familial duty, and resilience within a close-knit family facing extreme hardships. It highlights cultural elements unique to Nepal, providing insight into traditional values and the challenges of rural life.

== Plot ==
Dying Candle follows Kshemi, a young woman in a rural Himalayan village in Nepal who becomes the primary caretaker of her family after her father's death. Traditionally a role for the son, Kshemi assumes responsibility due to her brother's illness and her family's dire need. Despite her personal dreams, she sacrifices for her family, often putting their needs above her own. In a moment of desperation, she reluctantly agrees to marry a wealthy but unscrupulous man, Janak Lai, to cover medical expenses for her ailing brother and mother, giving up her hopes of marrying her love, Mukunda. The story portrays themes of duty, sacrifice, and resilience amidst hardship.

== Cast ==
- Lakpa Singhi Tamang- Tipke
- Srijana Subba - Kshemi
- Saugat Malla - Janak Lal
- Arpan Thapa - Mukunda
- Bidhya Karki- Khyo (mother)
- Kesab Raj - Ksheden

== Awards and nominations ==
Awards	Category	Outcome
Queens World Film Festival	Best Cinematography in a Feature	Won
Queens World Film Festival	Best Feature Narrative, Best Actress in a Feature	Nominated
Cinema Verde Film Festival 2016	Peace Award	Won
