= Gauri Malla =

Nepalese actress

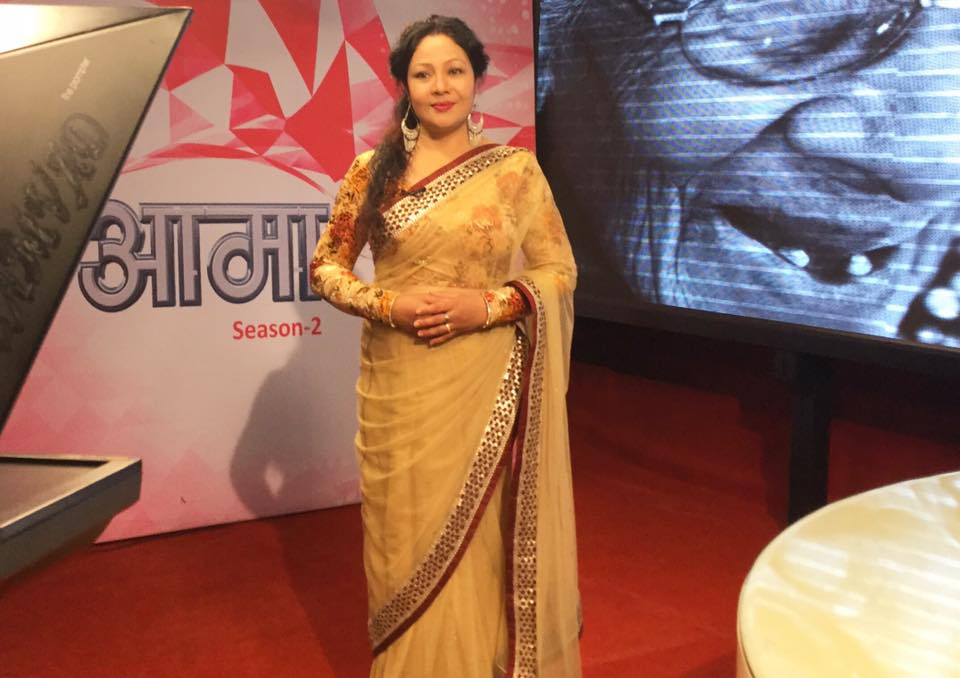
- Occupations: Actress, host, model

Gauri Malla (Nepali: गौरी मल्ल) is a Nepalese actress. In 2002, she was awarded Nepal's "Motion Picture Award" for best leading female. In 2003, she won the "Best Supporting Actress Award" at the first ever Lux Film Awards in Nepal. She is one of the Judge of Dancing with stars season 1 Nepal.

In 2002, she was awarded Nepal's "Motion Picture Award" and in 2003, she won the "Best Supporting Actress Award". She later moved to USA. She has returned Nepal in 2014 from United States.

== Filmography ==
Year	Title	Role	Note	Ref.
1989	Santaan	Buhari		
1990	Cheli Beti			
1991	Kanyadan			
1991	Lobhi Papi			
1992	Tapasya			
1993	Aandhi Beri			
1994	Chatyang			
1994	Naata			
1994	Swarga			
1995	Sarswati	Police Inspector		
1995	Maha Maya (Greatest Love)			
1996	Avatar			
1996	Raanko			
2000	Basanti	Queen		
2000	Mukundo	Saraswati		
2002	Sanyas			
2002	Mamaghar			
2002	Khandan	Manthara		
2002	Dhansamphati			
2002	Bakshis			
2009	Jungbaaz			
2010	Ishqiya	Mamta	Hindi film	
2016	Ke Ma Timro Hoina Ra	Mother		
2016	Gajalu	Mother		
2017	Blind rocks			
2019	Ghamad Shere	Sarala Thapa		
2022	Mahapurush			
2023	Big Girls Don't Cry	Hajuraama		

== Television ==
Year	Title	Role	Notes	Ref.
2015	Singha Durbar	PM		
2020	Dancing with the Stars Nepal	Judge		
2024	Comedy Darbar	Judge		
