= Kagbeni (film) =

2008 Nepalese film directed by Bhusan Dahal

- Theatrical poster
- Directed by: Bhusan Dahal
- Written by: Prashant Rasaily
- Based on: "The Monkey's Paw" by W. W. Jacobs
- Produced by: Bhaskar Dhungana, Nakim Uddin, Rajesh Siddhi
- Starring: Nima Rumba, Saugat Malla, Deeya Maskey, Hanif Mohammed, Pooja Gurung
- Cinematography: Bidur Pandey
- Distributed by: Quest Entertainment
- Release dates: January 6, 2008 (Hyderabad International Film Festival); January 11, 2008 (Nepal)
- Running time: 130 minutes
- Country: Nepal
- Language: Nepali

Kagbeni is a 2008 Nepali movie, loosely based on W. W. Jacobs's 1902 horror short story The Monkey's Paw. Kagbeni is the directorial debut of Bhusan Dahal. The name of the movie is taken from a tourist place Kagbeni in the valley of the Kali Gandaki, which is a two-hour trek from Muktinath. Kagbeni is considered to be a movie which changed the way people look at Nepali cinema, because it is seen as the first successful non-commercial movie in Nepal which was able to leave its mark in the film industry. Nepali critics now often describe non-commercial movies as 'post- Kagbeni era films'. Kagbeni was one of the few Nepali films during its time to manifest cinematography as one of the important elements in cinema.

== Plot ==
Krishna returns from Malaysia to the village of Kagbeni to meet his childhood friend Ramesh, who runs a small liquor business. Krishna suggests Ramesh to send his liquor to town to sell for more profit. Ramesh tells Krishna that he is going to a neighboring village Marpha and Krishna tags along to meet Amo, his aunt.

On their way to Marpha, they stop at a cave for the night. A mysterious hermit appears shortly. Krishna hands him the blanket that he has brought for Amo. In return, the hermit hands him a monkey's paw, which he claims to be magical. The hermit explains that the paw can fulfill the owner's wish but can bring a great disaster if anyone other than its owner uses it.

On the way back from Marpha, they meet a girl called Pema. Krishna shows Pema a photo of the girl with whom his parents are arranging his marriage. Pema tells them that the girl in the photo is Tara and that someone else also wants to marry her.

Ramesh wakes up in the middle of the night, takes the paw from Krishna and makes a wish to get Tara. Sometime later, as Krishna takes the monkey's paw in his hand, he loses his balance and falls off the hill in spite of Ramesh's efforts to save him with a rope.

The story then moves nine years later. Ramesh is married now with Tara and they have a son Bardaan. Their business has grown. One day, Ramesh is visited by Krishna, who survived the fall. That night, there is a big storm and heavy rainfall, which ruins the apple crop. Ramesh worries that he would not be able to fulfil his customers' orders.

Seeing the deteriorating situation at home, Tara makes a wish on the monkey's paw. The next day, their son Bardaan is run over by a tractor and dies. Both Ramesh and Tara are very much saddened by the incident; however, they get 1,50,000 as a compensation from the owner of the tractor. Ramesh is able to give the trader all the money he owes through this.

One day, while going to bed, Tara makes a wish to return their son. Suddenly, there is a tap on the door. But Ramesh struggles to get the paw from her and wishes they don't want their son back. When Tara opens the door, there is no one. As Ramesh decides to get rid of the paw forever, he makes one final wish that he'll never use it again. The paw is picked up by the once-again-alive Bardaan, who disappears with a flash.

== Production ==
The filmmakers brought high-definition digital cameras from Silicon Imaging, an American company that was just starting out. The cast and crew set off to Jomsom in October 2006 and shot for thirty days non-stop in Kagbeni, Jomsom, Marpha, and Shyang in Mustang district of Nepal.

There were some technical problems in the making of the film as it was the first time the film makers were using the camera. They had to walk a few hours to a cyber café to ask the company for instructions.

== Cast ==
- Saugat Malla as Ramesh
- Deeya Maskey as Tara
- Nima Rumba as Krishna
- Hanif Mohammed as Bishnu
- Pooja Gurung as Pema
- Vivek Gurung as Bardaan

== Critical reception ==
The film received mostly glowing reviews from critics. The Himalayan Times hailed it "a benchmark for Nepali films." While Kunda Dixit of Nepali Times called it "superbly crafted, seductively acted, meticulously directed," adding, "No longer will we have to be embarrassed about Nepali movies." Bishnu Gautam of The Rising Nepal joining in the choir, wrote, "It is not easy to bring out an impressive film with new faces, but Bhusan did it brilliantly. All the three protagonists, Saugat Malla (Ramesh), Deeya Maskey (Tara) and Nima Rumba (Krishna) are new faces but nowhere in Kagbeni are they seen as novices... It provides you with the taste of western films including the love scenes, which are free from vulgarities." Sanjog Rai of The Kathmandu Post, however, was the sole voice in panning the film, suggesting that it "harbingers the end of the digital delusion," elaborating on the trend of putting it "up for sainthood; it's almost as if the masses believe it is a beacon of ingenuity, and that it will single-handedly save Nepali cinema." His complaints included Quest Entertainment's excessive hype of the film, which had gone for more than a year before the film's release, the sound, which made him jump "even if the scenes were by no means frightening," the editing and the poor adaption, which he writes "hasn't much to sustain anyone's interest besides the naturally gorgeous scenes shot in Kagbeni, Jomsom, Syang and Marpha."

== Influence ==
Kagbeni was expected to be a trend-setting Nepali film with new taste of technology and story for the Nepali audience, which it did to some extent. Although the cinema halls didn't see the response as was expected, it started off really good with a new director and actors. Bhusan Dahal was a music video director and this was his debut film. Saugat Malla and Deeya Maskey are well-known theatre actors. Nima Rumba is a popular Nepali singer. The movie was also hyped for its sizzling kissing scene between the two lead actors.

After Kagbeni, there have been some new movies of the same quality. Sano Sansar by music video director Alok Nembang is based on youths in the city and Mission Paisa is an action movie. Dasdhunga, an investigation-based movie on the mysterious death of Madan Bhandari and Jiv Raj Ashrit in 2050 BS, and 13246, a documentary-cum-movie on the decade-long Maoist conflict in Nepal, followed the trend set by Kagbeni. Dasdhunga was directed by Manoj Pandit and 13246 by Apil Bista.

== Box office ==
The film was released in Nepal on 10 January 2008. The film got a phenomenal response in the urban areas like Kathmandu, Pokhara, Narayangarh, etc. while the rural areas had decent collections. The movie collected Rs 40 lacs in its opening week, thus creating a new history in the Nepali cinema industry. The film grossed about Rs 3 crores from its theatrical run. The film did well in the international market too, especially in the United States, the United Kingdom and Hong Kong where the Nepalese population is in decent number.

== Awards ==
Kagbeni was selected in some of the international film festivals.

- Shanghai International Film Festival 2008: Official Selection
- Mumbai International Film Festival 2008: Official Selection
- Hyderabad International Film Festival 2008: Official Selection
