= Sonu Chandrapal =

Indian television actress

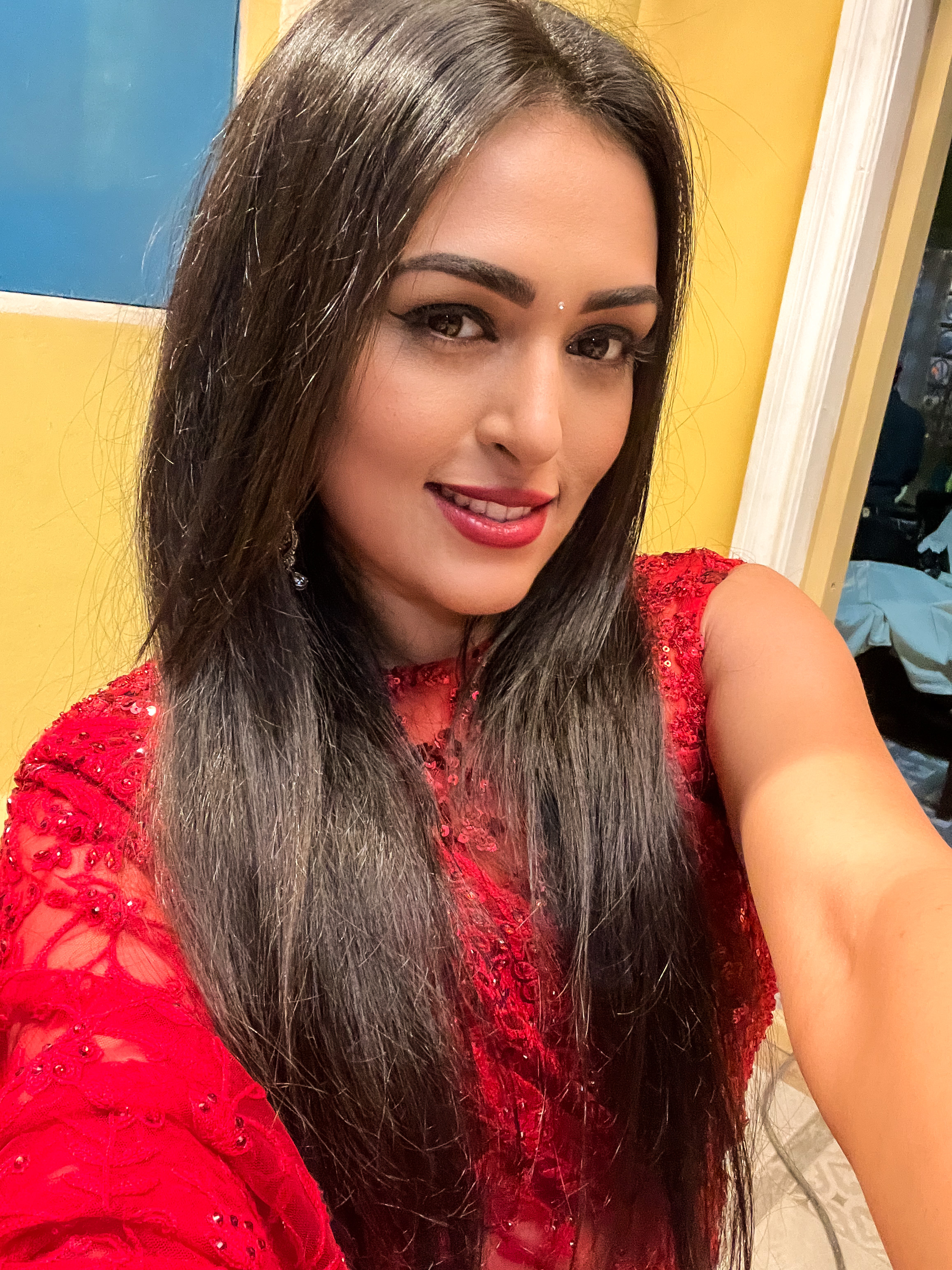
- Chandrapal in 2023
- Born: Ahmedabad, Gujarat
- Occupation: Actress
- Years active: 2013–present
- Known for: Suhani Si Ek Ladki

Sonu Chandrapal is an Indian television actress. She made her acting debut with Tujh Sang Preet Lagai Sajna portraying Nisha in 2013. Chandrapal is best known for her role as Ragini Saurabh Birla in Suhani Si Ek Ladkiand Goddess Saraswati in Shrimad Bhagwat Mahapuran. She had previously acted in Gujarati and South Indian films.

She was born in Ahmedabad, Gujarat and currently stays in Mumbai.

== Filmography ==
=== Television ===
Year	Role	Ref.
2013	Nisha	
2013	Billo	
2014–2015	Ragini Saurabh Birla	
2015	Vasudha	
2019	Goddess Saraswati	
2023	Chandni	

=== Films ===
- Wassup zindagi Gujarati film (2017) as Shama
- 12 Gaun (2024) – Nepali film
