= Srijana Subba =

Nepali film actress

Srijana Subba (Nepali: सृजना सुब्बा) is a Nepalese film actress. She has appeared in Loot (2012), Kabaddi Kabaddi (2015), Dying Candle (2016), and Loot 2 (2017).

== Personal life ==
Subba is married to Padam Subba and they have one child.

== Filmography ==
Year	Film	Role	Notes	Ref(s)
2012	Loot	Putali		
2016	Dying Candle	Kshemi		
2016	Yuma	Yuma	Stage; also Subba directed the play	
2017	Loot 2	Putali		
2018	Chakkar	Sheila		
2018	Mr. Virgin			
2025	Anjila	Anjila's mother		

== Awards and nominations ==
Year	Award	Nominated work	Category	Result	Ref(s)
2017	National Film Awards	Dying Candle	Best Actress	Won	
2018	Kamana Film Awards	Dying Candle	Best Actress	Won	
