= Tsering Rhitar Sherpa =

Nepalese film director

- Born: 1968 (age 57–58); Nepal
- Education: Delhi University, Jamia Millia Islamia
- Occupations: Filmmaker, screenwriter, and film producer
- Years active: 1994–present

Tsering Rhitar Sherpa (born 1968) is a Nepalese filmmaker, screenwriter, and film producer. His first film, Mukundo: Mask of Desire, was Nepal's official entry for the Oscars.

== Early life and education ==
Sherpa was born in Nepal "to a Nepalese Sherpa father and a Tibetan origin mother." After completing his Bachelor's degree at Delhi University, he studied filmmaking at Jamia Millia Islamia in Delhi from 1992 to 1993.

== Career ==
After completing his education, Sherpa made various documentary films, including Tears of Torture in 1994, a 27 minute documentary about a Tibetan nun traveling through the Himalayan mountain passes to escape Tibet.

In 1997, he made The Spirit Doesn't Come Anymore, a documentary film profiling an old Tibetan shaman and his difficult relationship with his son, who would not continue the family vocation. This film earned him the Best Film Award at Film South Asia, 1997 (Festival of South Asian Documentary Films) held in Kathmandu, Nepal, and Best Indigenous Filmmaker of the Year at the Parnu Anthropological Film Festival in Estonia in 1998. This film was also shown at the Leipzig Dokfestival in Germany, Cinema du Reel in France, Hong Kong International Film Festival, Hong Kong, Telluride Mountain Film Festival in the USA, Fukuoka International Film Festival (Focus On Asia) and Yamagata International Film Festival in Japan.

Tsering Rhitar Sherpa's first feature film was Mukundo: Mask of Desire, in 2000. The screenplay arose from a newspaper article about a traditional woman healer who had killed a female a woman patient during her healing. "Mukundo is, in the filmmaker's own words, 'an expression and exploration of confusion caused by rituals and beliefs prevalent in the Nepali society.'" In 2000 Mukundo: Mask of Desire was selected by the Oscar committee in Nepal to represent Nepal in the “Best Foreign Film” category.

In 2005-2006, Tsering Rhitar Sherpa made his second feature film, Karma, about two Buddhist nuns’ journey from the Mustang region. The film was shown at the San Francisco International Film Festival, Fukuoka International Film Festival (Japan), Tokyo International Film Festival, Vancouver International Film Festival (Canada), Goteberg International Film Festival (Sweden) and Fribourg International Film Festival (Switzerland).

Tsering Rhitar Sherpa continues to make documentary and feature films with the production company Mila Productions.

== Personal life ==
Sherpa is married and has a son (born 1995) and a daughter (born 2002).

== Films ==
- "Tears of Torture" (1994)
- "The Spirit Doesn't Come Anymore" (1997)
- Mukudo: Mask of Desire (2000)
- Karma (2006)
- Uma (2013)
- Singha Durbar (TV series) (2015)
- Kalo Pothi: The Black Hen (Producer)
- Seto Surya: White Sun (Producer)
