= Subarnapur, Nepal =

Subarnapur सुवर्णपुर
- Village development committee
- Location in Nepal
- Coordinates: 27.23°N 84.72°E
- Country: Nepal
- Zone: Narayani Zone
- District: Parsa District

Population (2011)
  - Total: 3,452
- Time zone: UTC+5:45 (Nepal Time)

Subarnapur is a village development committee in Parsa District in the Narayani Zone of southern Nepal. At the time of the 2011 Nepal census it had a population of 3,452 people living in 774 individual households. There were 1,582 males and 1,870 females at the time of census.
