= Geekshow Podcast =

Pop culture podcast

- Genre: Pop culture
- Language: American English

Cast and voices
- Hosted by: Kerry Jackson; Leigh George Kade; Shannon Barnson; Jimmy Martin; Jay Whittaker; Tony Eccles; Rebecca Frost

Production
- Length: 60-90 Minutes

Publication
- No. of seasons: 1
- No. of episodes: 910
- Original release: September 7, 2008
- Provider: Broadway Media
- Updates: Weekly

Related
- Website: www.geekshowpodcast.com

Geekshow Podcast is a weekly conversational podcast about popular culture produced by Broadway Media.

== Background ==
The show began in 1998 as a segment in the Radio From Hell program hosted by Kerry Jackson. The show includes discussions focused on movies, comics, TV shows, and games. The show is hosted in Kerry Jackson's basement. The hosts of the show are friends so the format of the show is conversational. Jeff Vice, a host of the show and a journalist for Deseret News, died in 2014 at the age of 48 due to an asthma attack.

== Reception ==
The show won "Best podcast" from 2009 until 2015 in the Salt Lake City Weekly awards. The show later won second place for "Best Local Podcast" in the 2020 Salt Lake City Weekly awards. The Geek Show was included in the illustration of a Harley Quinn comic.
