= Nima Rumba =

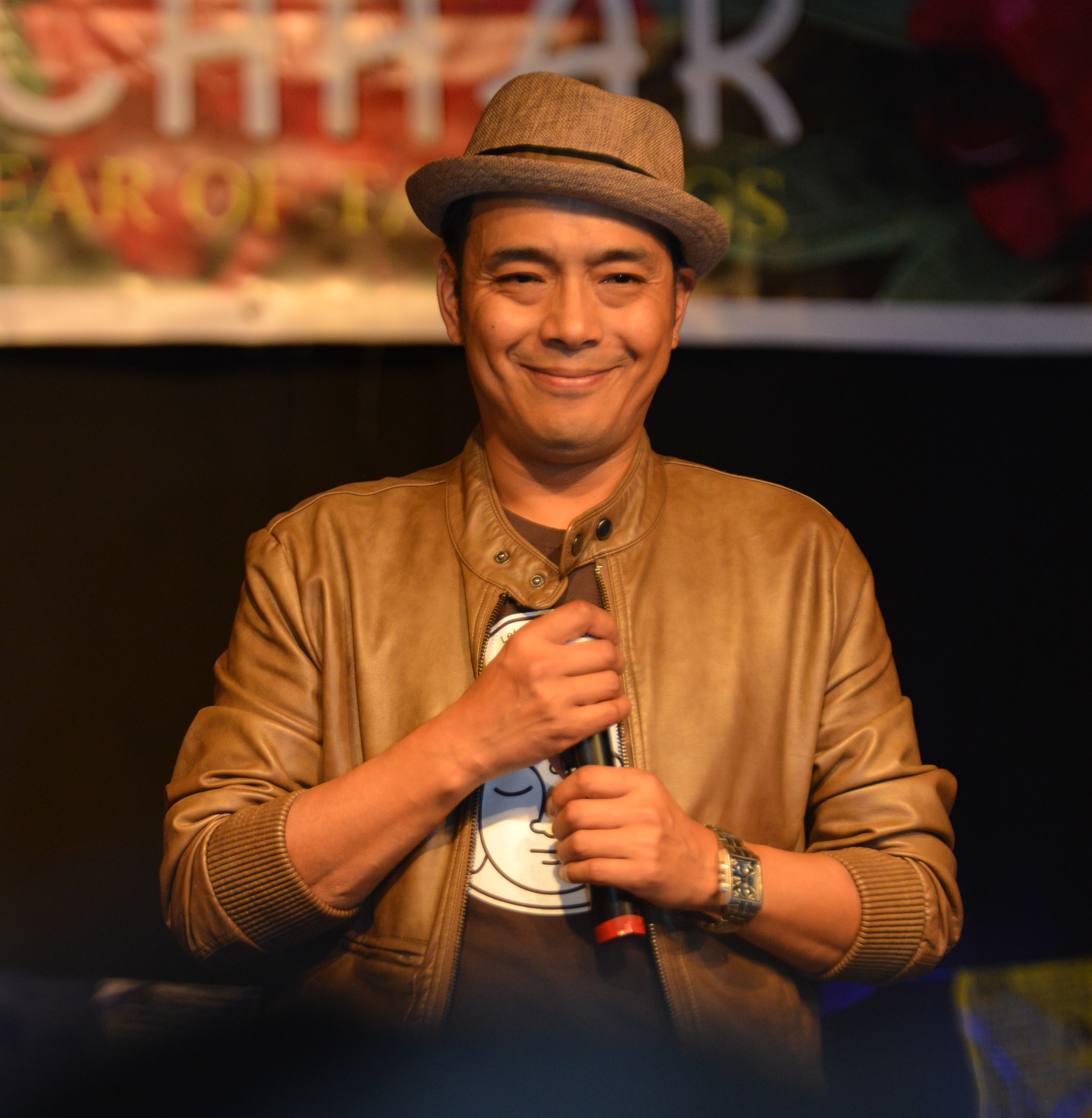
- Rumba performing in Tamang Sonam Lochhar programme in Washington, D.C. (2018)

Background information
- Born: Nima Chhiring Lama; 27 May 1974 (age 52); Subarnapur, Parsa, Nepal
- Genres: Pop
- Occupations: Singer, musician, actor
- Years active: 1991–present
- Website: http://www.nimarumba.com

Nima Rumba is a singer, lyricist, musician, and actor from Nepal. Some of his popular songs are Block Heel, Huri Bataas, Samjhera Ti din Haru, Aau Aauna, and Preeti Basyo.

== Personal life ==
Nima was born in Subarnapur, Parsa of Nepal. His family migrated to Parsa from Mudhe, Sindhupalchok before he was born. He is married to Sheli Thapa Magar. The couple have two children.

== Discography ==
Albums

- Suna Suna (1994)
- Memories (1996)
- Huri Batas (2000)
- Lolita (2002)
- Faith (2004)
- Pride (2006)
- Rangau Ki Ma (2011)
- Best of Nima Rumba (2002).

== Films ==
- Kagbeni (2008)
- VISA GIRL
- Ma
- Tshering (2019)

Most loved song: Priti Basyo
