= Rick McFarland =

American film executive (born 1970)

Rick McFarland (born July 1970) is an American film executive who served as executive producer at Cosmic Pictures and has been owner of fiftyfilms llc since July 2006.

== Early life ==
McFarland was born in the city of Whittier, 12 miles southeast of Los Angeles. He spent his early years in Southern California and moved to Utah at the age of 10. While still in high school, he obtained his commercial pilot's license. McFarland graduated from Brigham Young University in 1996 with a BA in music.

== Music career ==
McFarland was a member of Vocal Point from 1991 to 1994 as a baritone.

== Film career ==
McFarland worked his way through college as a freelance producer, sound designer, and editor, participating on such documentaries as Out of the Ashes, Immortal Fortress: A Look Inside Chechnya's Warrior Culture, and Roots & Wings. During his freelance years he developed a specialty in language replacement pieces for various companies and produced, and also scored Truth and Conviction, a PBS documentary film about a young boy who defied the Nazis during World War II. As a part of that experience, McFarland was able to interview Nobel Prize winner Günter Grass about his thoughts on Helmut Huebner. Truth and Conviction has now inspired additional research, books, and even a feature-length screenplay on his life.

In 2003 he came to Cosmic Pictures in Salt Lake City where he produced hundreds of broadcast and noncommercial pieces and Stalking Santa, a feature-length film narrated by William Shatner. He also wrote a number of commercial scripts and feature screenplays. He founded his own company, Fiftyfilms, in 2006 where he has continued his prodigious commercial work with clients such as Intel, Verizon, BAE Systems, Purina, Sabick, and Microsoft. McFarland produced and edited My Girlfriend's Boyfriend starring Alyssa Milano, Christopher Gorham, and Michael Landes in 2009.

Because of his love of flying, McFarland has developed a particular expertise in aerial photography. He has also enjoyed traveling everywhere from Germany to Australia and Costa Rica to Guam. For his latest screenplay, McFarland took a research trip to Kathmandu in 2011. He found a country which was both absolutely foreign and strangely similar to his home state of Utah. Once the script was finished, casting and filming began in 2012. Highway to Dhampus was the first independent feature film shot entirely in Nepal by a foreign director and crew. It is also a deeply personal film for McFarland, drawing much from his own experiences and transposing them into a Nepali setting.
