= Biraj Bhatta =

Nepali actor (born 1971)

Biraj Bhatt
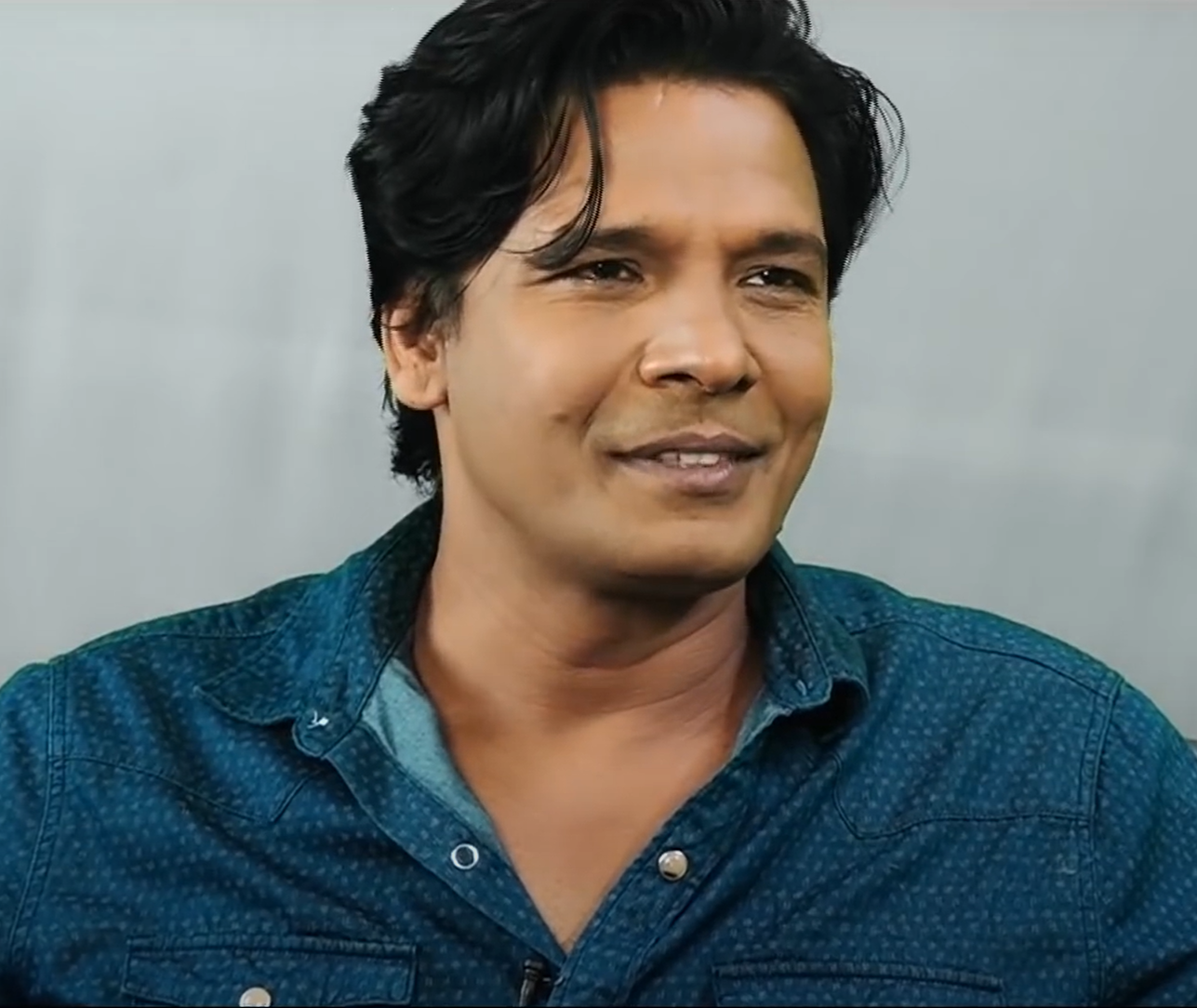
- Bhatta in 2017
- Born: Bhojraj Bhatta (भोजराज भट्ट); May 13, 1971 (age 55); Dhangadhi, Nepal
- Occupations: Actor, film director, film producer
- Years active: 2000–present
- Spouse: Saraswati Bhatta
- Children: 2 (incl. Samir Bhatt)

Biraj Bhatta, also known as Biraj Bhatt (Nepali: विराज भट्), is a Nepalese actor, director and film producer known for his works in Nepali cinema and Bhojpuri cinema. Widely known in media as Action Star or Action Tiger of Nepali Cinema, he is known for his socio-drama action movies and is considered one of the most successful actor in Nepali cinema history and one of the few actor to have successful career in foreign film industry, Bhojpuri. He has starred in more than 200 movies through different languages like Nepali, Bhojpuri & Tharu. He received National Film award for Best actor for Nepali movie Khal Nayak (2008).

Bhatta began his acting career in the early 2000s, gaining prominence with his performances in Nepali films such as Dewar Babu (2008) and Khal Nayak (2008), the latter earning him the National Film Award for Best Actor. His transition into Bhojpuri cinema further elevated his status, with notable roles in films like Dabang Sarkar, Dulha Albela, and Jigarwala.

In addition to acting, Bhatta has ventured into directing and producing, with projects like Sanglo (2020) and 12 Gaun (2024), with the latter being among the highest grossing Nepali movies of all time.

== Acting career ==
=== 2002–2007 Debut and early work ===
Biraj Bhatt first film credit was a supporting role in Khukuri which did well at the box office. He also appeared in supporting roles in films like Unko Samjhana Ma(2001) and Pauju(2002). He also made a cameo appearance in the action comedy film Raju Raja Ram(2005). He starred in the Tharu language film Abhagan Suhaagan(2005) and co-starred in Nepali films like Agnipath (2004), Durga (2005), Maidan(2005), Jeevan Daata (2005), Hami Taxi Driver (2006) and Dadagiri(2007). after the successful of his early movies he was appreciated by critics for his dance & Action.

=== 2008–2011 Stardom, success, and break from Nepali film industry ) ===
He starred in the lead role in Himmat, Kismat, KhalNayak, Sisila, Agni Jwala, Ilaka, Itihaas, Taqdeer, Arjun Dev, Dosti, Naina Resham, Giraftar, Himmat 2, Dhoom, Sapoot, Naya Nepal, Darr and many more. In a short time he appeared in more than 76 successful movies from 2000 to 2011. He became a star in Bhojpuri cinema after his successful debut in movie Lagal Raha Yeh Raja Ji(2008).His last release of a Nepali movie was Migra Trishana (2011) which starred Nandita K.C. and was directed by Tulsi Ghimire. Following the release of Migra Trishana his only Bhojpuri-dubbed movies released with five-year gaps were Karja Ragat Ko, Kundali, Gunda, Kartoos, Mard, Jungbhoomi, Shooter, Pratikar & Damini—all were commercial failures.

=== 2012–2015 Stardom In Bhojpuri ===
He starred in his first Bhojpuri Movie Lagal Raha Yeh Raja Ji (2007). He starred in Bhojpuri movies such as Mard Tangewala (2009), Hum Hai Hero Hindustani (2009), Mard Rikshawala (2010), Jaanwar (2012), Panchayat, Mahabharat, Durga, Rang, Gunday, Trishul, Shooter, Damini, Son of Bihar, Jungle Raaz, Hitler, Janeman, Lohe Ki Zanjeer, Daag, Bhaagi, Kartoos and others. He is called a " He Man" of Bhojpuri cinema. He appeared in more than 80 Bhojpuri movies in 5 years.

=== 2016 Comeback to Nepali film, and slump) ===
In 2016 he was in the action film Jai Parshuram. Although the film was a commercial failure, his performance in this movie was highly appreciated especially in its action part. He committed to star in the film Harke Raja but it was not made.

=== 2019–present Sanglo and 12 Gaun success ===
In 2019, Biraj Bhatt returned to Nepali cinema starring in Sanglo, in which he directed and acted opposite Nikita Chandak. The film was average success at the box office. Next, he acted and directed action drama film 12 Gaun which also marked the debut of his eldest son Samir Bhatt. Released with target of gaining advantage of Dashain Holiday, it met with mixed review from critics but received positive feedback from audience and became huge blockbuster at the box office and one of the highest-grossing films in Nepal.

== Stage performance ==
Biraj Bhatt has also performed on Bhojpuri and Nepali shows in Qatar.

== Filmography ==
Key
†	Denotes films that have not yet been released
‡	Indicates documentary release

Some Notable Movies
Year	Language	Title	Role(s)	Notes	Ref(s)
2003	Nepali	Khukri	Inspector	Debut film	
2005	Tharu	Abhagan Suhagan			
2005	Nepali	Agnipath			
2005	Nepali	Raju Raja Ram	KarnaMan Singh Basnet	Special appearance	
2006	Nepali	Hami Taxi Driver			
2006	Nepali	Jeevandata			
2007	Nepali	Don			
2007	Nepali	Agni Jwala	Jwala		
2007	Nepali	Himmat			
2008	Nepali	Sahara			
2008	Nepali	Khalnayak	Deva	Won National Award for Best Actor	
2008	Nepali	Giraftar			
2008	Nepali	Naseeb Aafno			
2008	Nepali	Dewar Babu	Lucky		
2008	Nepali	Dar			
2008	Bhojpuri	Lagal Raha Ae Rajaji			
2009	Nepali	Batuli	Abhay		
2009	Bhojpuri	Deewana			
2009	Bhojpuri	Hum Hai Hero Hindustani			
2010	Nepali	Maidan	Inspector Himal		
2010	Nepali	Timi Bina Ko Jiwan	Samir/Pandu		
2010	Nepali	Prahaar	Inspector Surya		
2011	Nepali	Itihaas	Babu Raja		
2011	Nepali	Na Birse TImilai Na Paye Timilai			
2011	Nepali	Birata Ko Chino	Aakash		
2011	Nepali	Mriga Trishna	Dev		
2011	Nepali	Nigarani			
2011	Bhojpuri	Piyawa Bada Satawela			
2012	Nepali	Naina Resham	Biraj/Resham		
2012	Nepali	Bhagi Bhagi Najau	Aakash		
2012	Bhojpuri	Khudda			
2012	Bhojpuri	Jaan Tere Naam			
2013	Nepali	Damini			
2013	Nepali	Aljhechha Kyare Pachheuri			
2013	Nepali	Karja Ragat Ko			
2013	Nepali	Zanjeer			
2013	Bhojpuri	Himmatwala			
2014	Nepali	Jwala			
2015	Bhojpuri	Laagi Tohse Lagan			
2016	Nepali	Jai Parshuram	DSP Parshuram Bikram Thapa		
2017	Bhojpuri	Gunday	Ranjeet		
2020	Nepali	Sanglo	Saral	Debut as director and producer	
2023	Bhojpuri	Vadh	Shiv Singh		
2024	Nepali	12 Gaun*	Arjun	Also director and producer	
2026	Nepali	Ram Naam Satya*		Also producer	

== Awards and nominations ==
Year	Award	Category	Nominated work	Result	Ref(s)
2008	National Award	Best Actor	Khalnayak	Won	
2020	D Cine Award	Best Debut Director	Sanglo	Won	

== Biraj Bhatt Film Production ==
- List of films

1. Sanglo

2. 12 Gaun

== See also ==
- List of Nepalese actors
