= Arpan Thapa =

Nepali actor, director, and scriptwriter

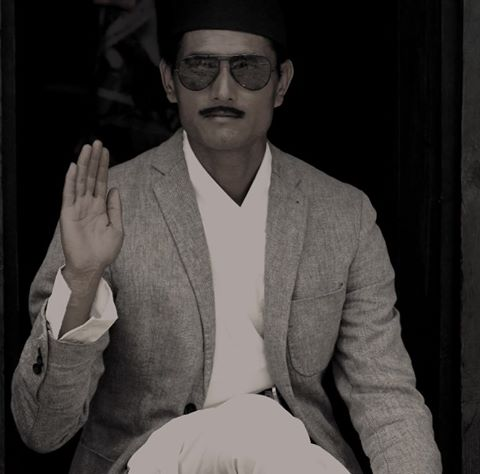
- Thapa in 2015, during the filming of Bir Bikram
- Born: 15 November 1978 (age 47); Kathmandu, Nepal
- Occupations: Actor, director, writer
- Years active: 2007–present
- Height: 1.80 m (5 ft 11 in)

Arpan Thapa (Nepali: अर्पण थापा) (born 15 November 1978) is a Nepalese actor, director, and scriptwriter.

He studied acting in Mumbai in 2002 before returning to Nepal to start his career in the Nepali film industry. He sold CDs at Mahabouddha, to promote the business of a friend, where he met Murray Kerr, the director.

Thapa began his acting career with the Nepali film Sick City, playing the lead role as Krishna. He has directed the movie Mukhauta, which was released on 13 June 2014.

Thapa cites Daniel Day-Lewis as his inspiration and has expressed respect for other Nepalese actors, including Hari Bansha Acharya and Madan Krishna Shrestha.

== Filmography ==
Year	Film	Role	Notes	Ref(s)
2011	Sick City	Krishna		
2011	Batch No: 16	Guru		
2012	Dhanda	Arjun		
2013	Chhadke	Bhokse		
2013	Badhshala	Captain Thapa		
2013	Maun	Aman		
2014	Mukhauta	Pandit		
2014	Suntali	Tailor		
2015	Dying Candle	Mukunda		
2016	Bir Bikram	Aaitey		
2016	Bato Muni ko Phool 2	Abhay		
2016	Hamlet	Hamlet		
2016	Anaagat	Suresh		
2017	America boys			
2017	Lappan Chhappan	Chamero Don		
2018	Changa Chet			
2018	Firke			
2019	Ghar	Shiva	Also writer and director.	
2020	Teen Jantu	Maila		
2022	Chiso Manchhe			
2023	Prasad 2			
2023	Dimag Kharab			
2024	Chitra			
2024	Rangeli			
2025	Laaj Saranam			
2025	Reemai			
2025	Balidan			
2026	The Blue Light			

== Director ==
He has directed several films; Mukhauta in 2014, a drama Aadha Love in 2017, Sunkesari, Ghar in 2019, and the upcoming Teen Jantu in 2020.
