= Bhusan Dahal =

Nepalese television personality

- Born: May 18, 1966 (age 59); Kathmandu, Nepal
- Occupations: Media personality, film director
- Years active: 1988-present
- Known for: His television career and Kagbeni, his debut film

Tara Bhusan Dahal (born May 18, 1966) is a Nepali television personality, music video director, film director, and media personality based in Nepal. He has been active in the Nepali television industry since 1988. He is most noted for his contribution to the Nepali television and video industry, and is also well-known for his movie Kagbeni, where he made his directorial debut after making notable music videos, documentaries, and features.

Dahal has directed several music videos for popular Nepali singers.

During 1988-1990, he anchored *Sunday Pop*, a program of international pop music on Nepal Television (NTV). He initiated *Disha Nirdesh*, a political program run on NTV anchored by Bijay Kumar, and hosted *Fireside*, a current affairs talk show on Kantipur Television, from 2003-2019.

Dahal served Nepal Television as a beginner and worked at the Image Channel for three years. He was the executive director for Dibyadristi, his own television production venture in Nepal, before joining Kantipur Television as the chief executive producer. His latest show, *The Bravo Delta Show*, appears on the HIMALAYA TV.
