= List of Nepalese films of 2019 =

This is a list of Nepalese films that were scheduled to be released in 2019.

== January – March ==
Opening		Title	Director	Cast	Genre	Studio (s)	Ref.
J A N	4	Jay Shree Daam	Biplop Upreti	Amrit Dhungana, Binod Neupane, Pramod Agrahari, Jebicca Karki	Drama	National Media Production, Monkey Temple Production, Crazy Hands Production	
J A N	4	Je Sukai Hos	Umesh Gurung, Roshan Shrestha	Chanda Dahal, Sunil Katuwal, Umesh Gurung	Drama	Quality Films	
J A N	11	Chauka Dau	Purnendu Kumar Jha	Barsha Raut, Wilson Bikram Rai, Rabindra Jha, Santosh Panta	Comedy	Shaurya Productions	
J A N	11	Villain	Devendra Panday	Nikhil Upreti, Shilpa Pokhrel, Nisha Adhikari, Kapil Khatri	Action	The Global Pictures	
J A N	18	Garud Puran	Subash Koirala	Karma Shakya, Najir Hussain, Prakash Ghimire	Comedy	Ajit Films	
J A N	25	Aarop	Amar Oli	Kishor Khatiwada, Sanchita Luitel, Rajan Gahatraj	Action	Dilasha Creation Production	
J A N	25	Baina	Dil Prakash Yakso	Ranjita Limbu, Subash Meche, Surbir Pandit, Uday Subba	Romance	Lingden Films	
J A N	25	Anaagat	Samten Bhutia	Priyanka Karki, Arpan Thapa, Praween Khatiwada	Thriller	Mountain River Films	
F E B	3	100 Kada 10	Ram Sharan Pathak	Amrit Dhungana, Karuna Shrestha, Manoj Gajurel	Comedy Drama	Darshan Nepal Creation	
F E B	3	Gopi	Dipendra Lama	Bipin Karki, Barsha Raut, Surakshya Panta, Ankeet Khadka	Drama	Aarohi Entertainment	
F E B	3	Ranveer	Govind Singh Bhandari	Sushil Sitaula, Subeksha Khadka, Supushpa Bhatta, Prashant Tamrakar	Action	DR Films, Prachi Films Presents	
F E B	8	Summer Love	Muskan Dhakal	Ashish Piya, Rewati Chetri, Suraj Singh Thakuri, Namrata Sapkota	Romance	Nightingale Entertainment	
F E B	15	Bulbul	Binod Paudel	Swastima Khadka, Mukun Bhusal, Joes Pandey	Romance Comedy	Awaken Production	
F E B	15	Jadugar −2	Mahadev Tripathi	Mahadev Tripathi, Surendra K.C., Shiva Shankar Rijal, Resham Firiri	Comedy	Yak Entertainment	
F E B	22	Rumalai Chha Chino	Dinesh Singh Thakuri	Sushant Karki, Kishor Khatiwada, Sanchita Luitel, Rashmi Bhatta, Mithila Sharma	Action	Jyoti Films	
F E B	22	Boyfriend	Madan Ghimire	Mahima Silwal, Puskar Regmi, Saroj Khanal, Mohan Niraula	Romance	Budhathoki Films	
F E B	22	Fingerprint	Nabin Niraula	Aayushma Karki, Deepak Tripathi, Sarita Lamichhane, Ramesh Budhathoki	Drama	Kamana Films	
M A R	1	Captain	Diwakar Bhattarai	Anmol K.C., Sunil Thapa, Saroj Khanal, Prashant Tamrakar, Wilson Bikram Rai	Sport Drama	Super Kajal Films	
M A R	1	The Break Up	Hem Raj B.C.	Aashirman DS Joshi, Shilpa Maskey, Raymon Das Shrestha, Itchya Karki, Saroj Khanal	Romance	BC Motion Pictures	
M A R	8	Khaag	Manoj Pandit	Prabin Khatiwada, Puskar Gurung, Aashant Sharma, Srijana Adhikari	Social Drama	SRF	
M A R	8	Adalat	Dinesh Lingden	Sushma Karki	Drama	Libang Films Production	
M A R	15	The Man from Kathmandu	Pema Dhondup	Gulshan Grover, Hameed Sheikh, Anna Sharma, Karma Shakya, Neer Shah, Mithila Sharma, Paramita RL Rana	Action	TriCity Pictures	
M A R	15	Jani Najani	Basanta Adhikari	Manish Shrestha, Sumi Moktan, Nirisha Basnet, Sunny Singh, Roshani K.C.	Romance	Roshani Entertainments	
M A R	22	Kagaz Patra	Apil Bista	Najir Hussain, Shilpa Maskey, Laxmi Bardewa, Sarita Giri, Bholaraj Sapkota	Comedy Drama	EP Education Australia	
M A R	29	Saili	Ram Babu Gurung	Gaurav Pahari, Menuka Pradhan, Dayahang Rai, Maotse Gurung, Prakash Ghimire, Aruna Karki	Romance	GH Entertainment	

== April – June ==
Opening		Title	Director	Cast	Genre	Studio (s)	Ref.
A P R	5	Love Station	Ujwal Ghimire	Pradeep Khadka, Jassita Gurung, Ramesh Budhathoki, Binod Paudel, Saroj Khanal	Romance	Kafiya Films	
A P R	5	Premnath	Ganesh Belbase	Gajit Bista, Surbir Pandit, Ganesh Belbase, Kamal Gaule	Action	G5 Films	
A P R	5	Jiwan Kanda Ki Phool	Binod Bista	Sarika Ghimire, Rojita Buddhacharya	biographical film	Bista Brother Films	
A P R	12	Yatra: A Musical Vlog	Samrat Shakya	Salin Man Bania, Salon Basnet, Jahanwi Basnet, Prakash Adhikari, Dhiren Shakya	Musical	KKD Films, Hari Om Cinemakers, Creative Movie Production	
A P R	12	A Mero Hajur 3	Jharana Thapa	Anmol K.C., Suhana Thapa, Arpan Thapa	Romance	Suhana Entertainment, Sunil Kumar Thapa Production	
M A Y	17	Jatrai Jatra	Pradeep Bhattarai	Bipin Karki, Dayahang Rai, Rabindra Singh Baniya, Nischal Basnet	Comedy	Shatkon Arts	
M A Y	26	Daal Bhat Tarkari	Sudan K.C.	Hari Bansha Acharya, Madan Krishna Shrestha, Wilson Bikram Rai, Niruta Singh	Comedy	MaHa Sanchar	

== July–September ==
Opening	Title	Director	Cast	Genre	Studio (s)	Box office	Ref.
15 August	Hajar Juni Samma						
13 September	Password		Anoop Bikram Shahi, Sunny Leone (Item song)	Thriller film			
20 September	Kabaddi Kabaddi Kabaddi	Ram Babu Gurung	Dayahang Rai Upasana Singh Thakuri Rishma Gurung Karma Shakya Wilson Bikram Rai Buddhi Tamang Bijay Baral Puskar Gurung Kabita Ale Maotse Gurung				

== October–December ==
Release date	Film	Cast	Director	Producer	Music composer	Editor/Vfx Artist
December 6, 2019	Maya Pirim	Salon Basnet, Anjali Adhikari, Koshish Chhetri	Tek Paurakhi Rai	Pravin Thapa, Sabin Adhikari	Koshish Chhetri	

== See also ==
- List of Nepalese films of 2001
- List of Nepalese films of 2002
- List of Nepalese films of 2016
- List of Nepalese films of 2017
- Highest-Grossing Nepali films
- List of highest-grossing Nepali films
