= Rabindra Singh Baniya =

Nepalese film actor and producer

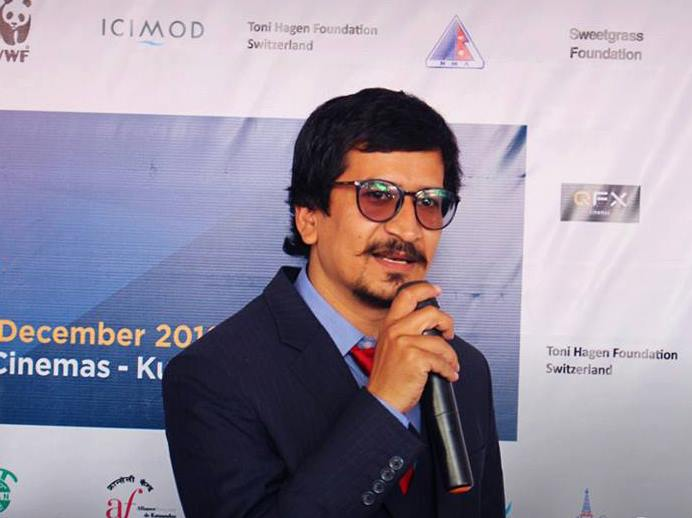
- Born: February 14, 1982 (age 44)
- Occupation: Actor/Producer
- Notable work: Jatra (2016 film) (Executive Producer, Role play as Joyas,), Jatrai Jatra (Executive Producer/Actor, Role play as Joyas,), Pashupati Prasad (Role play as 'Hanuman Ji'), Talakjung Vs Tulke(2014), (Executive Producer/Actor, Role play as a 'Binay Babu Shaheb'), White Sun (Role play as Suraj); Jhumkee; Looking for a Lady With Fangs and a Moustache(Role play as Rabindra); Mahapurush (2022 film) (Role play as a Bidur ); Rabindra); Mahajatra(2024 film)(Executive Producer/Actor) Role play as a Joyes ) Lalibazar(2026 film)(Producer/Actor) Role play as a Shamsher RajaSaap)
- Spouse: Sita Shrestha
- Children: Samyak Singh Baniya (Son) Sambodhi Baniya(Daughter)
- Parents: Laxman Baniya (father); Kamala Baniya (mother)
- Website: www.rabindrabaniya.com

Rabindra Singh Baniya is a Nepali Actor, Producer and Theatre Actor/Director. Prior to entering into Nepali cinema industry, he was highly involved in stage dramas. He is popularly known as "Hanuman Ji" "हनुमान जी" (Hindu God) for his role in a hit Nepali movie, Pashupati Prasad (2016), which brought him into the limelight of the Nepali movie industry. He is actively involved in Nepali Film industry as an Actor and producer. His works are Talakjung Vs Tulke(Executive Producer/Actor) (2014), Jatra (2016 film)(Executive Producer/Actor)(2016) and White Sun(Actor) (2016). Jhumkee(2016), Jatrai Jatra(Executive Producer/Actor) (2019), Looking for a Lady With Fangs and a Moustache(Producer/Actor)(2019), Mahapurush (2022 film) (Executive Producer/Actor), Mahajatra(2024 film)(Executive Producer/Actor)

== Education ==
Rabindra Singh Baniya was born in Dhading, Nepal. He passed his P.C.L from Shaheed Smriti Campus, Chitwan, and completed his B.A. in Sociology from Tri-Chandra College, Kathmandu.

== Career ==
Rabindra Singh Baniya first started out as a theater artist, where he was involved in the roleplays and direction of various theatrical plays. He started his film career with Talakjung Vs Tulke (2014), where he was the executive producer, and also performed a role in the movie. Till date, he was worked in five Nepalese films.

== Film career, debut and turning point and other works ==
=== Early career ===
Rabindra Singh Baniya was clear of his goal at a young age and started working as an actor since then. He took various training and workshops on acting and different aspects of film-making. He continued his passion by performing in various theater plays. He has been active in Nepali theater for the last 17 years. He has directed various dramas during his career as a theater artist.

=== Film appearances ===
Baniya made a debut in 2014 with Talakjung Vs Tulke, where he played a role as Binaya Babu Saheb. His turning point was his role play as Hanuman Ji on Pashupati Prasad (2016), where he was able to garner positive reviews for his performance. He then played a role as Joyes in a comedy movie, Jatra(2016), which steered him to success as a film actor. His latest movie, White Sun Seto Surya (2016) directed by Deepak Rauniyar, was very popular and was a winner of Best Asian Feature Film Award at Singapore International Film Festival 2016. He also starred in Seto Surya.

He is the actor/director at Shatkon Arts, which was one of the production companies of hit Nepali films like Talakjung Vs Tulke (2014) and Jatra (2016). He also worked as a Radio Drama Producer of 'Katha Mitho Sarangiko' at BBC Media Action for 2 years.

=== Other works ===
Besides Nepali cinema, Baniya is also highly active in various other works. He is involved in organic farming, as the owner of Green Gold Farm House, where he does organic farming. He is President at Miteree Foundation Nepal(मितेरी फाउन्डेशन) since 2010 where he does volunteer and social works.

== Theater Role Plays ==
In his career, he has performed in many theatre plays as well. In 2008, Baniya was in Ghanchakkar which was performed at the 10th Bharat Rangmahotsav in National School of Drama, Delhi and was directed by Baniya's Guru, Sunil Pokharel (Principle of Gurukul: school of theatre). He continued to act in other plays like Dream of Maya Devi which was presented to a large audience at the Deso Bideso Natya Mela, Baharampur, India in the same year. He was an actor in the stage drama Tara Baji Lai Lai directed by Morton Crog from Norway. He collaborated time and again with Sunil Pokharel as he took on many parts like Henerik Isban in Master Builder, Dr Knock in Jhul Roma and Aavi Subedi in Aagni ko katha. He played a part in the Anup Baral directed play Jaat Sodhnu Jogiko.

He has portrayed many characters in plays like Aastha Ko Mandir, Etihash Aba Lekhinchha, Dosh Kasai ko Chaiina, Bhoko Ghar, Hareyeko Patra, Tyo ghar, New Nepal, Ek Raat and Jananta ki Dusman.

He showed even more acting prowess by acting in street plays titled Prajatantra (2056), Janata ko Prajantatra, Ujayalo Bhabishya and Hosiyar. He has continuously worked in dramas and plays that portray and shed light on the underbelly of society. He did this in his street drama For New Nepal. He then took up a project that would teach society about environmental awareness. The drama was named For Green New Nepal. He is a believer that social evils should be uprooted from society. He has continuously played in more than 25 Dramas in at least 200 places all over Nepal about social issues.

He has acted in the popular Nepali television serial Jeevan Chakra.

== Association with other artists ==
Baniya in his career has worked with many actors and actresses. Some of them are as follows:

- Khagendra Lamichhane in Talakjung vs Tulke (2014) and Pashupati Parsad (2016)
- Nischal Basnet in Talakjung vs Tulke (2014)
- Reecha Sharma in Talakjung vs Tulke (2014)
- Sushank Mainali in Talajung vs Tulke (2014)
- Bipin Karki in Jatra (2016) and Pashupati Parsad (2016)
- Barsha Raut in Jatra (2016)
- Dayahang Rai in Talajung vs Tulke (2014) and White Sun (2016)
