= List of Nepalese films of 2017 =

This is a list of Nepalese films that were scheduled to be released in 2017.

== Key ==
Key
†	Denotes films that have not yet been released
*	Denotes films still running in theatres
*	Denotes films indicates highest grossing movies of the year

== Releases ==
=== January ===
Release date (A.D)	Release date (B.S)	Film	Genre	Director	Cast	Notes	Ref
January 6	Poush 22, 2073	Bhram	Love, Thriller	Rabindra Shahi	Karma, Bhintuna Joshi, Khusbu Khadka, Suresh Gamal	Running Time: 2 hrs	
January 12	Poush 28, 2073	Love Sasha	Romance	Prachanda M Shrestha	Karma, Keki Adhikari	Running Time: 1 hr 42 mins	
January 12	Poush 28, 2073	King	Action	Sabir Shrestha	Nikhil Upreti, Anoop Bikram Shahi, Benisha Hamal	Running Time: 2 hrs 15 mins	
January 13	Poush 29, 2073	Karkhana	Romance, Action	Amardeep Sapkota	Sushil Shrestha, Barsha Siwakoti, Mausami Malla, Amardeep Sapkota		

=== February ===
Release date (A.D)	Release date (B.S)	Film	Genre	Director	Cast	Notes	Ref
February 10	Magh 28, 2073	Lakeside	Love, Music	Raju Adhikari	Jiwan Luitel, Neeta Dhungana		
February 24	Falgun 13, 2073	Loot 2	Crime, Action, Thriller	Nischal Basnet	Saugat Malla, Karma, Dayahang Rai, Reecha Sharma, Bipin Karki, Kameshwor Chaurasiya, Srijana Subba	Nepali Blockbuster Movie	

=== March ===
Release date (A.D)	Release date (B.S)	Film	Genre	Director	Cast	Notes	Ref
March 24	Chaitra 11, 2073	Nirbhaya	Action	Madhusudan Bhattarai	Nikhil Upreti, Neeta Dhungana		
March 24	Chaitra 11, 2073	Lappan Chappan	Crime, Action, Comedy	Mukunda Bhatta	Dayahang Rai, Saugat Malla, Barsha Siwakoti, Arpan Thapa, Shyam Shrestha		
March 27	Chaitra 11, 2073	Diary	Love, Action	Anil Yonjan	Rekha Thapa, Chhulthim Gurung, Sunny Singh		

=== April ===
Release date (A.D)	Release date (B.S)	Film	Genre	Director	Cast	Notes	Ref
April 14	Baisakh 1, 2073	Radhe	Patritoic Drama	Jagadishwor Thapa	Nikhil Upreti, Priyanka Karki		
April 14	Baisakh 1, 2073	Ghampani	Romance	Dipendra Lama	Dayahang Rai, Keki Adhikari		
April 14	Baisakh 1, 2074	Love Love Love	Love	Dipendra K. Khanal	Suraj Pandey, Swastima Khadka		

=== June ===
Release date (A.D)	Release date (B.S)	Film	Genre	Director	Cast	Notes	Ref
June 9	Jestha 26, 2074	Lalteen	Action	Dev Kumar Shrestha	Dayahang Rai, Priyanka Karki, Keki Adhikari, Arjun Jung Shahi	Not released yet	

=== August ===
Release date (A.D)	Release date (B.S)	Film	Genre	Director	Cast	Notes	Ref
27 August 2017	Sunday, 2074/5/11	*Chhakka Panja 2	comedy-drama	Deepa Shree Niraula	Deepak Raj Giri Kedar Ghimire Priyanka Karki Jeetu Nepal Barsha Raut Buddhi Tamang Swastima Khadka Prem Pandey Swaroop Purush Dhakal		

=== December ===
Release date	Film	Cast	Director	Producer	Music composer	Editor/Vfx Artist	Notes
2017 Dec 1	Fikka	Ajay Sunar, Sharu Nepal,	Janak Khadka	Suchitra Shrestha, [,	Chetan Sapkota and Mak10 Kalu	Ananta Ghimire, Subodh Thapa	

== Upcoming Movies ==
=== May ===
Release date (A.D)	Release date (B.S)	Film	Genre	Director	Cast	Notes	Ref

== See also ==
- List of highest-grossing films in Nepal
- List of Nepalese films of 2016
- List of Nepalese films of 2018
- List of Nepalese films of 2019
- List of Nepalese films of 2020
- Highest-Grossing Nepali films
- List of highest-grossing Nepali films
