= Aarohan Gurukul =

Nepalese theatrical group

Aarohan Theatre Group
- Formation: 1982
- Founder: Sunil Pokharel, Badri Adhikari
- Type: Theatre group
- Location: Biratnagar, Kathmandu
- Artistic director: Sunil Pokharel
- Notable members: Satya Mohan Joshi; Abhi Subedi; Suman Pokhrel; Sanjeev Uprety; Sugam Pokharel; Keki Adhikari; Saugat Malla; Dayahang Rai; Khagendra Lamichhane; Namrata Shrestha; Bipin Karki

Aarohan Theatre Group (Nepali:आरोहण नाटक समूह) (commonly known as Aarohan Gurukul and also known as Aarohan Theatre, and Gurukul Theatre) is a theatre group in Nepal. It produces shows incorporating various cultures, religions and rituals of Nepal. The group has produced 15 TV shows for Nepal Television and produced various radio dramas. One of the radio drama was 136 episodes long. The group has performed its plays in India, China, Pakistan, Bangladesh, Russia, South Korea, Thailand, Norway, Denmark and United States. It has two theater halls in its Biratnagar premise.

== History ==
Aarohan Theatre Group was founded in 1982 by a group of theatre artists from Biratnagar and was registered with District Administration Office, Morang in Biratnagar. Later, it expanded its activities to Kathmandu and worked by getting a rented a place in Purano Baneswhor, Kathmandu.

Aarohan Theatre Group expanded its work to other locations and started Gurukul, Nepal’s first ever school of theatre, in Kathmandu in 2003. Since the establishment of Gurukul, Aarohan Theater Group has been calling as Aarohan Gurukul by public and media. Located at Old Baneshwar and run by theater director Sunil Pokharel, Arohan Gurukul became a common platform for theater artists of both professional and amateur stature. In a few years Gurukul managed to construct two theater halls: Sama Theatre and Rimal Theater named after the first generation modern Nepali playwrights Balkrishna Sama and Gopal Prasad Rimal.

It constructed another theater hall in 2010 at its Biratnagar premise and named it as Sushila Koirala Theater in honor of Sushila Koirala, the first ever theater director from Biratnagar. Aarohan Gurukul then had dozens of talented artists working for it. It ran regular performances and publications, and held theater festivals of national and international order. The Kathmandu International Theatre Festival held every two years from 2008 to 2012 is supposed to be very instrumental in connecting Kathmandu with the theater of the world outside. It also published books and journals, and organized seminars on theater. Nepali media provided enough space for news and the reviews of the performances held in this center. Gurukul became a very significant public sphere at a time when Nepal was going through political turbulence.

Between the years 2003 and 2012, Aarohan Gurukul worked with international non-governmental organizations and bilateral donor agencies such as MS Nepal and the Norwegian Embassy, in Nepal, and offices of the Government of Nepal such as the Election Commission. It remained busy training theater groups based in Kathmandu and across the country on Kachahari, the Nepali version of Forum Theatre developed by Augusto Boal. Developed by Sunil Pokharel of the Arohan Gurukul, Kachahari plays became a favorite medium to raise awareness about human rights across the country among stakeholders: donors, theater creators, the public, and government authorities. Collaborations with donors made the Gurukul one of the busiest art centers in Nepal. Artists from the Gurukul toured around the country staging social message oriented developmental plays. This brought to it income as well as artists. In the meantime, the Gurukul kept on staging modern plays for its city-based audiences.

== Plays and production ==
- Dreams of Peach Blossoms/Aaruka Fulka Sapna, a play
- Agniko Katha, a play by Abhi Subedi
- Thamelko Yaatraa
- Adapted version of ‘A Doll’s House’ by Ibsen was staged in Norway
- Ek Chihan
- Mahila ka tin roop, a play
- Yajnaseni

== Activities ==
- The group trains artists and runs theatre in 55 districts throughout Nepal. They train marginalised people. They work with street sweepers, factory workers, students, child labourers, journalists and nurses to produce plays.
- They works with local theatre groups throughout the country supported by UNDP. The group also organizes national and international theatre festivals.
- The group runs a youth drama program to support schools that are interested in providing their students creative activities.
- The group is actively involved in pro-democracy movements. It was active in the demonstration of 1990 and 2006.

== Notable artists ==
- Sunil Pokharel, One of the founders
- Abhi Subedi, Playwright
- Balkrishna Sama, Playwright
- Keki Adhikari
- Saugat Malla
- Dayahang Rai
- Namrata Shrestha
- Bipin Karki
