= Naakaa =

- Nepali: नाका
- Directed by: Amit Shrestha
- Produced by: Prawin Takki Karki
- Cinematography: Chintan Raj Bhandari
- Edited by: Bibhusan Basnet, Pooja Gurung
- Music by: Rohit Shakya & Shailesh Shrestha
- Production company: Media Port Production
- Distributed by: HighlightsNepal
- Release date: 1 March 2018 (Nepal)
- Country: Nepal
- Language: Nepali

Naakaa (Nepali:नाका, English: Border) is a 2018 Nepalese drama crime film, directed by Amit Shrestha, written by Arjun Karki (screenplay) and Abhishek Subedi and made under the banner of Media Port. The film stars Bipin Karki, Thinley Lhamo, Robin Tamang and Ghanashyam Joshi in the lead roles. The film is set in Nepal-China border (around Bahrabise) film tells the story of human trafficking.

== Plot ==
Goldie (Bipin Karki) is local goon in Bahrabise who is in need of extra cash. One day he gets a call from another goon/business man to help a girl to cross her through Nepalese border to India. But he faces a lot of challenges while transporting her.

== Cast ==
Source: Rotten Tomatoes

- Bipin Karki as Goldie
- Thinley Lhamo as Sonam
- Ghanashyam Joshi as Shital
- Ram Bhajan Kamat as Ganesh
- Sajan Thapa Magar as Maadey
- Shiva Mukhiya as Lakpa
- Keshav Rai as Khakurel
- Abhishek Subedi as Medical owner
- Robin Tamang as Lata Bob

== Soundtrack ==
No.	Title	Lyrics	Music	Singer(s)	Length
1.	"Mero Naakaa"	Uniq Poet	Rohit Shakya	Uniq Poet, Rohit Shakya, Robin Tamang	3:13
