= Rabindra Jha =

Nepalese actor

Rabindra Kumar Jha
- रवीन्द्र कुमार झा
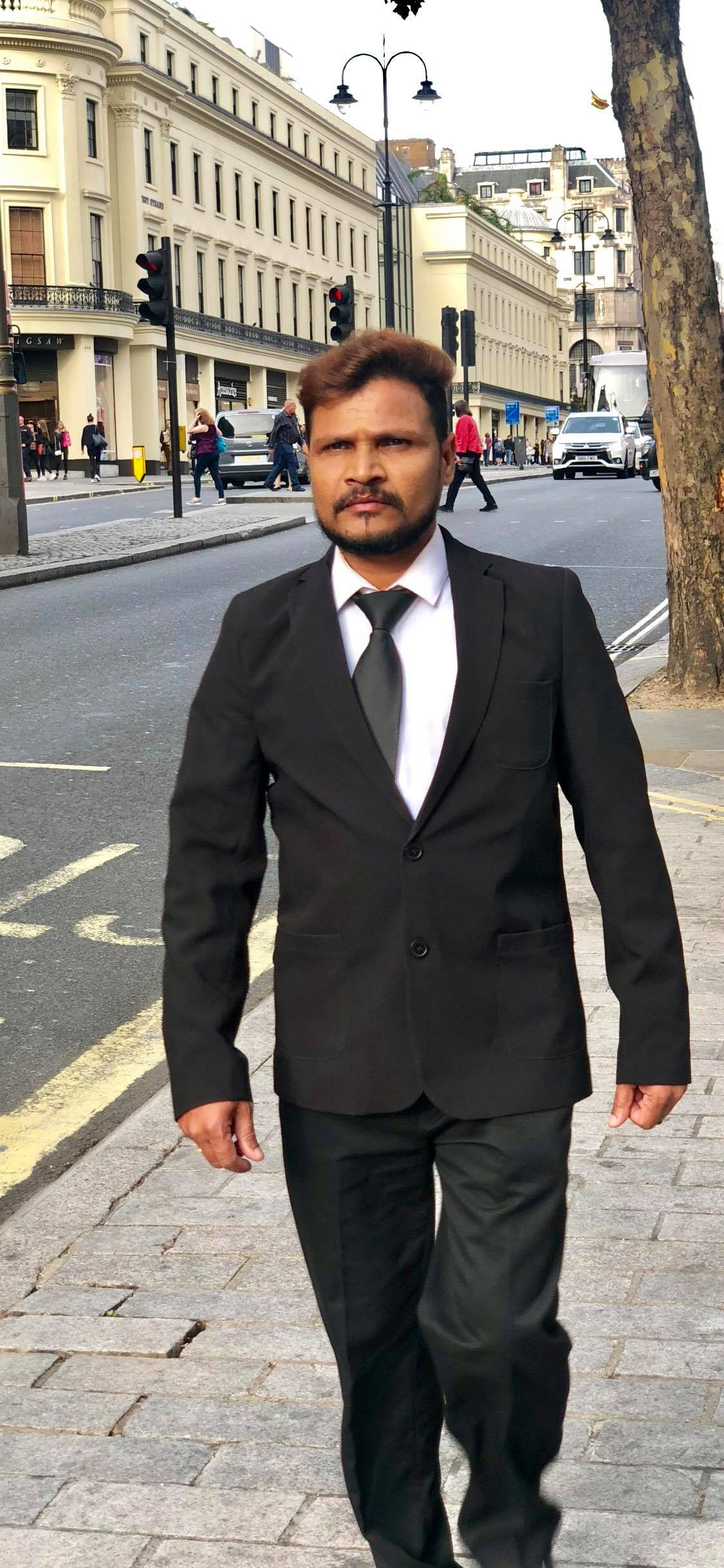
- Rabindra Jha
- Born: March 4, 1978 (age 48); Janakpurdham, Dhanusha, Nepal
- Education: Tribhuwan University
- Occupations: Comedian, Actor, Impersonator, Scriptwriter
- Years active: 2002–present
- Known for: Jatra (2016 film)
- Television: Nepal Film

Rabindra Jha (Nepali: रवीन्द्र झा; born 2 March 1978), is a Nepalese actor, comedian, and scriptwriter also known for his work in Nepali entertainment industry. He has been referred to in the media as "Munna"

Jha began his career with appearances in several television series in the late 1990s. He made his Kollywood debut in 2013 with 12 Nepali Ek Chihan. Early in his career, Jha was recognized for portraying serious and villainous roles in the television series like Mahakabi Vidyapati (1998), Pritam (1999) and Mamta (2001). He then starred in a series of drama, including Pach Patra (2007), Ek xal Ghadaaha (2008), Xutaha Ghail (2008), Okara Agankak Bharah Masha (2009) and Oo Khali Muh Dekhai Xai (2009). Jha went on to act in Aaig Dhadaik Rahal Xai (2010), Kappar Coat (2010), Dom Kakxa (2010) and Push Jharh Ki Magh Jhar (2010). His highest-grossing films include the comedies like Jatra., Changa Chet (2018), Ram Kahani (2018), and Jatrai Jatra (2019). Many of his films display themes of Nepali national identity and connections with communities, or gender, racial, social and religious differences and grievances.

He is a frequent television presenter and stage show performer.

== Early life and background ==
Jha was born in Dhanusha District, Janakpur, Nepal, to Uma Kant Jha and Lila Devi Jha in a Maithil Brahmin family. His father was a government driver. From a young age, Jha was very interested in singing and acting. His father too enjoyed with his hobbies. He lived and grew up in Janakpur's Dhanusha District and later he moved to Kathmandu to complete his degree. He received his school education from Sankatmochan Dev Sharan Ramrati Higher School, simultaneously learning Drama. He enrolled in Kathmandu's Nepal Commerce Campas for higher education. He requested his father that he wanted to learn drama further, and his father somehow managed to send him Delhi. Jha went to Delhi to learn drama and lived in Delhi for three years learning Drama. Jha also has an older brother and a sister. When Jha was a teenager, his father asked him what he aspired to be. Jha expressed his desire to become an actor.

After having obtained a degree in arts and commerce while in India, he studied drama in Delhi, India. During his classes, he had got an opportunity to cast a role in the movie Pinjar (film) but he left it due to his college rules. He completed his degree of drama from Adi Natya Dristhi.

After completing the degree, he returned to Nepal and completed his degree in arts. Jha effectively made himself driven with two degrees. He then joined Mithila Natyakala Parishad (MINAP). He worked as a drama artist for 10 years with small movies. He also worked as a side actor in various films. One day, he was called for the movie Jatra. Disappointed with himself, he wanted to cast in the movie. Next day, Jha was signed for a lead role by director Pradeep Bhattarai for the movie Jatra . Although he debuted with the movie 12 Nepali Ek Chihan, he was unable to fix his position in the industries.

== Career ==
Jha acted in the Nepali movie Jatra. He played the role of Munna.

He has debuted with "12 Nepali Ek Chihan". He has been involved in movie Sunkesari, Kohalpur Express, Jatrai Jatra, Sherbahadur, Dui Rupaiya.

Rabindra Jha has also acted in a comedy Nepali horror movie Sunkesari in 2018. He was working in Radio Drama Sangor and Hilkor as script writer and later executed as director, which he left in 2017. He is currently working in Nepal Film Industry. He had also acted in other famous Maithali films like Pritam, Kanya Putra.

== Filmography ==
Rabindra Jha filmography
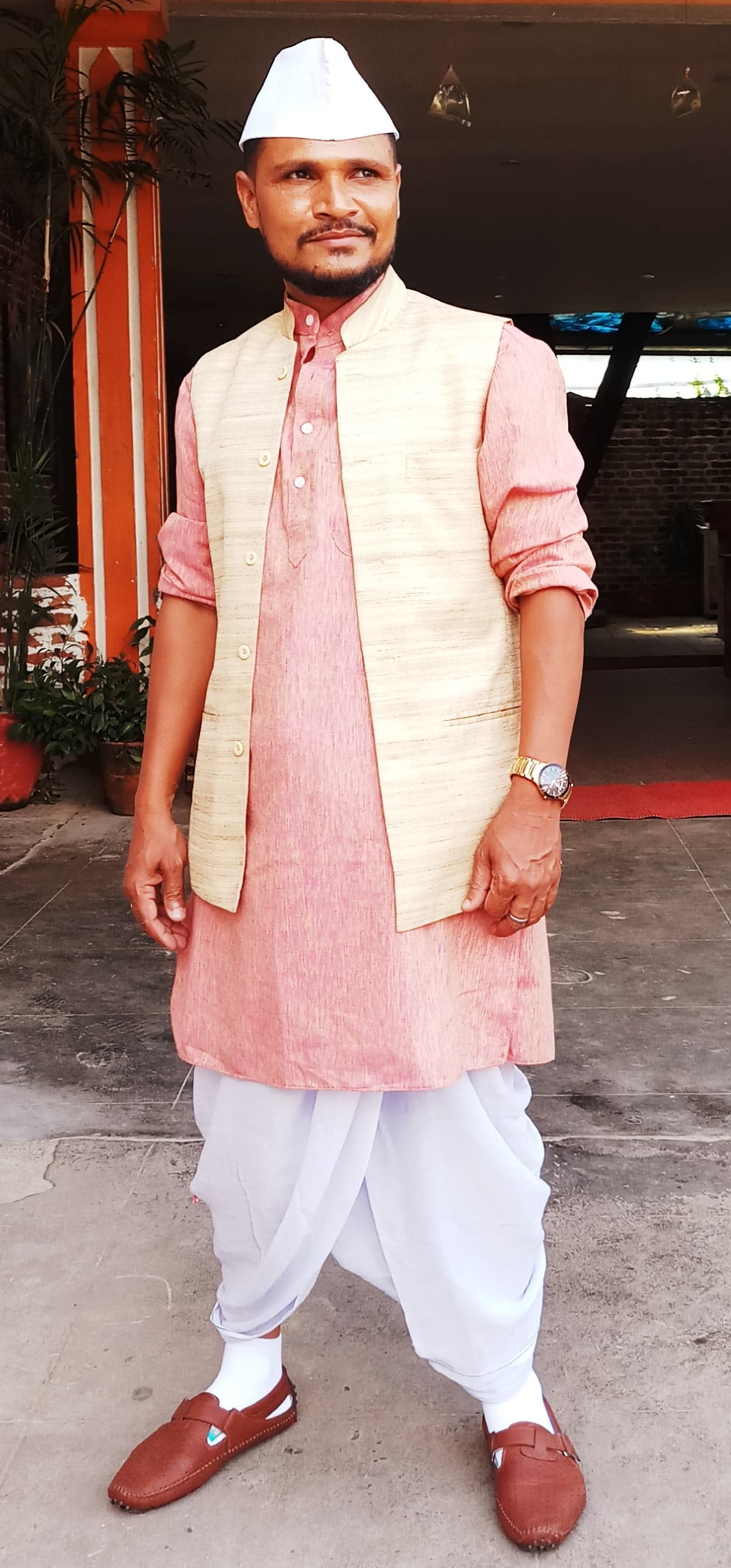
- Rabindra Jha on set
- Film: 45
- Television series: 5
- Theatre: 42

Year	Title	Role	Director(s)	Notes	Ref(s)
2013	12 Nepali Ek Chihan	Sanjay Thakur	Arun Pradhan	Debut Film	
2015	Chanke Sanke Panke	Minister	Sudarshan Thapa		
2016	Jatra	Munna Thakur	Pradeep Bhattarai		
2017	Dui Rupaiyan	Mandal	Asim Shah	Ambulance Driver	
2017	Fateko Jutta	Mahanta Thakur	Nikesh Khadka		
2018	Sherbahadur	Bihari	Raj Rajbanshi		
2018	Kohalpur Express		Bishal Bhandari		
2018	Sunkesari	Yadav	Arpan Thapa		
2018	Mr. Virgin	Pyashi Mohan	Bisharad Basnet		
2018	Ramkahani	Bajrangi	Sudarshan Thapa		
2018	Changa Chet	Udit Narayan Jha	Dipendra K Khanal		
2019	Subha Love	Doctor	Santos Babu Lohani		
2019	Chauka Dau	Estate agent	Prunandu Jha		
2019	A Mero Hajur 3	Rambhajan	Jharana Thapa	6th Highest Grossing Nepali film	
2019	Jatrai Jatra	Munna Thakur	Pradeep Bhattarai	Sequel Film of Jatra	.
2019	Na Yeta Na Uta	Khukari DON	Bisharad Basnet, Miraz Roshan		
2019	Password (2019 Nepali film)	Kanhaiya	Samrat Basnet		
2019	Rato Tika Nidhar Ma	Uncle	Ashok Sharma		
2020	Hridaya Bhari	Yahu	Suraj Subba		
2022	Mand Mand †		Raj Bahadur Sane	Post-Production	
2022	Aakhase Kheti †	Filming			
2022	Uday Subba †	Filming			
2024	Mahajatra	Munna			
2026	Aa Bata Aama				
2026	Hami Teen Bhai				
2026	Gauthali				

== Awards and nominations ==
Year	Film	Award	Category	Result
2019	Sherbahadur	Kamana Film Award	Best Actor – Supporting Role	Nominated
2019	Jatrai Jatra	Image Award	Best Actor – Male	Nominated
2020	Ramkahani	Kamana Film Award	Best Actor – Comic Role	Nominated
