= Mahajatra =

2024 Nepalese film written & directed by Pradip Bhattarai

- Theatrical release poster
- Nepali: महाजात्रा
- Directed by: Pradip Bhattarai
- Written by: Pradip Bhattarai
- Produced by: Max Dipesh Khatri; Yangyashwar Paudel
- Starring: Hari Bansha Acharya; Bipin Karki; Rabindra Jha; Rabindra Singh Baniya; Barsha Raut
- Edited by: Mitra D. Gurung
- Music by: Ashish Aviral
- Production company: Shatkon Arts
- Distributed by: Station 5 (Kathmandu); DCN(Nepal); MSM Entertainments(International)
- Release date: 22 March 2024 (Nepal)
- Running time: 160 mins
- Country: Nepal
- Language: Nepali
- Budget: est.रू4.5 crore
- Box office: est.रू26.68 crore

Mahajatra (Nepali: महाजात्रा) is a 2024 Nepali comedy film written and directed by Pradip Bhattarai under the banner of Shatkon Arts. Produced by Max Dipesh Khatri, Yagyashwor Poudel, and Rabindra Singh Baniya, it was released on March 22, 2024. The film stars Hari Bansha Acharya, Bipin Karki, Rabindra Singh Baniya, Rabindra Jha, and Barsha Raut. It is the sequel to the 2019 film, Jatrai Jatra. The film was released in forty countries.

== Cast ==
- Hari Bansha Acharya as Punya Prasad
- Bipin Karki as Phadindra Timsina / Pharen
- Rabindra Singh Baniya as Joyesh
- Rabindra Jha as Munna
- Barsha Raut as Sampada
- Rajaram Poudel
- Arjun Jung Shahi
- Shishir Wangdel
- Mohan Niraula
- Puskar Gurung
- Prakash Ghimire
- Gaumaya Gurung
- Divya Dev as Viral Inspector Khatri
- Rajani Gurung
- Suman Karki

== Soundtrack ==
The first song, Hamro Jodi, was released on January 15, 2024, sung by Ashish Aviral and Ashmita Adhikari. The lyrics were written by Ek Narayan Bhandari. The second song, Sathi, was released on March 27, 2024, sung and composed by Kali Prasad Baskota. The lyrics were written by Harka Saud.

| No. | Title | Lyrics | Singer(s) | Length |
|---|---|---|---|---|
| 1. | "Hamro Jodi" | Ek Narayan Bhandari | Ashish Aviral, Ashmita Adhikari | 4:01 |
| 2. | "Sathi" | Harka Saud | Kali Prasad Baskota | 2:39 |
| Total length: | | | | 6:40 |

== Reception ==
=== Box office ===
The film grossed रु6.24 crore in its first week, making it a major hit in the Nepali film industry. The film grossed रु8.08 crore in Nepal and रु5 crore overseas in the first 10 days of release, totaling around रु13 crore worldwide. The film raked in रु23.1 crore globally by the end of its third week of release, including रु14.1 crore from Nepal and approximately रु9 crore from abroad. After its successful 51 days run, the film managed to collect रु15.68 crore in Nepal and रु11 crore from overseas making it the highest grossing Nepali film overseas and one of the highest-grossing Nepali film of all time.

=== Critical reception ===
The film received mixed to positive reviews from the critics.
