= Bipin Karki =

Nepalese film and theatre actor

- बिपिन कार्कि
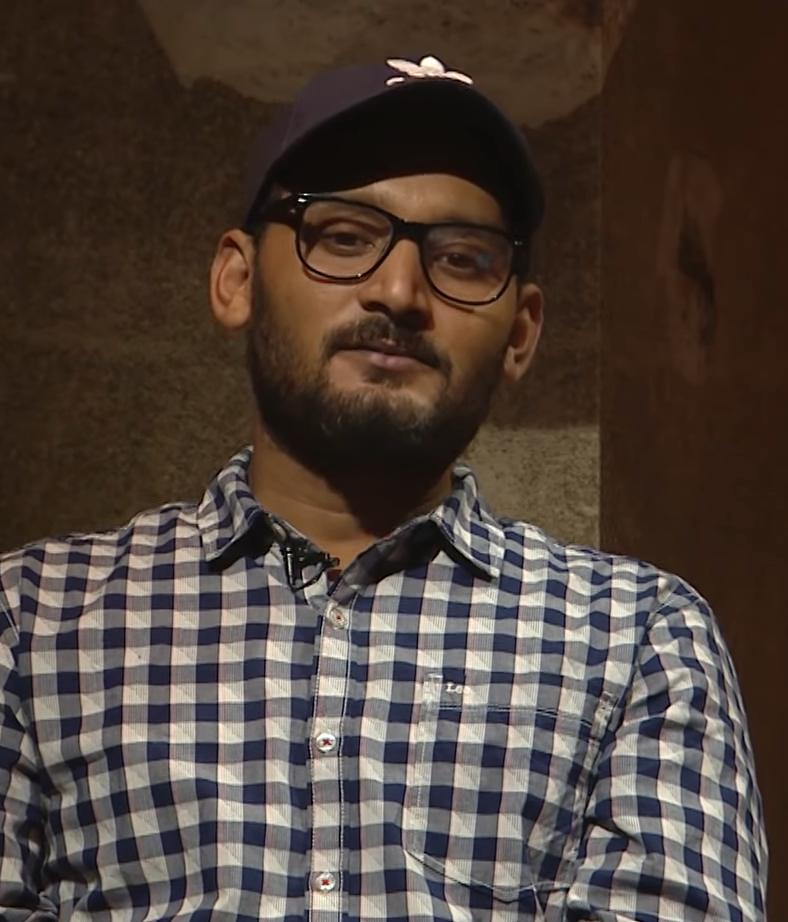
- Born: 21 August 1982 (age 43); Bahuni, Morang District, Nepal
- Other name: Bhasme Don
- Citizenship: Nepal
- Occupation: Actor
- Years active: 2012–present
- Known for: Pashupati Prasad
- Style: Method acting
- Spouse: Reshma Katuwal

Bipin Karki (Nepali: बिपिन कार्की, born 21 August 1982 in Bahuni, Nepal) is a Nepalese film and theatre actor known for his work in Nepali cinema.

Karki started acting at a young age by appearing in stage plays with his brother, Arjun Karki. Karki performed stage plays with Kamal Mani Nepal and his guru Sunil Pokharel at Gurukul Theatre in Kathmandu in 2005. As a screen actor, he first appeared in Loot (2012) as a Gangster (short role) and then had a role in Chhadke (2013). He rose to prominence after starring in Pashupati Prasad in a villain role and won a National Film Award.

== Early life and family ==
Karki was born on 21 August 1982 in Bahuni, Morang District, Nepal. In 2016, he married Reshma Katuwal and they have a daughter.

== Acting career ==
From a young age, Karki appeared in various stage plays in his hometown, Bahuni. Then he moved to Kathmandu, Nepal, to appear in theatre plays. He acted with his friend from his village, Kamal Mani Nepal, now a Nepalese actor. After appearing in a few theatre plays, he met Sunil Pokharel, who helped him improve his acting skills. He joined Gurukul Theatre in 2005.

He appeared in Nischal Basnet's Loot (2012) in a short role as a Gangster. He then acted in Chhadke (2013), appearing in a lead role as Bindu. He acted in Pashupati Prasad which was well received.

In 2014 he appeared in Suntali (2014) as Bidur. Karki rose to fame after appearing in Pashupati Prasad (2016) and won many awards after the film's release, including the National Film Award. Then he appeared in Jatra (2016) in the lead role; the film became one of the successful films of Karki's career and he won 9th Dcine Award for the best actor.

In 2018, he starred in Hari. The same year, he also appeared in Gopi.

== Filmography ==
Key
†	Denotes films that have not yet been released

Year	Title	Role	Notes	Ref(s)
2012	Loot	Pittal Don	Debut Film	
2013	Chhadke	Bindu		
2014	Tandav	Pratik		
2014	Suntali	Bidur		
2015	Kalo Pothi: The Black Hen	Jit Bahadur		
2016	Pashupati Prasad	Bhasmey Don		
2016	Jatra	Phadindra Timsina		
2017	Loot 2	Pittal Don		
2017	Naakaa	Goldie		
2018	Lalpurja	Nursing		
2018	Hari	Hari		
2018	Gopi	Gopi		
2018	Prasad	Baburam		
2019	Jatrai Jatra	Phadindra Timsina		
2020	Selfie King	Gopal		
2022	Ke Ghar Ke Dera	Shankar		
2023	Fulbari	Jay Narayan		
2023	Prasad 2	Baburam		
2023	Ek Bhagavad ra Ek Gita	Kamala		
2023	Pashupati Prasad 2: Bhasme Don	Bhasme Don		
2024	Mahajatra	Phadindra Timsina		
2024	Tel Visa			
2025	Unko Sweater	Dharanidhar Kafle		
2025	Karma			
2026	Pahad			
2026	Kaji			

== Awards and nominations ==
Year	Award	Category	Work	Result	Ref(s)
2016	NEFTA Film Award	Best Actor in a Negative Role	Pashupati Prasad	Won	
2016	Kamana Film Award	Best Actor in a Negative Role	Pashupati Prasad	Won	
2016	Dcine Award	Best Actor in a Negative Role	Pashupati Prasad	Won	
2017	NFDC National Film Award	"Shiva" Best Actor in a Leading Role (Male)	Jatra	Won	
2017	National Film Award	Best Actor in a Leading Role (Male)	Jatra	Won	
2017	FISCON Critic Award	Best Actor	Jatra	Won	
2017	Dcine Award	Best Actor in a Leading Role (Male)	Jatra	Won	
2017	Kamana Film Award	Best Actor in a Leading Role (Male)	Jatra	Won	
2018	Kamana Film Award	Best Actor in a Negative Role	Naakaa	Nominated	
2019	NEFTA Film Award	Best Actor in a Leading Role (Male)	Prasad	Won	
2019	National Film Award	Best Actor in a Leading Role (Male)	Prasad	Won	
2020	Kamana Film Award	Best Actor in a Leading Role (Male)	Prasad	Won	
2020	Kamana Film Award	Best Actor in a Leading Role (Male)	Gopi	Nominated	
