= The Last Hour (TV series) =

Indian television series

- Promotional Poster
- Created by: Amit Kumar and Anupama Minz
- Written by: Anupama Minz and Amit Kumar
- Starring: Sanjay Kapoor; Shahana Goswami; Karma Takapa; Raima Sen; Shaylee Krishen; Robin Tamang; Mandakini Goswami
- Country of origin: India
- Original languages: Hindi; English
- No. of seasons: 1
- No. of episodes: 8

Production
- Executive producer: Asif Kapadia
- Running time: 30-40 minutes approx

Original release
- Network: Amazon Prime Video
- Release: 14 May 2021 – present

The Last Hour is an Indian supernatural crime thriller series on Amazon Prime Video. Starring Sanjay Kapoor, Karma Takapa, Shahana Goswami, Raima Sen, Shaylee Krishen and Mandakini Goswami. The series is created, directed and produced by Amit Kumar and Anupama Minz. The story revolves around the life of a mysterious shaman who can talk to spirits of dead people, and the drama that unfolds around it. The series premiered on the OTT platform Amazon Prime Video on May 14, 2021.

== Plot ==
Arup is a Mumbai-based Police officer who is assigned a case after his transfer to the northeast. An actress from Bengal is brutally raped and murdered. In between the investigation, we see many locals on the run for saving their lives. Dev, is an archer who is seen shooting arrows in the wilderness.

Dev is a Shaman who can communicate with the soul of the dead body and relive their last hour. Arup takes help from Dev for solving murders in the vicinity. However, Dev always finds a way to find something more than he is required by using his Shaman power. He also manages to check-on Pari, Arup's daughter, while he falls in love.

Yama Nadu is following Dev to kill him because Dev injured his eye that can envision a person's death. He is assisted by his right-hand, Thapa.

== Cast ==
- Sanjay Kapoor as DCP Arup Singh
- Karma Takapa as Dev
- Shahana Goswami as SI Lipika Bora
- Raima Sen as Nyima
- Clifford Liu as Commissioner Bhutia
- Robin Tamang as Yama Nadu
- Tenzein Choden as Doma
- Shaylee Krishen as Pari Singh
- Mandakini Goswami as Amoo
- Dewashish lama as Pinto
- Vivek Pradhan as Young Dev
- Jatin Payeng as Boatman
- Bisharanjan Sapam as Jo
- Chien Ho Liao as Inspector Jaideep Rana
- Lapchen Lepcha as Constable Raj
- Shivangi Kumar as Arzoo Mukherjee
- Edwin Rai as SI Tamang
- Kiki Lhamu Bhutia as Eila
- Biru Tamang as Sonam
- D.K Lepcha as Sonam's Mother
- Lanuakum Ao as Thapa
- Prashant Sharma as Male Reporter
- Younita Pandey as Tattoo artist

== Episodes ==
=== Season 1 ===
No.	Title	Directed by	Written by	Original release date
1	"A Meeting Of Two Worlds"	Amit Kumar	Anupama Minz and Amit Kumar	May 14, 2021
2	"I Spy With My Little Eye"	Amit Kumar	Anupama Minz and Amit Kumar	May 14, 2021
3	"Dark Night"	Amit Kumar	Anupama Minz and Amit Kumar	May 14, 2021
4	"A Question Of Time"	Amit Kumar	Anupama Minz and Amit Kumar	May 14, 2021
5	"First Steps Are Always Small"	Amit Kumar	Anupama Minz and Amit Kumar	May 14, 2021
6	"And Then There Was Another"	Amit Kumar	Anupama Minz and Amit Kumar	May 14, 2021
7	"The Boy Who Cried Wolf"	Amit Kumar	Anupama Minz and Amit Kumar	May 14, 2021
8	"The Circle Of Life"	Amit Kumar	Anupama Minz and Amit Kumar	May 14, 2021

== Reception ==
As per Prateek Sur from The Free Press Journal, the producers and directors made a good decision of casting local actors over the big shots. The beauty of the Northeast is very well portrayed. Beautiful locations from the northeast are hardly utilized in Indian cinema and web series scene, but The Last Hour did a good job on that. He also says that the series seems too long for the premise and could be an easy 2.5–3 hours movie to start with.

Raja Sen from Live Mint Lifestyle is very much impressed by Jayesh Nair's cinematography. He says that it is exquisite. Raja says that Takapa is a magnetic performer and matches the narrative naturally.

Scroll.in sums up its review in a single line that says the web series could deliver a lot more based on its unusual theme, but it somehow falls short to make justice with the unique storyline.

Tatsam Mukherjee from First Post wrote "Despite exoticising the North-East, Sanjay Kapoor's series tries to be authentic and manages to make some bold choices."
