= Khyentse Norbu =

Bhutanese writer and filmmaker

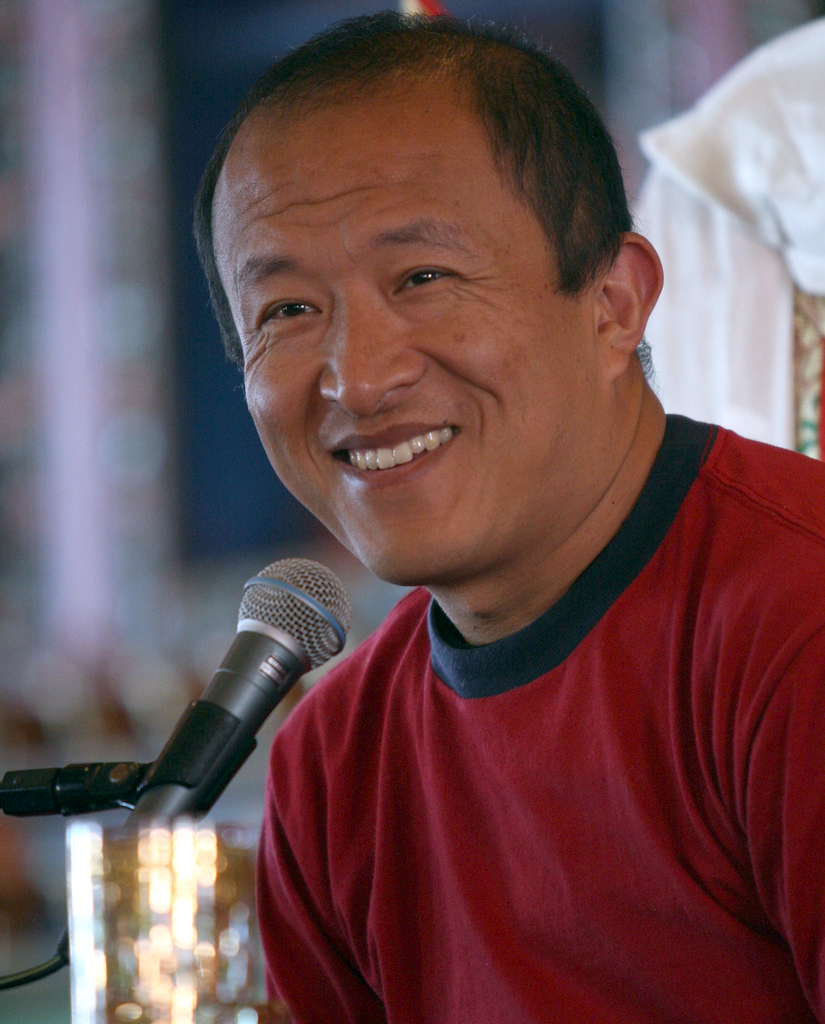
- Title: Lama; Tulku; Rinpoche

Personal life
- Born: Dzongsar Jamyang Khyentse Rinpoche; June 18, 1961 (age 64) Bhutan
- Occupation: Filmmaker, writer

Religious life
- Religion: Vajrayana (Sakya)

Senior posting
- Teacher: His Holiness 41st Sakya Trichen Rinpoche, Dilgo Khyentse Rinpoche, Khenpo Appey
- Predecessor: Dzongsar Khyentse Chökyi Lodrö

Dzongsar Jamyang Khyentse Rinpoche (Tibetan: རྫོང་གསར་འཇམ་དབྱངས་མཁྱེན་བརྩེ་རིན་པོ་ཆེ།, born June 18, 1961), also known as Khyentse Norbu, is a Tibetan Lama, filmmaker, and writer who was born in Bhutan. His five major films are The Cup (1999), Travellers and Magicians (2003), Vara: A Blessing (2013), Hema Hema: Sing Me a Song While I Wait (2017), and Looking for a Lady with Fangs and a Moustache (2019). He is the author of several published books such as What Makes You Not a Buddhist (2007), Not For Happiness: A Guide to the So-Called Preliminary Practices (2012), The Guru Drinks Bourbon? (2016), Living is Dying (2020), and several non-fiction works on Tibetan Buddhism for free distribution such as Introduction to the Middle Way: Chandrakirti’s Madhyamaka with Commentary (2003) and Buddha Nature: Mahayana-Uttaratantra-Shastra with Commentary (2007). He has also written an autobiography in process entitled Mugwort Born. Many of his teachings are available on the Siddhartha's Intent YouTube channel.

He is the eldest son of Thinley Norbu, and therefore the grandson of Dudjom Jigdral Yeshe Dorje. Rinpoche has teachers from all four major schools of Tibetan Buddhism and is a follower and champion of the Rimé (non-sectarian) movement. He considers Dilgo Khyentse as his main guru. He is also the primary custodian of the teachings of Jamyang Khyentse Wangpo.

== Lineage ==
Dzongsar Jamyang Khyentse Rinpoche was born in eastern Bhutan in 1961 at a place called Khenpajong. At the age of seven he was recognized, by Sakya Trizin, as the third incarnation (Wylie: sprul sku) of the founder of Khyentse lineage of Tibetan Buddhism.

The first incarnation was Jamyang Khyentse Wangpo (1820–1892), who helped found the Rimé movement alongside Jamgon Kongtrul Lodro Thaye and others, with a non-sectarian approach to Tibetan Buddhism, centred in Dzongsar Monastery in Sichuan. Followers of this non-sectarian movement sought to identify and make use of the best methods from the various long-competing and isolated schools of Tibetan Buddhism. This approach led to a blossoming of scholarship and writing from the 1880s onwards.

The second incarnation was the renowned lama Dzongsar Khyentse Chökyi Lodrö (1893–1959), who figured prominently in the export of Tantric Buddhism to the West as the root-teacher of a generation of influential and forward-thinking lamas.

A biographical portrait of Dzongsar Khyentse Rinpoche exists in documentary feature film form. The film came out in 2003, and is called Words of My Perfect Teacher, after the English rendering of a famed work by Patrul Rinpoche. It is a portrait of the Vajrayana Buddhist student-teacher relationship.

== Education ==
Until the age of twelve, Khyentse Norbu studied at the Palace Monastery of the King of Sikkim. Reflecting the unusual non-sectarian tradition of the Khyentse lineage, he counts as his root-masters teachers from all four main schools of Tibetan Buddhism (i.e. Sakya, Gelug, Nyingma, Kagyu). He has studied with several influential contemporary masters, particularly Dilgo Khyentse. After leaving Sikkim he studied at Sakya College in Rajpur, and later attended SOAS, University of London.

From a young age, he has been active in the preservation of the Buddhist teaching, establishing centres of learning, supporting practitioners, publishing books and teaching all over the world. Dzongsar Khyentse Rinpoche supervises his traditional seat of Dzongsar Monastery and its retreat centers in eastern Tibet, as well as his new colleges in India (in Bir and Chauntra (Himachal Pradesh) and Bhutan. He has also established centres in Australia, North America and the Far East.

He established Deer Park Institute as a center for "the study of classical Indian wisdom traditions" in March 2006 under Siddhartha's Intent Society, India, with the vision to "re-create the spirit of Nalanda, the great university of ancient India in which all traditions of Buddhism were studied and practiced, alongside other schools of classical Indian philosophy, arts and sciences."

In 1989, Dzongsar Khyentse Rinpoche founded Siddhartha's Intent, an international Buddhist association of non-profit centres, most of which are nationally registered societies and charities, with the principal intention of preserving the Buddhist teachings, as well as increasing an awareness and understanding of the many aspects of the Buddhist teaching beyond the limits of cultures and traditions.

While working with Tibetan refugees in northern India, Khyentse Norbu was struck by the absence of media attention to the abject suffering of thousands of children. In 1993, he founded the secular White Lotus Charitable Trust, dedicated to serving the most neglected and forgotten children through education.

Volunteering his own time and resources to establish the initial infrastructure, Khyentse Norbu inspired others around the world, regardless of spiritual traditions, to help White Lotus become a global volunteer network of like-minded humanists. International followers of his work and his vision founded their own networks the United Kingdom, Canada, Australia, Germany, France, Hong Kong and Taiwan with a view to supporting LO programs in India and Cambodia.

In 2002, Lotus Outreach was incorporated as a non-profit 501(c)(3) organization in southern California to create an American center of infrastructure, dedicated to ensuring the education, health and safety of at-risk and exploited women and children in India and Cambodia. Its all-volunteer International board of directors continues to raise funds and increase awareness in their home countries on issues surrounding poverty and exploitation in Asia.

In 2001 Khyentse Foundation was founded by Dzongsar Khyentse. It is a non-profit organization with the stated goal "to act as a system of patronage for institutions and individuals engaged in the practice and study of Buddha's wisdom and compassion." The foundation is self-described as "[w]orking toward a harmonious, joyful, and awakened world by supporting people and projects that preserve and promote Buddha's wisdom."

== Filmmaking ==
Khyentse Norbu appeared in and, as a consultant "supervised every ritual and gesture performed by Tibetan monks," in Bernardo Bertolucci's 1993 film Little Buddha.

Khyentse Norbu wrote and directed four award-winning films, The Cup (1999), for which The New York Times called him "a born filmmaker;" Travellers and Magicians (2003), the first feature film to be produced in Bhutan; Vara: A Blessing (2013), and Hema Hema: Sing Me A Song While I Wait (2016).

He appears in the 2009 documentary Tulku, where he discusses Buddhism and his views on the tulku phenomenon.

Vara: The Blessing (2013) opened South Korea's famed Busan International Film Festival. It was the first time that the South Korean festival has not opened with either a local Korean or a Chinese film.

Hema Hema: Sing Me a Song While I Wait, premiered at the Locarno Festival in 2016, and received an honourable mention from the Platform Prize jury at the 2016 Toronto International Film Festival. The movie depicts a mysterious ritual in the forest where all participants are masked, was praised by critics for "its portrayal of complex Buddhist themes like transgression, by juxtaposing them on to modern topics like anonymity on the Internet."

Looking for a Lady With Fangs and a Moustache (2019) tells the story of a skeptical entrepreneur seeking spiritual advice from an eccentric Buddhist monk who predicts the man's imminent death, unless he can locate an elusive lady with fangs.

His latest film, Pig at the Crossing (2024), follows Dolom, a 29-year-old YouTube creator and new teacher in Bhutan. After a one-night stand with a married woman, Deki, 32, leads to an unexpected pregnancy, Dolom devises a plan to save his reputation. However, a motorcycle accident on his way to meet Deki propels him into a chaotic, otherworldly realm. Realizing he is dead, Dolom, with the help of a mysterious guide, must confront his past and the consequences of his actions. He faces a choice: correct his wrongs and move on, or remain trapped in a timeless, dream-like state.

== Selected publications ==
- Poison is Medicine (2021)
- Living Is Dying: How to Prepare for Death, Dying and Beyond (2020)
- Best Foot Forward: A Pilgrim's Guide to the Sacred Sites of the Buddha (2018)
- The Guru Drinks Bourbon? (2016)
- Not for Happiness: A Guide to the So-Called Preliminary Practices (2012)
- Teachings on Ngöndro
- What Makes You Not a Buddhist (2008)
- What to do at India's Buddhist Holy Sites
- Buddha Nature
- Introduction to the Middle Way
