= Looking for a Lady With Fangs and a Moustache =

- Promotional poster
- Directed by: Khyentse Norbu
- Written by: Khyentse Norbu
- Produced by: Max Dipesh Khatri; Rabindra Singh Baniya
- Starring: Tsering Tashi Gyalthang; Tulku Kungzang; Ngawang Tenzin; Tenzin Kunsel; Orgen Tobgyal Rinpoche
- Cinematography: Mark Lee Ping-bing
- Edited by: Yu Tao
- Music by: Mars Radio
- Production companies: Philosojoy Production; Shatkon Arts
- Distributed by: Abramorama
- Release date: October 2019 (Morelia International Film Festival)
- Running time: 113 minutes
- Country: Nepal
- Languages: Nepali; Tibetan; English

Looking for a Lady With Fangs and a Moustache is a 2019 Nepalese mystery drama film written and directed by Khyentse Norbu and starring amateur actor Tsering Tashi Gyalthang in the lead role. The film premiered at the 2019 Morelia International Film Festival.

== Plot ==
While preparing to convert an abandoned Temple into a premier cafe, Nepalese entrepreneur Tenzin is warned by an elderly monk that he will soon die, unless he finds a particular dakini that has fangs and a moustache.

== Cast ==
- Tsering Tashi Gyalthang as Tenzin
- Tulku Kungzang as Jachung
- Ngawang Tenzin as Monk
- Orgen Tobgyal Rinpoche as Master of Left Hand Lineage

== Production ==
The film was written and directed by Khyentse Norbu, who wanted to "explore some of the last genuine residues of Tibetan mysticism". Max Dipesh Khatri and Rabindra Singh Baniya served as the film's producers, while Zhuangzhuang Tian, Olivia Harrison, Ram Raju, Aona Liu, and Kate McCreery were credited as executive producers. Norbu worked exclusively with non-professional actors, and filming took place in Kathmandu.

== Release ==
Abramorama secured the distribution rights to Looking for a Lady With Fangs and a Moustache. The film had its "virtual live premiere" on April 8, 2021, at the Rubin Museum of Art in New York City.

== Critical reception ==
On review aggregator Rotten Tomatoes, the film has an approval rating of 91% based on 11 reviews. Metacritic, which assigns a rating in the 0–100 range based on reviews from top mainstream critics, calculated an average score of 67 based on 4 reviews, indicating "generally favorable" reception. Dennis Harvey of Variety called the film "beguiling", while Michael Rechtshaffen of the Los Angeles Times found it "intriguing and distinctive". Film Threat reviewer Alex Saveliev likened the film to "an extended confession at a Buddhist temple". Nicolas Rapold of The New York Times criticized the lead actor's "desultory" performance and added that "the drift of the filmmaking seemed to fall short of the transcendence envisioned by its story."
