= Samir Upadhyay =

- Occupations: Film Producer; Entrepreneur

Samir Upadhyay, the founder of Spiralogics Inc, is a Nepalese currently staying in the United States. He has completed his bachelor's in computer science from Southern Arkansas University. He recently produced a Nepali feature film Anaagat starring Priyanka Karki & Arpan Thapa in the lead.
