= Saanghuro =

- Film poster
- Nepali: साँघुरो
- Directed by: Joes Pandey
- Written by: Binod Paudel
- Produced by: Sameer Mainali; Mountain River Films
- Starring: Shushank Mainali; Deeya Maskey; Dayahang Rai; Buddhi Tamang
- Cinematography: Sushan Prajapati
- Edited by: Anjjay Khadka
- Music by: Madan Gopal; Udgam Pariyar
- Release date: 26 April 2013
- Running time: 120 minutes
- Country: Nepal
- Language: Nepali

Saanghuro (Nepali: साँघुरो) is a Nepali film. It involves the psycho-social conflict of characters that leads to unusual circumstances and raises unsolved questions. The story is built around members of a lower-middle-class family living in an urban slum. Poverty is the part of their lives and the insecurity that comes with having to worry about whether their house might collapse is ever-present. The film was directed by Joes Pandey and produced by Sameer Mainal.

== Synopsis ==
Krishna is a paper boy, and his mother works as a sweeper. Krishna falls in love with Kamala, a domestic worker to a rich family, and the two marry. The film portrays the psychology of the newly wedded couple who are powerless to do anything about the physical distance that is imposed upon them because of his mother's constant presence in their shared room.

== Cast ==
- Shushank Mainali as Krishna
- Deeya Maskey as Kamala
- Aruna Karki as Krishna's Mother
- Dayahang Rai as Tika (Daya Hang Rai)
- Rabi Giri as Krishna's Father
- Gopal Acharya as Malik
- Pushpa Acharya as Malikni
- Sameer Bagale as Malik's Son
- Ishika Mainali as Malik's Daughter
- Buddhi Tamang as Nare
- Bijay Baral as Daju
- Rabindra Shahi as Police Officer
- Suresh Aire as Police Man
- Abeeral Thapa as Car Driver
- Shankar Mainali as Doctor 1 (Dr. Shankar Mainali)
- Sudeep Thapa as Doctor 2 (Dr. Sudeep Thapa)

== Awards ==
- National Film Awards 2014 - winning three categories: Best Film; Best Actor (Shushank Mainali); and Best Screenplay (Bimod Paudel)
- NEFTA Film Awards 2014 - winning two categories: Best Actor in a Character Role (Dayahang Rai); and Best Actress in a Character Role (Aruna Karki)
- SAARC Film Festival 2014 in Colombo - two prizes: the film was awarded silver medal (second place); and the director Joes Pandey was awarded the special jury award.
- Saanghuro is the first Nepalese film to be telecasted on a major international TV channel (Channel 4, U.K.).

== See also ==
- List of Nepalese films
