= Nisha Sharma (actor) =

Nepalese actress (born 1971)

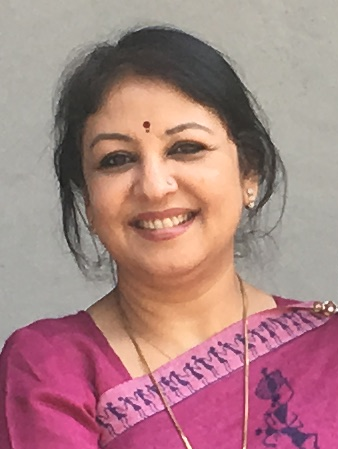
- Born: 2 September 1971 (age 54); Kathmandu
- Occupation: actor
- Known for: Chancellor of the Nepal Academy of Music and Drama
- Spouse: Sunil Pokharel

Nisha Sharma Pokharel (born 2 September 1971) is a Nepalese actor. In 2023 she was chosen as the first woman Chancellor of the Nepal Academy of Music and Drama.

== Life ==
Sharma was born in 1971 in Kathmandu. She met Sunil Pokharel and Badri Adhikari while she was still at school. They had cast her sister as the lead in their production and they wanted a girl to play her sister. She was cast despite her sister's worries that the job would distract her from her studies.

She has had a career of more than thirty years in Nepali theatre and she has appeared in about fifty different productions.

In 2010 the South Asian Women's Theatre Festival took place in Delhi and several plays were staged. Sharma played the main character of Nora in a Nepali adaptation of Henry Ibsen's feminist play A Doll's House. The translated play, Putaliko Ghar, had been adapted by Sunil Pokharel from Henry Ibsen's original. The play was seen by Nepali nationals or those with a Nepali heritage. The important theme of the play is that Nora finally gives up on her husband in order that she can have her own life.

In 2023 she was chosen as the Chancellor of the Nepal Academy of Music and Drama (NAMUDA). She was promoted from Head of Drama in a move that surprised her. She became NAMUDA's first woman Chancellor. She took the oath of office on 16 February 2024 together with two other chancellors in a ceremony with the Prime Minister Pushpa Kamal Dahal. She identified the need for the academy to establish an international position and she also planned to create a library of Nepali folk music and plays. The job was important and she set aside other commitments to concentrate on this role for the four years of her term.
