= Jatra (2016 film) =

2016 Nepalese film written and directed by Pradeep Bhattarai

- Theatrical Poster
- जात्रा
- Directed by: Pradip Bhattarai
- Written by: Pradip Bhattarai
- Produced by: Rabindra Singh Baniya; Singe Lama; Yangashwor Poudel
- Starring: Bipin Karki; Rabindra Singh Baniya; Rabindra Jha; Barsha Raut
- Cinematography: Dirgha Gurung
- Edited by: Mitra D. Gurung
- Music by: Songs: Roshan Thapa; Score: Rohit Sakya; Shailesh Shrestha
- Production company: Shatkon Arts
- Distributed by: National: POPCORN; International: Highlights Nepal Pvt. Ltd.
- Release date: 11 November 2016 (Nepal)
- Running time: 144 min
- Country: Nepal
- Language: Nepali
- Budget: रु 3.5 Million
- Box office: रु 35,099,345

Jatra is a 2016 Nepali-language heist comedy film written and directed by Pradip Bhattarai. Produced by Rabindra Singh Baniya, Singe Lama, and Yadav Poudel under the banner of Shatkon Arts. It stars Bipin Karki, Rabindra Singh Baniya, and Rabindra Jha in pivotal roles, with a supporting cast of Barsha Raut, Prakash Ghimire, Praween Khatiwada, Bholaraj Sapkota, Kamalmani Nepal, Sajan Thapa Magar, Nilkaji Shakya, Priyanka Jha, Susmita Karki, Prem Pandey, and Safar Pokhrel.

Jatra is primarily shot in Asan Galli Kathmandu Valley, and it tells the story of three individuals who have many problems because of a lack of money. The story revolves around the रु. 3 crore Nepalese rupees that were found by Phadindra Timilsina (Bipin Karki), the various ideas they implement to protect the money from its real owner, and the impacts that occur in his and his friends lives.

Jatra was released on 11 November 2016, in cinemas all over Nepal. It was a sleeper hit at the time of its release and emerged surprise hit at Nepalese box office. It also gained praise from critics for its situational comedy and genuine acting by the lead actors. The film's sequel Jatrai Jatra, released in 2019, was also a commercial success. The 2020 Hindi film Lootcase was heavily inspired by the core plot of this movie.

== Synopsis ==
Phadindra Timsina (Bipin Karki) is an innocent, poor, and hardworking man. He finds a sack full of three crores Nepalese rupees, stolen from a bank. He then consults with his three friends, Jayas (Rabindra Singh Baniya) and Munna (Rabindra Jha), in order to hijack money. The movie deals with all the strategies and hurdles planned and faced by the group of hijack planners in the course of hijacking the money. Poor and innocent Phadindra who is often blamed for his sincerity having been poor finally finds a way to prove his haters wrong. Now, will he be able to show them in real life? This is what the page looks like.

== Cast ==
- Bipin Karki as Phadindra Timsina/Pharen
- Rabindra Singh Baniya as Joyesh
- Rabindra Jha as Munna
- Barsha Raut as Sampada; Pharen's wife
- Prechya Bajracharya as a Pari
- Prakash Ghimire SasuraBa
- Praween Khatiwada
- Kamalmani Nepal as Don
- Bhola Raj Sapkota
- Nilkaji Shakya
- Sajan Thapa Magar
- Priyanka Jha
- Suresh Karki
- Safar Pokharel

== Soundtrack ==
| No. | Title | Lyrics | Music | Singer | Length |
|---|---|---|---|---|---|
| 1. | "Note Note" | Hari Bansha Acharya | Hari Bansha Acharya | Hari Bansha Acharya | 4:31 |
| Total length: | | | | | 4:31 |
