= Hema Hema =

2016 film directed by Khyentse Norbu

Hema Hema: Sing Me a Song While I Wait
- Film poster
- Directed by: Khyentse Norbu
- Written by: Khyentse Norbu
- Produced by: Pawo Choyning Dorji; Sarah Chen
- Cinematography: Jigme Tenzing
- Edited by: Tian Zhuangzhuang; Li Gen
- Release date: August 10, 2016 (Locarno)
- Running time: 96 minutes
- Country: Bhutan
- Language: Dzongkha

Hema Hema: Sing Me a Song While I Wait or simply Hema Hema is a 2016 Bhutanese Dzongkha-language drama film written and directed by Khyentse Norbu.

== Premise ==
Every 12 years, a group of people gather in a forest, wearing masks.

== Release ==
The film premiered at the 69th Locarno Film Festival.

== Critical reception ==
Dan Fainaru praised the work of the film's cinematographer Jigme Tenzing in his review of the film for Screendaily. Jay Weissberg of Variety described the film as "visually rich though narratively challenging". Kuensel's Sonam Wangmo Dukpa also praised Jigme Tenzing's camera work and described the film's scenes as "visual poetry" and "mystic, operatic performance".

The film received an honorable mention from the Platform Prize jury at the 2016 Toronto International Film Festival.
