= Talakjung vs Tulke =

2014 film

- Theatrical release poster
- Directed by: Nischal Basnet
- Written by: Khagendra Lamichhane
- Starring: Khagendra Lamichhane; Shushank Mainali; Dayahang Rai; Reecha Sharma; Buddhi Tamang; Rabindra Singh Baniya
- Distributed by: Mountain River Films
- Release date: 31 October 2014
- Running time: 133 minutes
- Country: Nepal
- Language: Nepali

Talakjung vs Tulke (Nepali: टलकजंग भर्सेस टुल्के) is a 2014 Nepalese action drama film directed by Nischal Basnet and produced by Rabindra Singh Baniya. It was selected as the Nepalese entry for the Best Foreign Language Film at the 88th Academy Awards. The film is based on the 2003 Nepal's maoist revolution.It was commercially successful and received critical acclaim.

== Plot ==
Talak Jung Singh Thakuri (aka Tulke) is a happy individual who lives in a remote village of Nepal. He is a labourer who enjoys life with his friends consisting of Hanuman, Tanke, Dhikare, and an old man. They usually drink together in a local liquor shop. Tulke works for Babu Raja, a wealthy village merchant and his son Binay. Babu Raja is a dictator who has captured the properties of various people in the village and also has two workers to serve him whom are Suke and Fuli. Tulke has a big crush on Fuli but he is unable to express it.

One day Tulke sees his friend Hanuman with the maoist rebels and begins to nag Hanuman to let him join the rebel group . Binay and Babu Raja use Fuli to manipulate him and invite Tulke for dinner to get more information where Tulke while intoxicated with alcohol reveals Hanuman's secret. Babu Raja and Binay plan to kill Hanuman and Tulke the next day but Fuli saves Tulke by blaming him of molestation. Tulke is humiliated and exiled out of the village where he runs away to kathmandu, the capital city. There he meets a gang leader and joins his gang who recover protection money, are involved in theft and are collecting money by acting as fake election agents. They soon get exposed and the gang boss is killed in a police encounter. Tulke is the only man who is left alive. With the money Tulke returns back to his village but is surprised to find all his friends but the old man are missing .

The old man pleads him to return to the city as he fears the same will happen to tulke. Tulke learns from Fuli that Hanuman was killed by Babu Raja and Binay who want to oppress the rebels as the rebels could overthrow their dictatorship. Tulke confronts Babu Raja and Binay about Hanuman's murder and slaps Binay. To protect themselves from rebels Binay and Babu Raja decide to fund them instead but the demand for money kept on growing so Binay decides to get them killed with the help of policemen. But to Binay's surprise he finds out Fule, Suki, Tanke all are the part of rebels and the rebels and policeman kill Binay instead. Enraged Binay's father meets the minister who to eradicate the rebels. A few days later Fuli and Suke meet Tulke in his home and hide explosives in his home. After that a huge war between the rebels and the policemen tipped by Babu Raja takes place, in the violence Suke is able to kill Babu Raja but gets shot as well and dies. The war ends with blood shed and many lives lost. The policemen arrest the surviving rebels, they arrest Tulke because of the explosives that they find in his home. On the way he is forced to identify Fuli as a rebel or not to which Tulke denies as he loves her. Fuli then leaves the village on a bus remembering Tulke as the movie ends.

== Cast ==
- Khagendra Lamichhane as Talakjung "Tulke" Singh Thakuri
- Shushank Mainali as Suke
- Dayahang Rai as Kathmandu Gang Boss
- Reecha Sharma as Fuli
- Rabindra Singh Baniya as Binay
- Buddhi Tamang as Hanuman
- Prakash Ghimire as Binay's Father

== See also ==
- List of submissions to the 88th Academy Awards for Best Foreign Language Film
- List of Nepalese submissions for the Academy Award for Best Foreign Language Film
