= Hari (film) =

Nepalese film

- Nepali: हरि
- Directed by: Pratik Gurung; Safal K.C.
- Written by: Pratik Gurung; Safal K.C.
- Starring: Bipin Karki; Kamal Mani Nepal; Thinley Lhamo; Sunita Thakur
- Edited by: Arjun Karki
- Production company: Shubhalabh Film Production
- Release date: 1 June 2018 (Nepal)
- Country: Nepal
- Language: Nepali

Hari (Nepali: हरि) is a 2018 Nepalese film directed and written by Pratik Gurung and Safal K.C.. The film stars Bipin Karki in the lead role alongside Kamal Mani Nepal, Thinley Lhamo and Sunita Thakur. The film was released on 1 June 2018 in Nepal under the banner of Shubhalabh Film Production.

== Plot ==
Bishnu Hari (Bipin Karki), commonly known as Hari, is a strict religious man who is following rules set by his father, grandfathers and his strict mother known as Parvati. One day a bird excretes on him and then he starts looking for the answer of whether that was a blessing or a curse as he experiences fluctuating fortune in a series of events.

== Cast ==
- Bipin Karki as Bishnu Hari
- Kamal Mani Nepal as Hari's Adversary
- Sunita Thakur as Parvati
- Thinley Lhamo as Mystery Girl

== Reception ==
Bipin Karki, lead actor of the film told Kathmandu Post that Hari was one of the most important roles that he has played so far.
