= Barsha Raut =

Nepalese actress, Businesswoman and a professional model

- वर्षा राउत
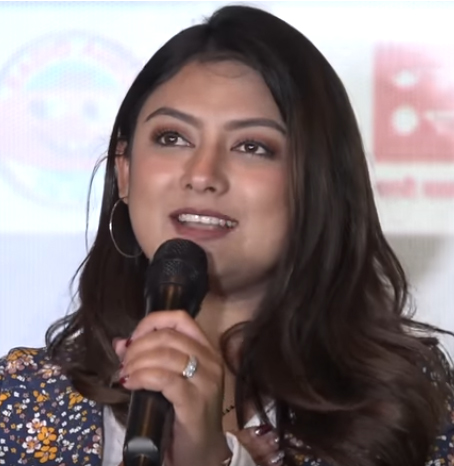
- Barsha Raut at a promotional event
- Born: 14 December 1993 (age 32); Sindhuli, Nepal
- Occupations: Actress, model
- Spouse: Sanjog Koirala (m. 2019)

Barsha Raut (Nepali: वर्षा राउत) is a Nepalese actress known for her works in Nepali cinema. She has worked in critically acclaimed films like Jatra and Gopi, as well as commercially hit films like Chhakka Panja, Chhakka Panja 2, and Jatrai Jatra.

== Life and career ==
Barsha Raut has appeared in numerous music videos, television commercials and Nepali feature films. She started her career as a model with the music video ‘Rojeko Maile’ in 2013. She then featured in several music videos before making it onto the silver screen. She made her acting debut with Nai Nabhannu La 4 opposite Paul Shah and Aanchal Sharma who were also debutantes. The film was a blockbuster at the box office. Her most notable works to date as an actress include hits like Chhakka Panja, Jatra and its sequel Jatrai Jatra, Chhakka Panja 2, Chhakka Panja 3, Mr. Jholay and Gopi. She has been acclaimed for her acting and character in the movie Jatra and has bagged awards from her other movies.

She make her stage debut with the play ‘Hitlor Aaudaichha’ directed by Bimal Subedi held at the Civic Theater in Akron, Ohio, the USA.

== Personal life ==
Raut is married to Sanjog Koirala on 14 February 2019.

== Filmography ==
Films
Year (A.D)	Film	Role	Director	Notes
2016	Nai Nabhannu La 4	Anjana	Bikash Raj Acharya	Debut film
2016	Chhakka Panja	Brinda	Deepa Shree Niraula	
2016	Jatra	Sampada	Pradip Bhattarai	
2017	Mero Paisa Khoi		Rose Rana	
2017	Chhakka Panja 2	Brinda	Deepa Shree Niraula	
2017	Fateko Jutta		Nikesh Khadka	Special Appearance
2018	Mr. Jholay	Kamali	Ram Babu Gurung	
2018	Chhakka Panja 3	Brinda	Deepa Shree Niraula	Guest Appearance
2019	Chauka Dau		Purnendu Jha	
2019	Gopi	Usha	Dipendra Lama	Played the role of a vet
2019	Daal Bhat Tarkari	Jiu Sanchai	Sudan KC	
2019	Jatrai Jatra	Sampada	Pradip Bhattarai	
2019	Chha Maya Chhapakkai	Barsha	Dipendra Lama	Special Appearance
2024	Mahajatra			
2024	Tel Visa		Shankar Ghimire	
