= Samten Bhutia =

Indian film director

- Born: Samten Bhutia; 21 April 1977 (age 49); Sang, Phegyong, East Sikkim, Sikkim
- Education: Senior sec school sang, East Sikkim
- Occupations: Film director, screenwriter, cinematographer

Samten Bhutia (born 21 April 1977) is an Indian film director and writer from Sikkim. He has been actively involved in Nepalese film industry over the last decade. He recently directed Taandro which was screened at the Dhaka International film festival. His first film Latter was well received by people from Nepal and India. He also acted in a short film, Myth.

== Filmography ==
=== Director ===
- (2024) Tara: The Lost Star - feature film
- (2017) Saadhesaat - feature film
- (2016) Anaagat – feature film
- (2015) Taandro – Deciphering Me – feature film
- (2012) In Search of Nation – feature film (associate director)
- (2009) Letter (Nepal) – feature film
- (2003) Masked Fair – short film
- (2003) Naango Dhad (Sikkim) – tele film
- (2000) Naya Disha – documentary

=== Screenplay ===
- Letter (Nepali)
- Naango Dhad (Sikkim)
- Masked Fair (Sikkim)
- Luv Sab (Nepali)
- Aadha Antya (Nepali)
- Taandro (Nepali)
- Saadhesaat (Nepali)

=== Actor ===
- (2004) Mero Uthney Palo – feature film (Nepali)
- (2003) Myth – short film (English)

=== Production Design ===
- (2015) Jhumki – feature film (Nepal)
- (2012) In Search of Nation – feature film (Nepal)
