= Katha mitho sarangiko =

Katha Mitho Sarangiko (Sweet Tales of Sarangi, Nepali: कथा मीठो सारंगीको) is a weekly Nepali radio drama produced by BBC Media Action, the charity wing of the BBC. It was first broadcast in February 2008. It is improvised and, apart from the linking narration, is recorded entirely on location, mainly in rural communities in Nepal. The sarangi, mentioned in the title, is a traditional Nepali stringed instrument, played with a bow. The narrator of the drama is a sarangi player from the Gandharba caste of traditional, itinerant musicians. The drama comprises a series of tales that the narrator, Prakash Gandharba, tells as he goes about his travels. The cast varies according to the story being told; if the story is set in a rural community the majority of the roles are played by people from the community who have never acted before. The cast of story lines set in Kathmandu is predominantly made up of professional actors. The drama is rich in sound and music. It has been funded by a three different donors: UNDP, DFID and UNFPA.

Up to May 2012 Katha Mitho Sarangiko broadcast 150 episodes on the theme of gender based violence. It basically considered the changing relationship between men and women in the contemporary Nepal. Since, June 2012 KMS has started producing dramas on the theme of Good Governance.
