= Mountain River Films =

- Type: Private
- Industry: Entertainment
- Founded: Kathmandu, Nepal in 2010
- Founders: Chandra K. Jha; Dhurba Maharjan
- Headquarters: Kathmandu, Mumbai
- Products: Films; Documentaries
- Website: mountainriverfilms.com

Mountain River Films (MRF) is an independent film production and sales company headquartered in Kathmandu, Nepal. Founded by film enthusiasts Chandra K. Jha and Dhurba Maharjan in 2010, the objective of the company has been stated as "Bridging the gap between independent filmmakers of South Asian and the international market". One of its main objectives is to make unique and meaningful Nepalese films for all audiences, especially foreign film enthusiasts all over the world. As a production house, the company is associated with almost all aspects of filmmaking ranging from story development, story-script conversion and script development to pre-production, shooting and post-production work. As far as sales, the company is involved in packaging, marketing, branding, product endorsement and the sales of South Asian films to international outlets. Some prominent companies to have done business with MRF are Channel 4 (UK), Gong TV (France), DU Mobile (UAE), Mobi-Pictures (Poland), Visonteam (Serbia) and Zee TV (India). In November 2015, Mountain River Films was awarded the Best Buyer of the Year Award (Nepal region) at the Indywood Film Market held in Kochi, India.

== Films distributed ==
- Anaagat
- Teen Ghumti
- Taandro
- Salt Bridge
- Talakjung vs Tulke
- Saanghuro
- Rough Book
- Leopard Do Not Bite
- Sedmero
- Kolka Cool
- Chittagong

== Films produced ==
- Anaagat
- Taandro
- Paper
