= Sugam Pokharel =

Nepalese singer

- सुगम पाेखरेल
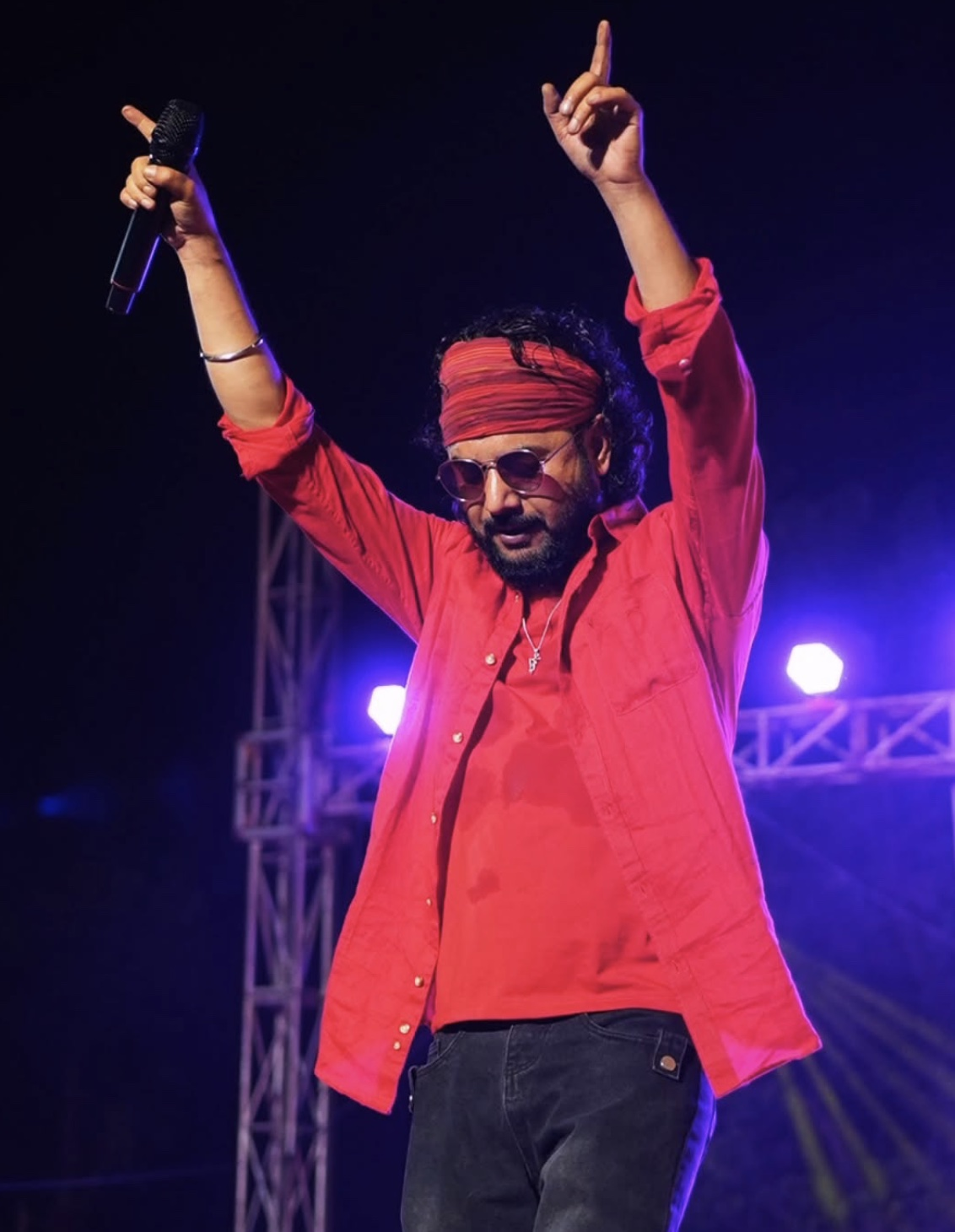
- Sugam Pokharel in 2025
- Born: September 20, 1979 (age 47); Mangalbare, Morang District.
- Occupations: Singer; Songwriter; Composer; RJ
- Years active: 1995–present
- Spouse: Liza Pokharel (m. 2002)
- Children: 1 daughter
- Relatives: Sunil Pokharel (brother)
- Musical career
- Genre: Pop
- Instruments: Vocals; Guitar
- Labels: Music.com; SAV; Stereo Records
- Website: www.sugampokharel.com.np

Sugam Pokharel (Nepali: सुगम पाेखरेल) is a Nepalese singer, music composer, songwriter, and radio jockey known for his contribution towards Nepali pop music. His first solo recording, Mero Sansaar (2001), became a top seller in Nepal. He gained recognition from the masses, particularly the youth, in the early 2000s, when pop music was not particularly popular among the general public. Because of this, he is seen as one of the most prominent figures in Nepali pop music.

== Early life career ==
Sugam Pokharel was born in Mangalbare, Morang in 1979. His father was a government scribe in the Department of Land Reform Management but was also known as an advocate in the locality. His elder brother, Sunil Pokharel is a theater artist.

After completing the School Leaving Certificate (Nepal) from Biratnagar, Sugam moved to Kathmandu for his high school education. Initially having no desire to record music as a professional singer or to pursue a career as a pop singer, he decided to record a song when he met Sudin Pokharel in Kathmandu, who was also willing to record the song. They both recorded their first song, Ma Maya Garchu at NAAD Studio, Anamnagar in 1995, which was a disaster. After their unsuccessful debut, they recorded another song four months after their first release. The second release was titled Payera Timilai Yesto Khusi Chhu, it was not successful. Although facing two of the biggest flops in their debut career, their paramount desire to record hit songs didn't halt them from recording their third song, Panchi. This also didn't do well in the market, and the collaboration between Sugam and Sudin ended.

== Radio career ==
In 1997, Sugam started working as a librarian at Radio Sagarmatha, Nepal's first community radio, after three of the biggest flops in his early singing career with Sudin Pokharel. Later on, he started hosting a musical program.

== Musical career ==
After back-to-back failures working with Sudin Pokharel a.k.a. DA69, he began his solo career with the album Shoonya (1MB), released in 2001. His first recorded song is Sayad Mero Prita. His initial songs, such as Feri Tyo Din, Kati Din Bitey, Maya Ko Baato, Samhalinchha Kaile Mann, and Timi Ma Bhanda, established him as a Pop Star. He currently has 9 Albums in his account, including Shoonya, Highway, Sutra, Sugam Yatra, School Pathshala, Sugam Song Geet, Shwyet Hansini, Tilasmi Kathmandu and Nawomi.

He often worked with Sudin Pokhrel (a.k.a. Rapper DA69) from his hometown of Biratnagar. "The Unity" band (Rapper DA69, VJ Asif Shah, Aidray) was mostly associated with him in songs like Aaja Feri Din Bityo. Girish Khatiwada, who hails from his hometown, Biratnagar, was also associated with him.

In 2012, Pokharel released Dashain Tihar festival song which was later a massive hit among the audience who was staying away from their home related to their emotions staying aboard and couldn't come back home to their loved ones in festival season. Every year this song has gathered new audience cherishing the emotional attached in the song. Since then the song was declared as Dashain Tihar festival anthem by the audiences. The video was done by Inline Creation Records and team.

He also worked as one of the three judges of the Nepali singing reality show Nepal Idol for season 4, after the original three judges from the previous three seasons were busy with another project.

== Movie Playback career ==
Sugam Pokharel has recorded numerous hit songs as a playback singer in Nepali movies. He debuted his song "K Yo Maya Ho" as playback singer from the movie Mero Euta Saathi Cha. He has also been involved in composing music and writing lyrics for films and also worked as a musical director for the movie "Maun". He has been involved in films like "Katha Kathmandu", "Ramkahani", "Kaira", "Kohalpur Express", "Aishwarya", "A Mero Hajur 2", "Ma Yesto Geet Gaauchu", "Saayad 2", "Karkhana", "Nai Nabhannu La 4", "Prem Geet", "Woda Number 6", and "Hostel".

== Albums ==
List of Music Albums
Year	Album
2001	Shoonya (1MB)
2003	Highway
2004	Sutra
2006	Sugam Yaatra
2008	School Pathsala
2014	Sugam SongGeet
2020	Shwyet Hansini
2022	Tilasmi Kathmandu
2024	Nawomi

== Sugam Pokharel & The BajaGaja ==
Sugam Pokharel & The Bajagaja is a professional Nepali live band formed in 2017 by one of Nepal’s most recognized pop vocalists, Sugam Pokharel.

Bajagaja Current Band Members:

- Dinesh Thapa (Guitarist: 2018-Present)
- Manik Baniya (Bassist: 2023-Present)
- Shailendra M Pradhan "Babu" (Keyboardist: 2026-Present)
- Saujanya Sthapit (Guitarist: 2026-Present)
- Haven Singh (Drummer: 2025-Present)

== Awards ==
List of awards and nominations
Year	Ceremony	Category	Result
2003	Close Up Hits F.M Music Award	Best New Artist of the Year	Won
2003	Close Up Hits F.M Music Award	Best Male Vocal Pop	Won
2018	11th Anniversary of Radio Kantipur "Radio Rastrako"	Top 1 Pop Singer	Won
2018	11th Anniversary of Radio Kantipur "Radio Rastrako"	Album of the Year "School Pathashala"	Won
2018	Sagarmatha Music Awards	Best Playback Singer of the Year	Nominated
2018	20th Radio Kantipur National Music Awards	Playback Singer (Male) - Pal Pal	Won
2018	Cine Circle Award	Best Playback Singer (Male) - Ma Yesto Geet Gaunchhu	Won
2021	Natikaji National Music Award	Best Singer	Won
