= Gopi (2019 film) =

2019 Nepalese film directed by Dipendra Lama

- Directed by: Dipendra Lama
- Screenplay by: Samipya Raj Timalsena
- Story by: Dipendra Lama
- Produced by: Shreedhar Poudel; Aarohi Kc
- Starring: Bipin Karki; Barsha Raut; Surakshya Panta
- Edited by: Nimesh Shrestha
- Music by: Arjun Pokharel
- Production company: Aarohi Entertainment
- Distributed by: OSR Digital; MeroFilm
- Release date: 1 February 2019
- Country: Nepal
- Language: Nepali

Gopi (Nepali:गोपी) is a 2019 drama film, directed by Dipendra Lama. The film is written by Samipya Raj Timalsena and produced by Aarohi K.C. made under the banner of Aarohi Entertainment. The film stars Bipin Karki, Barsha Raut and Surakshya Panta in the lead roles. The film is about a man named Gopi who struggles to pursue his dreams.

The film was released on 1 February 2019.

== Plot ==
Gopi (Bipin Karki) is a lecturer in local college. Simultaneously he runs a cow farm. His father has a dream to settle down in US. For this, Gopi has to apply first, but Gopi wants to stay in Nepal. He gives continuity to his milk business.

== Cast ==
- Bipin Karki as Gopi
- Barsha Raut as Vet
- Surakshya Panta

== Production ==
Khagendra Lamichhane was set for the lead role in the film but he would drop out of the project. The lead actress Barsha Siwakoti would drop the project. Bipin Karki and Barsha Raut replaced Lamichhane and Siwakoti. Photography for the Gopi begun in August 2018. Most of the scenes of the film were shot in Tokha, Kathmandu. Few scenes were shot in Patalekhet, Kavre.

== Soundtrack ==
No.	Title	Lyrics	Music	Singer(s)	Length
1.	"Laxmi Kahile Kaali"	Buddhi Sagar	Arjun Pokharel	Dhruba Bisco, Anjila Regmi	4:41
2.	"Tero Aafno"	Viplob Pratik	Kalyan Singh	Shiva Pariyar	5:28

== Awards ==
Year	Award	Category	Recipient	Result	Ref(s)
2019	National Film Awards	Best Film	Gopi	Won	
2019	National Film Awards	Best Writer	Dipendra Lama, Samipya Raj Timalsena	Won	
2019	Kamana Film Awards	Best Actor in a Leading Role (Male)	Bipin Karki	Nominated	
2019	Kamana Film Awards	Best Story	Dipendra Lama	Nominated	
2019	Kamana Film Awards	Best Lyricist	Biplop Pratik	Nominated	
