= Fateko Jutta =

- Directed by: Nikesh Khadka
- Produced by: Arjun Kumar
- Starring: Saugat Malla; Priyanka Karki; Kameshwor Chaurasiya; Rabindra Jha
- Cinematography: Niraj Kandel
- Music by: Shankar Thapa; Prabesh Malik
- Production company: Arjun Kumar Films
- Release date: 3 November 2017
- Running time: 2h 16m
- Country: Nepal
- Language: Nepali

Fateko Jutta is a 2017 Nepali drama and comedy film directed by Bikash Sharma and produced by Arjun Kumar. The film stars Saugat Malla, Priyanka Karki, Kameshwor Chaurasiya and Rabindra Jha in lead roles. The film was released on November 3, 2017.

== Cast ==
- Saugat Malla
- Priyanka Karki
- Kameshwor Chaurasiya
- Rabindra Jha
