= Robin Tamang =

Nepalese singer (1961–2023)

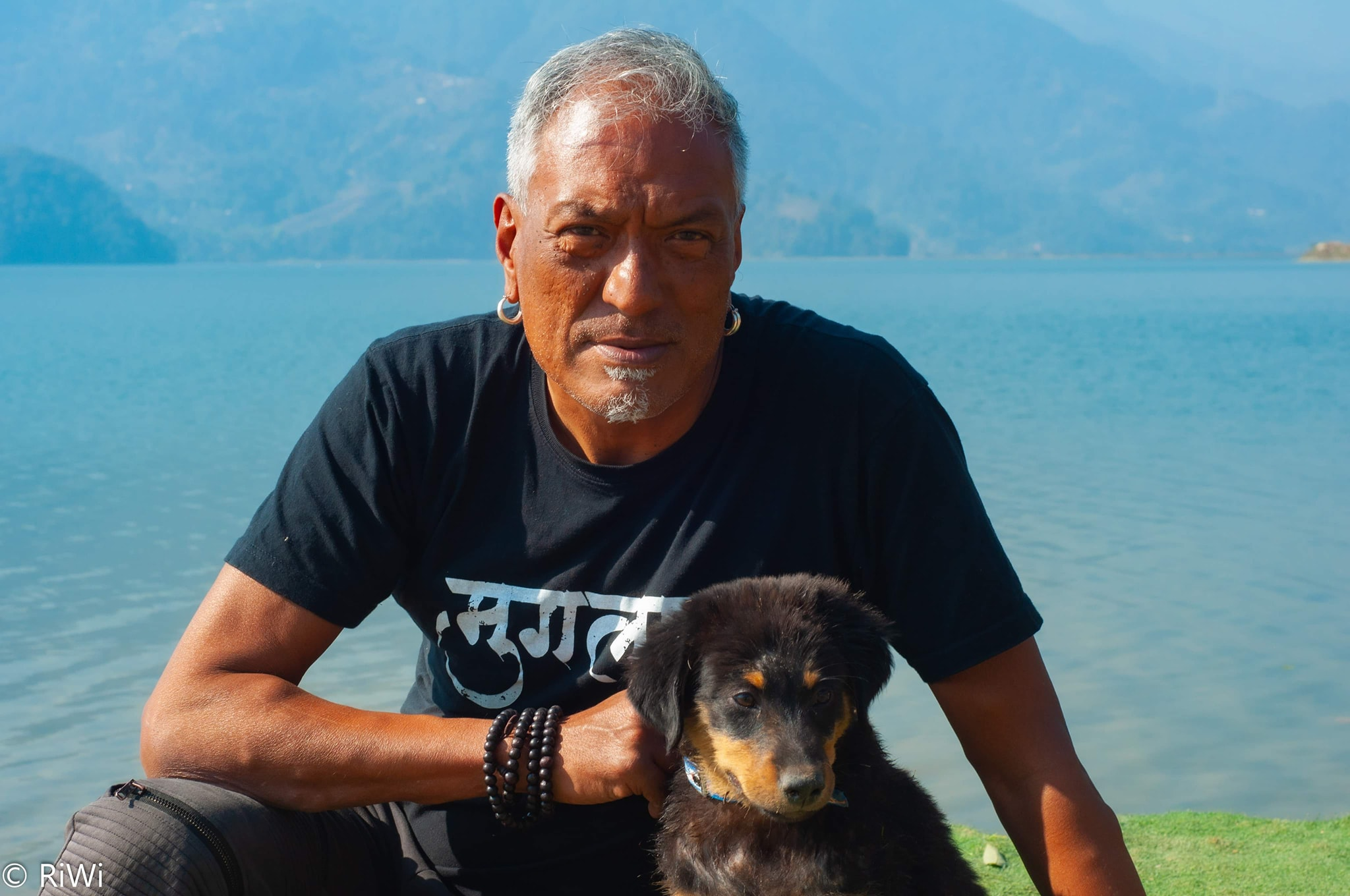

Background information
- Born: Robin Tamang; 1963; Singapore
- Died: 4 July 2023 (aged 60) Budhanilkantha, Nepal
- Genres: Rock, hard rock
- Occupations: Singer, musician, actor
- Years active: 1996–2023

Robin Tamang (1968 – 4 July 2023) was a Nepalese singer, musician, actor and founder of rock band Robin and The New Revolution. He was also an actor, and has acted in various Nepalese films. He was well-known for playing the character of Yama Nadu in the Amazon Prime series, The Last Hour.

== Personal life ==
Born in Singapore, Robin was the youngest of five siblings born to a family that was active in the British Army. Due to his father being posted in various locations throughout his childhood, Robin lived in Hong Kong, Singapore and Brunei during that time.

During his schooling in Singapore, he was inspired by Jimi Hendrix and Deep Purple. In the mid-1980s while he studied at Humber College in Toronto, he formed his second band Tamang and performed in various places.

In 1996, he returned to Nepal to live in Pokhara at his father's place, and joined forces with a blues-rock band from Kathmandu, Looza and formed 'Robin n Looza'. Robin n Looza recorded three albums and after performing with them for several years, Looza eventually disbanded in 2005.

After parting ways with Looza, Robin teamed up with another band, 'The New Revolution' to form Robin and The New Revolution. They continued making records and playing live until his demise.

Tamang was found dead at his residence in Budhanilkantha on 4 July 2023, at the age of 60.

== Albums ==
Robin n Looza:

- Nepal
- Bhulma Bhulyo
- Aadhunik Aaganma

Robin and The New Revolution:

- Keta Keti
- 13000
- Hamro Desh
- Muglan

== Songs ==
SN	Song	Music By	Lyrics By	Genre	Band
1	Adhunik Ko Aagamanma	Robin Tamang		Rock	Robin & Looza
2	All About	Robin Tamang		Rock	Robin & The New Revolution
3	Birata ko Chino	Robin Tamang	Robin Tamang	Rock	
4	Dum Maro Dum	Robin Tamang		Rock	Robin & The New Revolution
5	Free World	Robin Tamang		Rock	Robin & Looza
6	I Can Hear	Robin Tamang		Rock	Robin & Looza
7	Kalpana	Robin Tamang		Rock	Robin & The New Revolution
8	Keta Keti	Robin Tamang		Rock	Robin & The New Revolution
9	Maila Bhai	Robin Tamang		Rock	Robin & Looza
10	Maya Deu Dhoka Na Deu	Raman Singh Robin Tamang	Nabin K Bhattarai	Pop	
11	Mero Maya	Rabin Tamang		Rock	Robin & Looza
12	Patan	Robin Tamang		Rock	Robin & The New Revolution
13	Stary Stary Night	Robin Tamang		Rock	Robin & Looza
14	Thikai Cha	Robin Tamang		Rock	Robin & Looza
