= Bahuni =

Village development committee in Kosi Zone, Nepal

Bahuni बाहुनी
- Village development committee
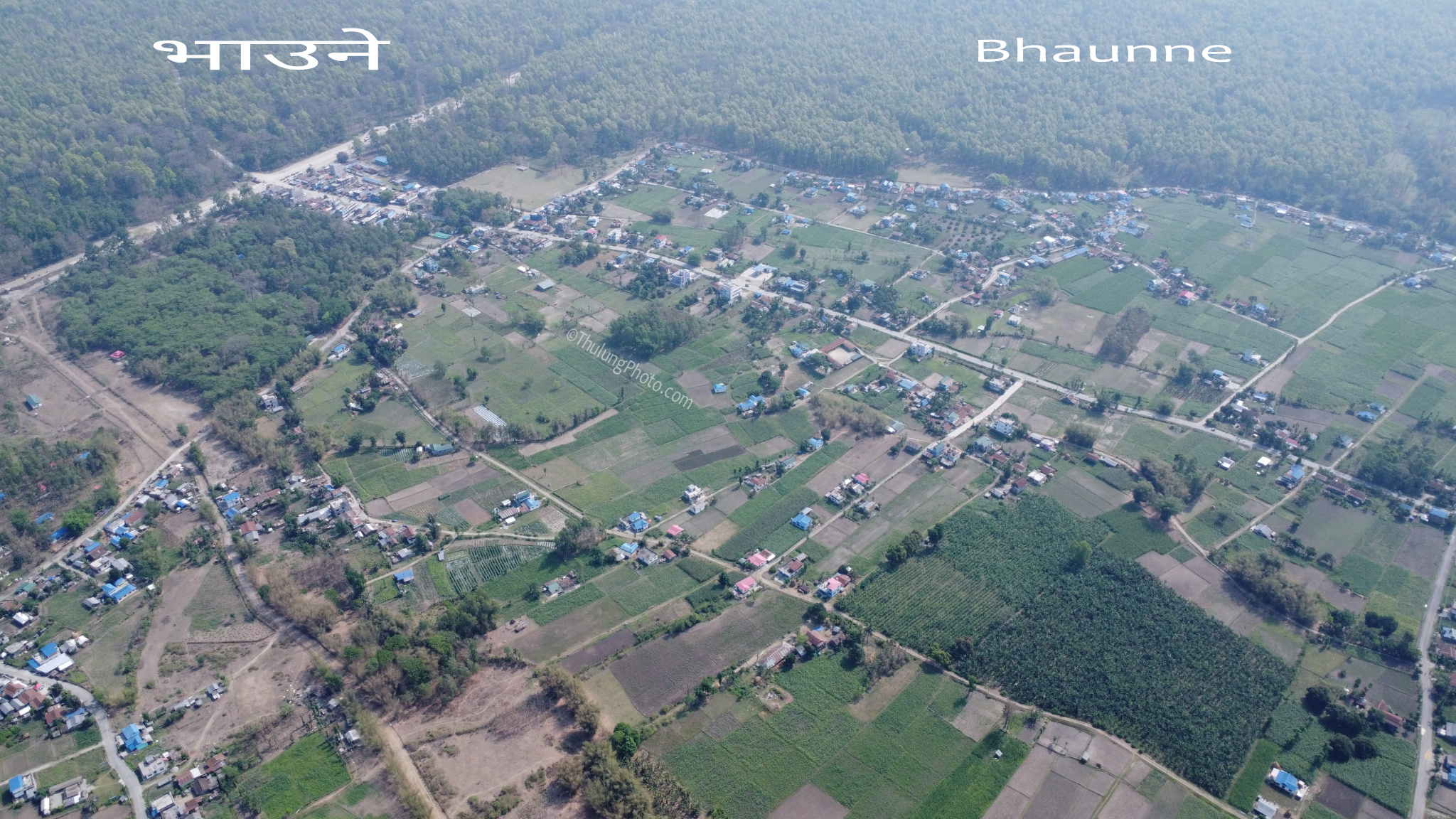
- Aerial shot of Bahuni

- Location in Nepal
- Coordinates: 26.58°N 87.46°E
- Country: Nepal
- Zone: Kosi Zone
- District: Morang District

Population (1991)
  - Total: 11,184
- Time zone: UTC+5:45 (Nepal Time)

Bahuni was a village development committee in Morang District in the Kosi Zone of south-eastern Nepal. At the time of the 1991 Nepal census it had a population of 11,184 people living in 2114 individual households.
