= Sunil Pokharel =

Nepali theatre artist and director

- सुनील पोखरेल
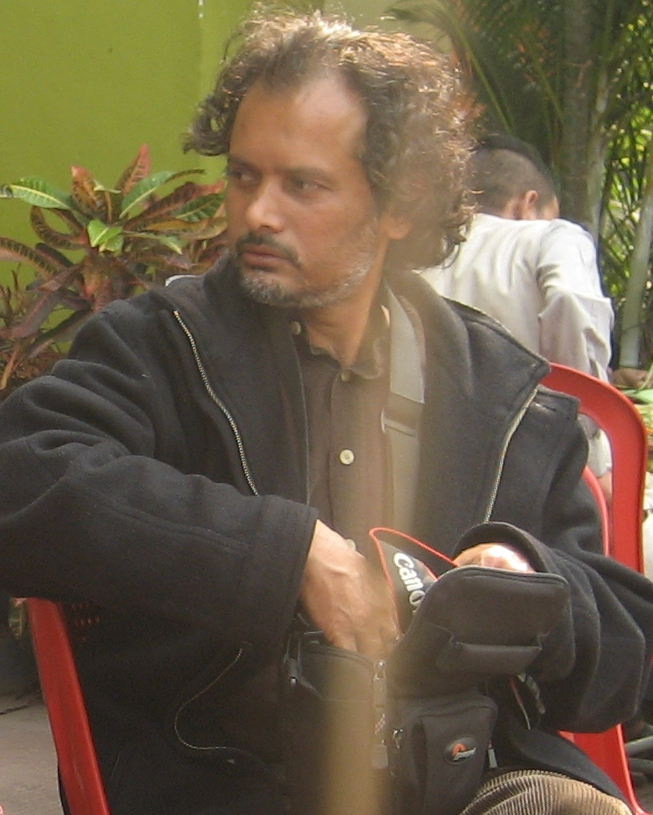
- Born: 16 June 1963 (age 63); Noula, Khotang District, Nepal
- Education: National School of Drama, India
- Notable work: Putaliko Ghar, Agniko Katha, Yajnaseni
- Spouse: Nisha Sharma
- Relatives: Sugam Pokharel (brother)
- Awards: National Talent Award

Sunil Pokharel (Nepali: सुनील पोखरेल; born on 16 June 1963) is a Nepalese theatre artist and director. He is considered one of the pioneers of modern Nepali theatre. He is a graduate of National School of Drama, India (1987). He has directed more than four dozens of varied Nepali, Indian and European plays.

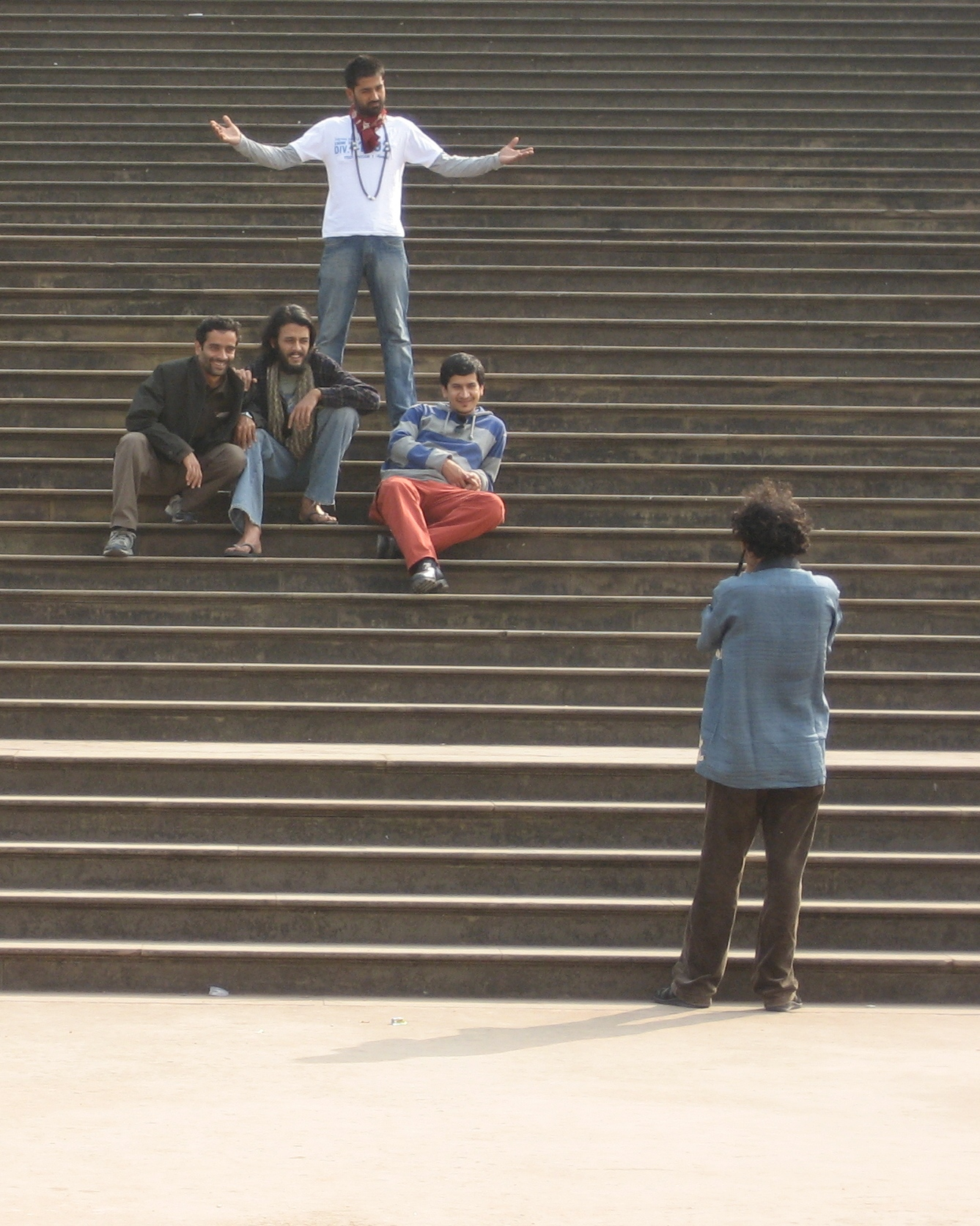
Sunil Pokharel taking pictures of his students cum actors Praveen Khatiwada, Kamalmani Nepal, Bibhooshan Basnet and Rabindra Singh Baniya during a theater festival in Barahampore, India in 2009.

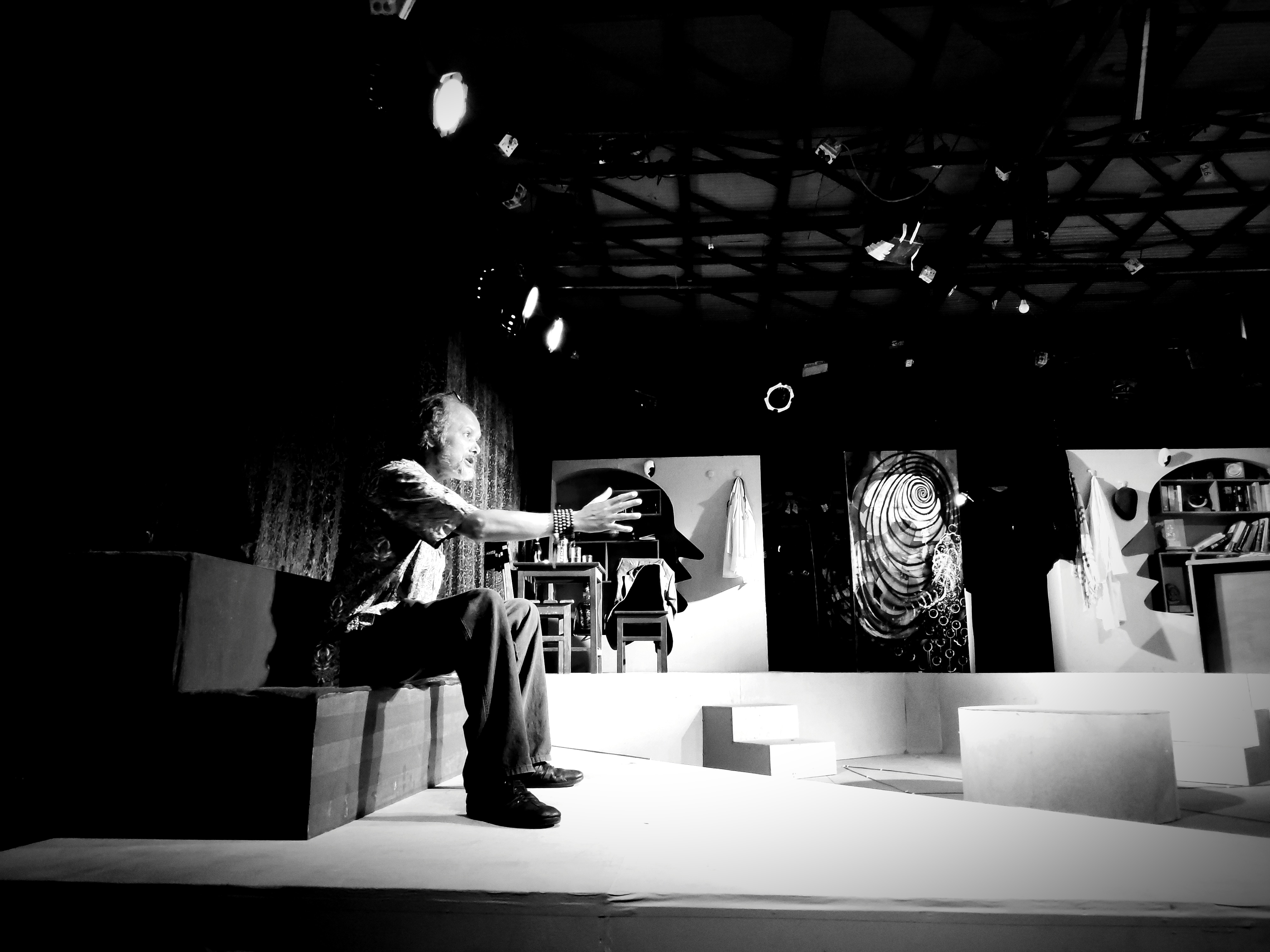
Sunil Pokharel on Stage

== Early life ==
Sunil Pokharel was born in Noula village, in Khotang District in Nepal on 16 June 1963 as the first child of his parents. When he was an adolescent, his family moved to Mangalbare in Morang district, near Biratnagar. He completed his school education from Gograha Higher Secondary School in Biratnagar.

== Education ==
Pokhrel got a scholarship to study at National School of Drama (NSD) in New Delhi, India in 1984. He earned his diploma in drama from this Indian government owned institution.

== Career ==
Sunil Pokharel started his career as a theatre artist at the age of thirteen, when he was in School. In initial days, he worked with artist and director Badri Adhikari and Ramesh Budhathoki in Biratnagar. Later, he moved to Kathmandu and worked in guidance of veteran Nepali theater artist Harihar Sharma. While working in Kathmandu, Pokharel got a scholarship to study at National School of Drama (NSD) in New Delhi, India., After returning from his study in NSD, Pokharel established Aarohan Gurukul, the first drama school in the country. He is the artistic director of Aarohan Theatre Group and Principle of Gurukul: school of theatre.

== Family ==
Sunil Pokhrel is the elder brother of Nepalese pop singer Sugam Pokhrel. He and Badri Adhikari met Nisha Sharma while she was still at school. They had cast her sister as the lead in their production and they wanted a girl to play her sister. Nisha was cast despite her sister's worries that the job would distract her from her studies. Nisha became a successful actor, the chancellor of an acting academy (and his wife).

== Major works ==
=== As a director ===
- Agniko Katha - by Abhi Subedi
- Yajnaseni - by Suman Pokhrel
- Mayadeviko Sapana - by Abhi Subedi
- Putaliko Ghar - (Nepali translation of Henrik Ibsen's A Doll's House)
- Nyayapremi - (Nepali translation of Albert Camus's Les Justes)
- Midnait Samar Sapana - (Nepali translation of William Shakespeare's A Midsummer Night's Dream)
- Jayamaya Aaphu Matra Lekhapani Aaipugi (Based on a story of same title by Indra Bahadur Rai)
- Hariyo Dhunga (Based on a story of same title by Upendra Subba)
- Arko Artha Nagalema (Based on newspaper articles written by Sharat Chandra Wasti and published in Kantipur Daily)

=== As an actor ===
- Putaliko Ghar - (Nepali translation of Henrik Ibsen's A Doll's House with Nisha Sharma as Nora)
- Jaat Sodhnu Jogiko - (Nepali translation of Vijay Tendulkar's Jāt Hi Poochho Sādhu Ki)
- Nyayapremi - (Nepali translation of Albert Camus's Les Justes)
- Khariko Ghero - (Nepali translation of Bertolt Brecht's The Caucasian Chalk Circle)
- Idamitham - by Sarubhakta

=== As a translator ===
- Translation of the play A Doll's House by Henrik Ibsen in Nepali as Putaliko Ghar

== Awards ==
- National Talent Award conferred by Government of Nepal
