= Jatrai Jatra =

Nepalese comedy thriller film

- Directed by: Pradip Bhattarai
- Written by: Rhythm Paudel
- Produced by: Uday Shree Suman; Singe Lama; Sudin Bikram Thapa (Executive Producer)
- Starring: Bipin Karki; Rabindra Jha; Rabindra Singh Baniya; Dayahang Rai; Barsha Raut
- Cinematography: Srijan Pandu
- Edited by: Kishun Shrestha
- Music by: Songs: Kali Prasad Baskota; Krishna Bhardwaj; Score: Rohit Shakya; Shailesh Shrestha
- Production company: Shatkon Arts
- Distributed by: Station 5 (Kathmandu); FD (Nepal)
- Release date: 17 May 2019 (Nepal)
- Country: Nepal
- Language: Nepali
- Budget: रु 1.7 crore
- Box office: रु 11.9 crore

Jatrai Jatra (Nepali: जात्रै जात्रा) is a 2019 Nepalese comedy thriller film, directed by Pradip Bhattarai and written by Rhythm Paudel. Rhythm Paudel has played a huge role developing this film. The film is produced by Pawan Shrestha, Rhythm Paudel, N Pun and Sudin Bikram Thapa under the banner of Shatkon Arts. The film stars Bipin Karki, Dayahang Rai, Rabindra Singh Baniya, Rabindra Jha, Madhu Paudel and Barsha Raut in the lead roles. The film is the sequel and follow up of 2016 Heist comedy Jatra released on 2016. The film deals aftermath life of Fanindra, Munna and Joyes after they get released from jail on bail and also the consequences after they find bag of gold. In 2024, a sequel to this film, Mahajatra, was released.

== Plot ==
The first film ended with Fanindra Timilsina (Bipin Karki), Joyes (Rabindra Singh Baniya), and Munna (Rabindra Jha) being arrested for possessing a bag full of counterfeit money. In the sequel, they've been found innocent and released from custody after two years. But finding a job is difficult out in the real world. Munna is kicked out of his barber shop; Joyes cannot find the love of his life and somehow ends up in a job delivering oxygen tanks; and Fanindra needs to find a better life for his wife Sampada (Barsha Raut) and son Iman (Arbein Khadka). Fanindra tries different jobs, finally ending up as a taxi driver to a Brahmin sahu (Rajaram Paudel).

One day, Fanindra's taxi is ransacked by goons while driving a rowdy customer, Dawa (Daya Hang Rai). The gangsters kidnap Dawa but a crateful of chicken that Dawa was carrying is left behind. These chicken turn out to be hiding gold biscuits. Fanindra decides he wants to keep the gold, but the goons are obviously looking for it. So Fanindra and his friends must now protect the gold and themselves.

== Cast ==
- Bipin Karki as Phadindra dra Timsina/Pharen
- Dayahang Rai as Dawa
- Rabindra Singh Baniya as Joyesh
- Rabindra Jha as Munna
- Barsha Raut as Sampada/Sampu, Phdindra's Wife
- Prem Pandey as Jawai of Sampada
- Rajaram Paudel as Pandit
- Master Arbien Khadka as Iman, son of Phadindra and Sampada
- Priyanka Jha as the wife of Munna

== Reception ==
The film received mixed responses from critics with praise for its performances, twist and turns and proper sequel storyline of the film but unnecessary events shown in the film and predictability was criticized. The film has earned around रु 11 crores, emerging as a success at the box office.

The Annapurna Express rated it 2.5 out of 5 stars, and stated: "Jatrai Jatrai feels like the makers hurried a bit too much to recreate the success of the original Jatra and in doing so, left too many loose ends."
