= Shushank Mainali =

Nepalese film actor and producer (born 1980)

- शुशांक मैनाली
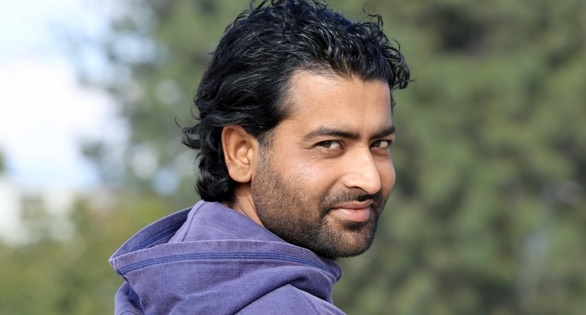
- Born: June 2, 1980 (age 45); Kathmandu, Nepal
- Citizenship: Nepali
- Occupation: Film Producer
- Years active: 2000-present
- Awards: Best Actor, Festival Of Globe( FOG ) Awards- 2015, Best Film (Silver Medal), SAARC Film Festival- 2014, Best Actor, National Film Award- 2013, Best Film, National Film Award- 2013

Shushank Mainali (Nepali: शुशांक मैनाली) is a Nepalese film actor and producer. His film Talakjung vs Tulke was selected as Nepal's official entry to the 88th Academy Awards in the best foreign language film category.

== Early career ==
Shushank began his career appearing in small roles and cameos in Nepali serials, music videos and films before his role as the main leading actor in the film Saanghuro. Saanghuro was also telecasted on British television Channel 4.

== Filmography ==
- Saanghuro (2013)
- Talakjung vs Tulke (2014)
- Santras (2014)
- Ko Aafno (2015)
- Junge (2015)
