= Anaagat =

- Official Poster
- Directed by: Samten Bhutia
- Produced by: Samir Upadhyay, Samten Bhutia, Chandra K. Jha; Nilu Doma Sherpa
- Starring: Priyanka Karki; Arpan Thapa; Praween Khatiwada
- Production company: Mountain River Films
- Distributed by: Mountain River Films
- Release date: 25 January 2019
- Country: Nepal
- Language: Nepali

Anaagat (Nepali: अनागत) is a 2019 Nepali language psychological thriller directed by Samten Bhutia and produced by Mountain River Films and Tiny but Big Pictures Production. The seed for the film was sown when Chandra K. Jha, who went on to become one of the producers of the film, pitched his story idea to Samten Bhutia. In subsequent meetings between the two of them and Prabachan Shrestha, the screenwriter, the story took shape quickly and a full-fledged screenplay followed soon after. Even at this early stage, there was a unanimous opinion that the leading roles of Kriti and Suresh should be played by actors Priyanka Karki and Arpan Thapa, respectively. When the story was pitched to the actors, they immediately agreed to come on board.

Story revolves around Suresh (Arpan Thapa) who is an amateur artist who is married to Kriti (Priyanka Karki), an outspoken and brash housewife. Together with their seven-year- old son Suvid (Rosin Subedi), they seem to lead a normal life. This normality includes arguments regarding the household finances and the separate, independent lives the couple lead. Things start to take a serious turn when Suresh discovers that Kriti is hiding things from him. Suresh’s best friend Jayant is of the belief that Kriti is untrustworthy and is most probably having an affair. When Kriti’s ex is brutally murdered, Jayant firmly believes that Kriti is involved in this crime. Though Suresh is not convinced of this initially, events start to unfold that firmly lead him to believe that the mother of his son is trying to kill him.

== Cast ==
- Priyanka Karki as Kriti
- Arpan Thapa as Suresh
- Rosin Subedi as Suvid
- Praween Khatiwada
