= Pradip Bhattarai =

Nepalese film director and screenwriter

- प्रदिप भट्टराइ
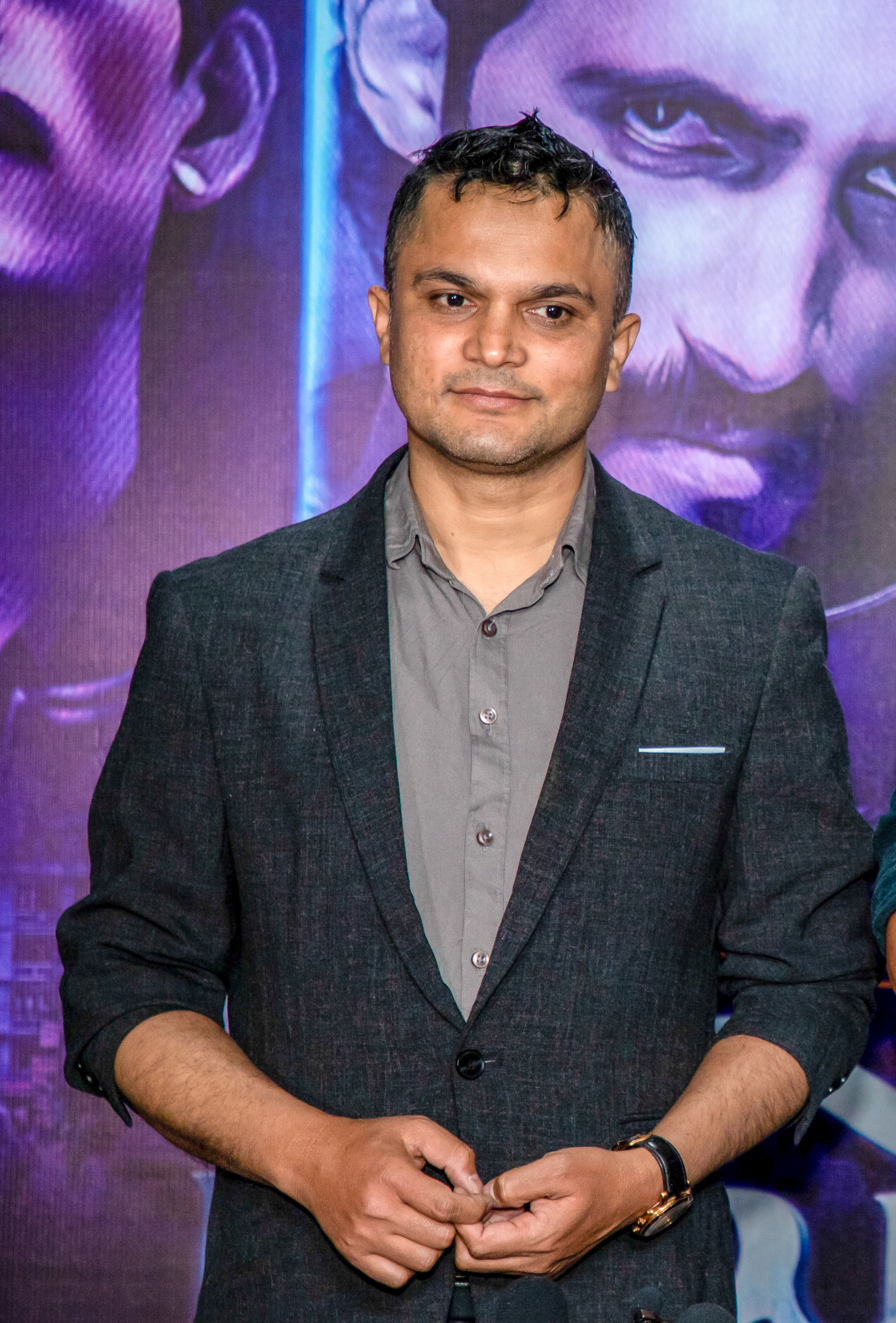
- Pradip Bhattarai in 2022
- Born: 6 August 1983 (age 43); Janakapur, Sarlahi, Nepal
- Occupations: Director; screenwriter
- Years active: 2016–present

Pradip Bhattarai (Nepali: प्रदिप भट्टराइ; also spelled Pradeep) is a Nepalese screenwriter and film director. He made his directorial debut in 2016 with the film Jatra. It was a heist-comedy film which was produced by Singe Lama and Yadav Poudel under the banner of Shatkon Arts. The film was commercially successful. Since then he directed two other films, Shatru Gate in 2018, and Jatrai Jatra in 2019, both of which were commercially successful. Bhattarai is also one of the judges of the first Nepali comedy-reality TV show Comedy Champion. He has been associated with renowned Nepali comic actors Maha Jodi since the early 2000s.

== Early life ==
Bhattarai was born on 6 August 1983 in Sarlahi.

== Filmography ==
Key

†	Denotes films that have not yet been released

Year	Film	Director	Writer	Notes	Ref(s)
2016	Jatra	Yes	Yes	Directorial debut film	
2018	Shatru Gate	Yes	Yes		
2019	Jatrai Jatra	Yes	Yes		
2022	Mahapurush	Yes	Yes		
2024	Mahajatra	Yes	Yes		

== Awards ==
Year	Award	Category	Film	Result	Ref(s)
2018	Kamana Film Awards 2074	Best Screenplay	Jatra	Won	
2018	Cine Circle Awards 2074	Best Film	Jatra	Won	
2018	Cine Circle Awards 2074	Best Director	Jatra	Won	
2018	Cine Circle Awards 2074	Best Screenplay	Jatra	Won	
2019	Kamana Film Awards 2075	Best Screenplay	Shatru Gate	Won	
2019	Kamana Film Awards 2075	Best Dialogue	Shatru Gate	Won	
