= List of Nepalese films of 2016 =

== Releases ==
=== January ===
Release date	Film	Genre	Director	Cast	Notes	Ref
Jan 1/Poush 24	Bagamati	Action	Sunny Kerala	Rajesh Hamal	Directed by South Indian director	
Jan 15/Magh1	Fanko	Suspense	Shubarna Thapa	Saugat Malla, Keki Adhikari, Dayahang Rai, Priyanka Karki		
Jan 15/Magh1	Kafal Pakyo	Melodrama	Sabitri Khatri	Jiwan Luitel, Barsha Raut, Mukesh Acharya		
Jan 29/Magh 15	Pashupati Prasad	Social Satire	Dipendra K Khanal	Khagendra Lamichhane, Barsha Siwakoti	Blockbuster, Positive review, won 7 awards	

=== February ===
Release date	Film	Genre	Director	Cast	Notes	Ref
Feb 5 /Magh 22	Kaifiyat	Melodrama	Dasharat Giri	Nandita K.C, Nabin Shrestha, CP Poudel, Shankar Shahi Thakuri, Kishan Sunuwar, Sajana Thapa		
12 Feb/Magh 29	Classic (Nepali movie)	Lovestory	Dinesh Raut	Aaryan Sigdel, Namrata Shrestha, Dayahang Rai, Priyanka Karki	Bagged awards for best actor female and male	
12 Feb/Magh 29	Prem Geet (2016)	Love story, Comedy				
7 Falgun, Feb 19	The Soldier |Action |B.S.Balami |Rajendra Chaudhary, Diwash Upreti, Jenisha KC |Action film concerning wildlife preservation |					

=== March ===
Release date	Film	Genre	Director	Cast	Notes	Ref
21 Falgun, March 4	Dreams (2016 film)	Lovestory	Diwakar Bhattarai	Anmol K.C., Samragyee RL Shah	Blockbuster, Bhuwan Kc debut production	

=== April ===
Release date	Film	Genre	Director	Cast	Notes	Ref
8 April/Chaitra 26	Nai navannu la 4	Family Drama	Bikash Raj Acharya	Priyanka Karki, Paul Shah, Barsha Raut		
22 April /Baishakh 11	Baato muniko phool 2	Social satire				

=== May ===
Release date	Film	Genre	Director	Cast	Notes	Ref
May 27	Best Frenz Forever	Friendship	Utsav Thapaliya	Saurav Chaudhary, Manish Neupane Sandip Ghimire, Pinky Sherpa, Sadhana Bhandari, Syaleen Manandhar, Prahik NeupaneInzamam Ali Khan		
May 27/Jesth 14	Dying Candle	Drama, Family	Naresh Kumar	Saugat Malla, Arpan Thapa, Srijana Subba	Won Best Cinematography in Queens world Film Festival and Peace award in Cinema Verde Film Festival	

=== June ===
Release date	Film	Genre	Director	Cast	Notes	Ref
June 10 /Jesth 28	Gajalu	Love story, Social satire	Hemraj Bc	Anmol K.C., Shristi Shrestha, Gaurav Pahari	Based on Kumari Pratha	
June 24	Lukamari	Suspense	ShreeRam Dahal	Saugat Malla, Karma Shakya, Rista Basnet, Subarna Karki	Based on Khyati Shrestha murder case of 2009	

=== July ===
Release date	Film	Genre	Director	Cast	Notes	Ref
22 July	Ma ta timrooi hoon	Teen love/Family Drama	Shreeram Mahat	Jyotsna Yogi, Aakash Shrestha	Comeback film of Sushmita K.C., Produced by Anmol K.C.	

=== August ===
Release date	Film	Genre	Director	Cast	Notes	Ref
aug 5 /Shrawan 21	Ekpal	Love story	Raj Shakya	Jenisha K.c, Ram Maharjan		
aug 5 /Shrawan 21	Reli mai	Drama, Comedy	Rim Bishwokarma	Sanjog Rana, Purnima Lama, Ryan Lama, Dhan Bor Bamjam (DB), Sanjay Karki, Surbeer Pandit Bharat Puri		
aug 5 /Shrawan 21	Suntali lai bhagae lagyo jhilke le	Drama, Comedy	Rishi Raj Acharya	Sushant Karki, Sushil Sitaula Shishir Bhandari Surajani KC Riza Bhushal Sushil Pokhrel RAshmi Bhatta Sarishma Magar Bishal Pahadi Sandesh Magarati Sanjaya Khatri Nutchheman Dangol Ira Bhattarai Lalit Bista .		
Aug 18 /Bhadra 2	Chapali height 2	Romantic Thriller	Dipendra K Khanal	Ayushman Joshi, Paramita Rana, Mariska Pokharel	Sequel of Chapali Height	

=== September ===
Release date	Film	Genre	Director	Cast	Notes	Ref
Sep 2/Bhadra 17	The Winner (2016)	Action	Hikmat Bista	Malina Joshi, Manchin Shakya, Mahesh Man Shrestha	Action-based revenge film	
Sep 9/Bhadra 24	Chhakka Panja	Comedy	Deepa Shree Niraula	Priyanka Karki, Deepak Raj Giri, Jeetu Nepal, Kedar Ghimire, Buddhi Tamang, Shivahari Paudel, Barsha Raut and Namrata Sapkota	One of highest-grossing films of Nepal	
Sep 16/Bhadra 31	Gaatho	Art	Suraj Bhusal	Najir Hussain, Abhaya Baral, Namrata Shrestha	Based on Social Phobia	
Sep 23	Jhumkee	Suspense	Apil Bista	Manoj RC, Malina Joshi, Rishma Gurung, Dayahang Rai,	Film on Women Violence	

=== October ===
Bhadra 24	Chhakka Panja	Comedy	Dipa Sri Niroula	Dipak raj Giri, Jitu Nepal, Kedar Ghimire, Buddhi Tamang, Shivari Paudel, Namrata Sapkota, Priyanka Karki	Blockbuster of 2073 BS - 2016 AD	Ref

=== November ===
Release date	Film	Genre	Director	Cast	Notes	Ref
Nov 11	Junga Bahadur ko coat	Action	Aashish Bhetwal	Bimlesh Adhikari, Anup Baral, Suchitra Acharya	Suspense thriller	
