= Pride celebrations in Nepal =

Annual LGBT events in Nepal

Throughout the year, different organizations host pride parades in Nepal. Blue Diamond Society, an LGBT rights organization, in 2010 organized Gai Jatra Gay March, with most participants wearing masks to prevent being identified by suspected homophobic people. In later years, pride events were held at different times of the year. Following criticism of Blue Diamond Society for aligning pride events with the Gaijatra, several organizations began organizing separate rallies instead. All the parades by Blue Diamond Society have coincided with the Gaijatra festival. The parades end with candle-light vigils in memory of those who died in the past year, promoting equality for all.

== Nepal Pride Parade ==
Nepal POMSOGIESC (People of Marginalized Sexual Orientation, Gender Identity and Sex Characteristics) Pride Parade, known as Nepal Pride Parade in short (Maithili: 𑒢𑒹𑒣𑒰𑒪 𑒑𑒾𑒩𑒫 𑒨𑒰𑒞𑓂𑒩𑒰; Newar: 𑐣𑐾𑐥𑐵𑑅 𑐐𑐬𑑂𑐧𑐫𑐵𑑅; Tamang: ནེ་པལ་ རང་ཏང་ ཡུལ་ཀོར་།།; Gurung: नेपाल ङ्होईल्वुबये भ्रज्ञाँ / नेपाल ल्हुब्ये प्रबक्याँ; Limbu: ᤏᤣᤐᤠᤗ ᤜᤣᤴᤇᤠᤶ ᤋᤱᤏᤠᤔ), is organized on every second Saturday of June. The Pride March is organized by Queer Youth Group in collaboration with Queer Rights Collective. Since 2020, Campaign for Change (intersex rights organization) has also been involved. This Pride March is the first pride march in Nepal. While many other LGBT marches existed around the year, this has become the first pride march celebrated on pride month. The first parade drew around four hundred people on the busy streets of Maitighar Mandala. The first pride march was organized on June 29, 2019, which declared second Saturday of June to be celebrated as Pride Day in Nepal.

Nepal Pride Parade
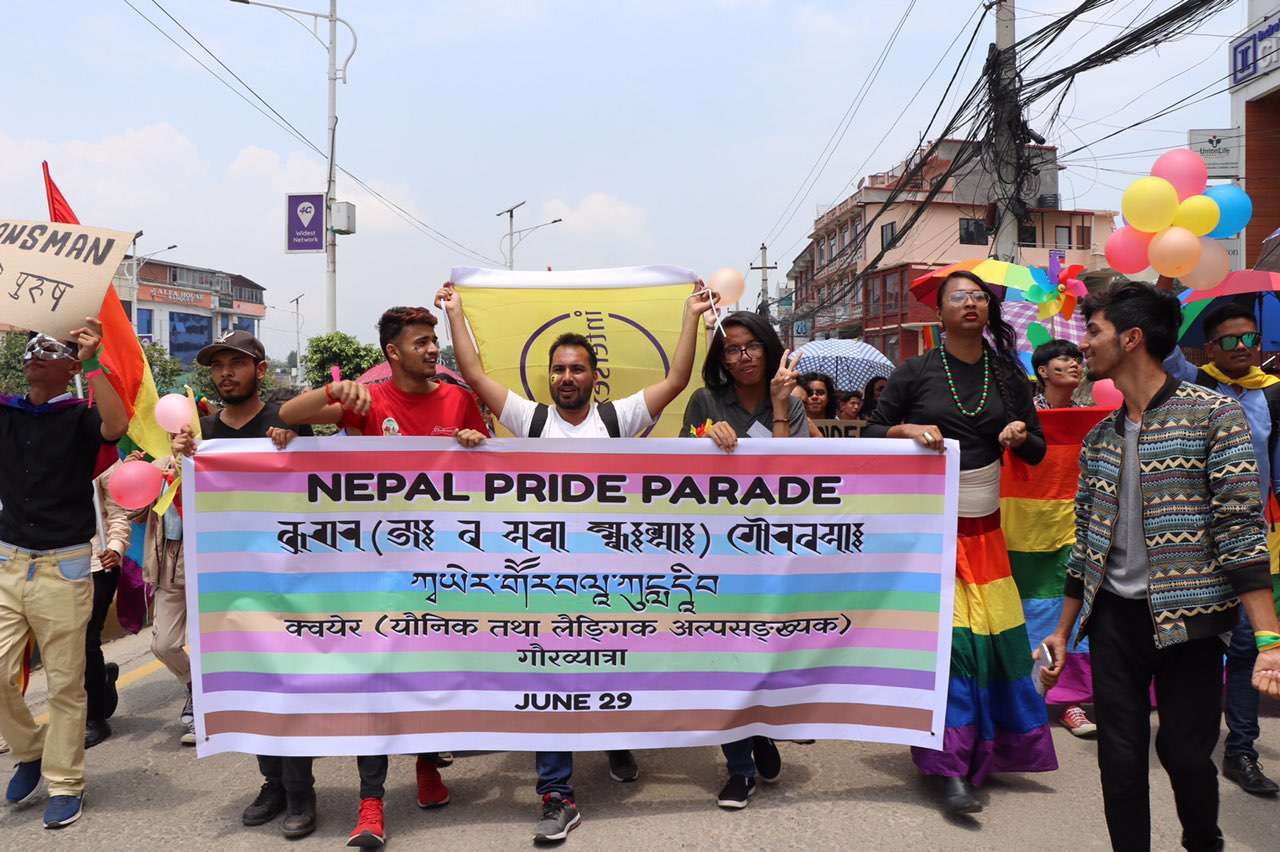
- The first ever Pride March in Nepal
- Status: active
- Genre: Pride Parade
- Frequency: Annual, Second Saturday of June
- Location: Kathmandu
- Inaugurated: June 29, 2019, the other day of the Stonewall Riot anniversary
- Previous event: 2021 June 12
- Next event: 2022 June 11
- Organizer: Queer Youth Group and Queer Rights Collective
- Website: www.nepalprideparade.org

In 2019, people gathered at Maitighar Mandala (Fibwa Khya) in the morning and marched towards New Baneshwar (Khunthoo). Around 400 people showed up. People held Rainbow Pride Flag, Bisexual Pride Flag, Transgender Pride Flag, Genderqueer Pride Flag, Genderfluid Pride Flag, Intersex Pride Flag along with slogans in four different languages. The theme of the pride march was 'Inclusion of queer (gender and sexual minorities) at all levels of state and decision-making process. Due to the COVID-19 pandemic the second annual Nepal Pride Parade was conducted online. The day started with Tweetathon & Instathon that led to virtual sessions being conducted. The third annual Nepal Pride Parade was also conducted virtually.

== Queer Womxn Pride ==
Queer Womxn Pride is organized every year on International Women's Day. It was organized since 2019 by Queer Youth Group to voice women from diverse sexual orientations and inclusion of women who were assigned intersex at birth as well as transgender women. The term 'womxn' was used instead of 'woman' the rally to claim a language where 'man' does not become the central or by default gender. A queer tree was also marked on the event. Second annual Queer Womxn Pride was cancelled due to the COVID-19 pandemic. The third annual Queer Womxn Pride was gathered in Bwojyaa-khya / Bhrikutimandap, Kathmandu. The theme of the year was All women from now. The rally called for inclusion of intersex women, transgender women and women of diverse sexual orientations beyond heterosexuality and against other gender

== Trans Pride Parade ==
Trans Pride Parade is celebrated the Saturday following December 17. The event is organized by Queer Youth Group and Trans Rights Collective since 2020. The event marks a linguistic landmark on 17 December 2018 when the term transgender was introduced in Nepali language as pāralaingik (Nepali: पारलैङ्गिक), while prior to it trans people were referred with derogatory terminologies in the language. The event was held in Basantapur, Kathmandu. In 2021, around a hundred people marched from Fibwakhya (Maitighar Mandala) to New Baneshwar.

== Blue Diamond Society ==
Blue Diamond Society organizes an LGBT March on a Newar festival Gai Jatra(Saa Paaru). However, the event isn't seen as a Pride Parade, and rather a celebration of its own, different from 'Western concept' of Pride Parade.

== Gallery ==
=== Nepal Pride Parade, 2019 ===
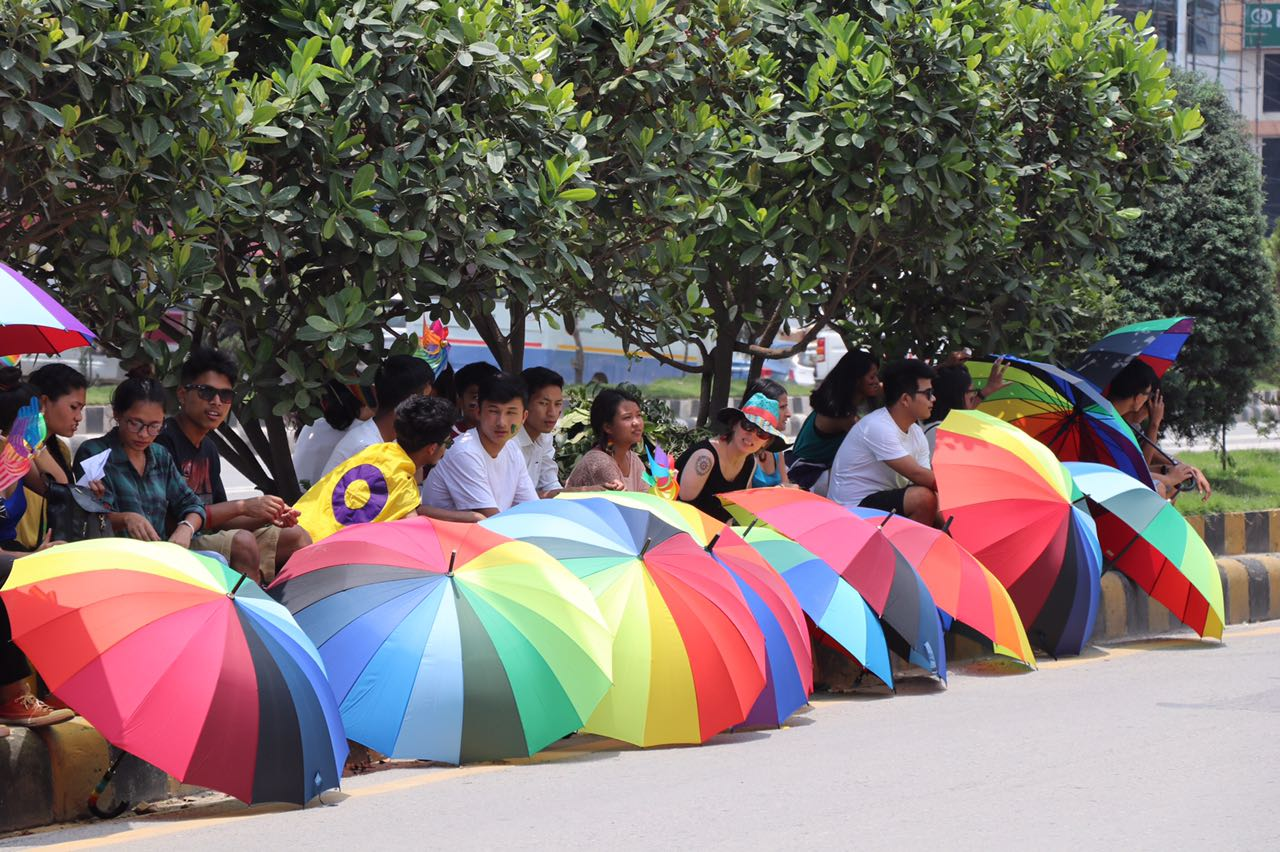

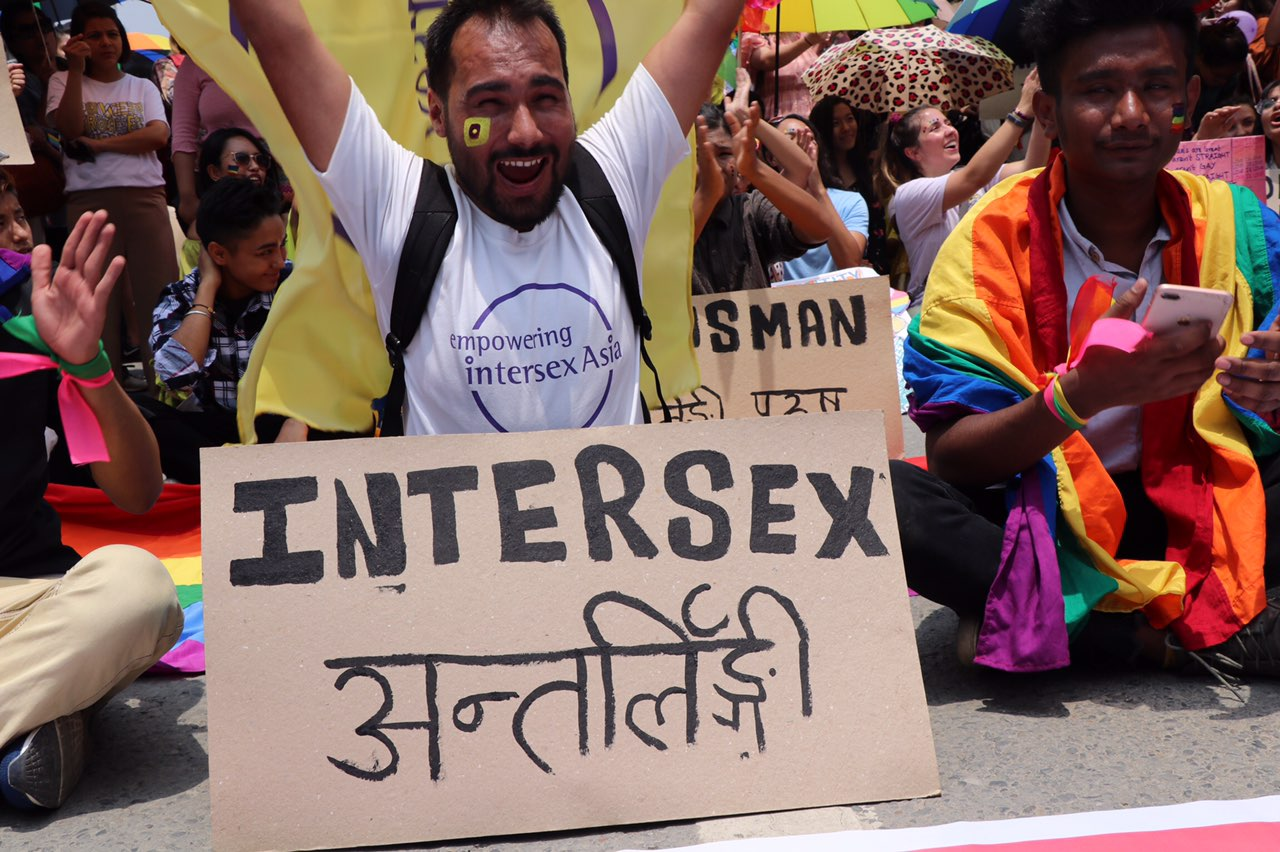

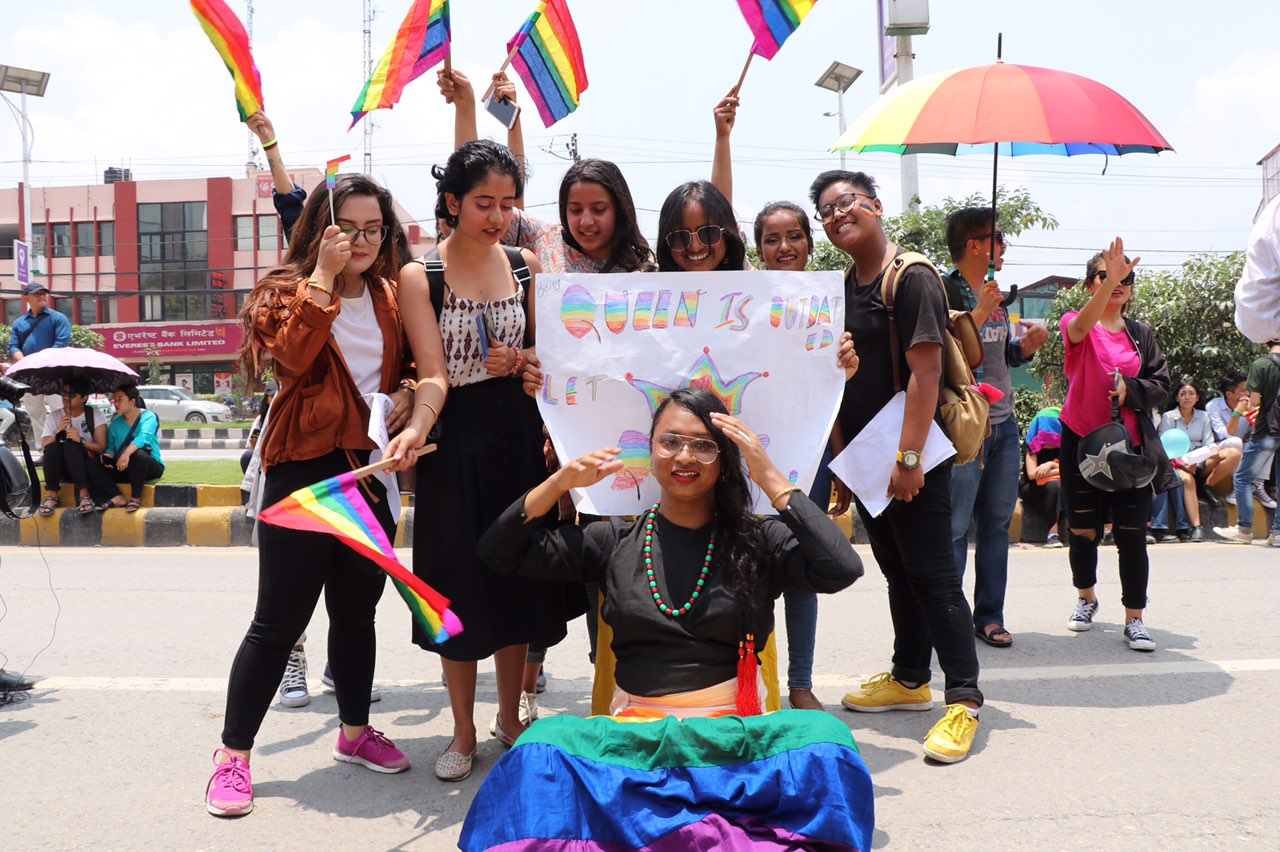

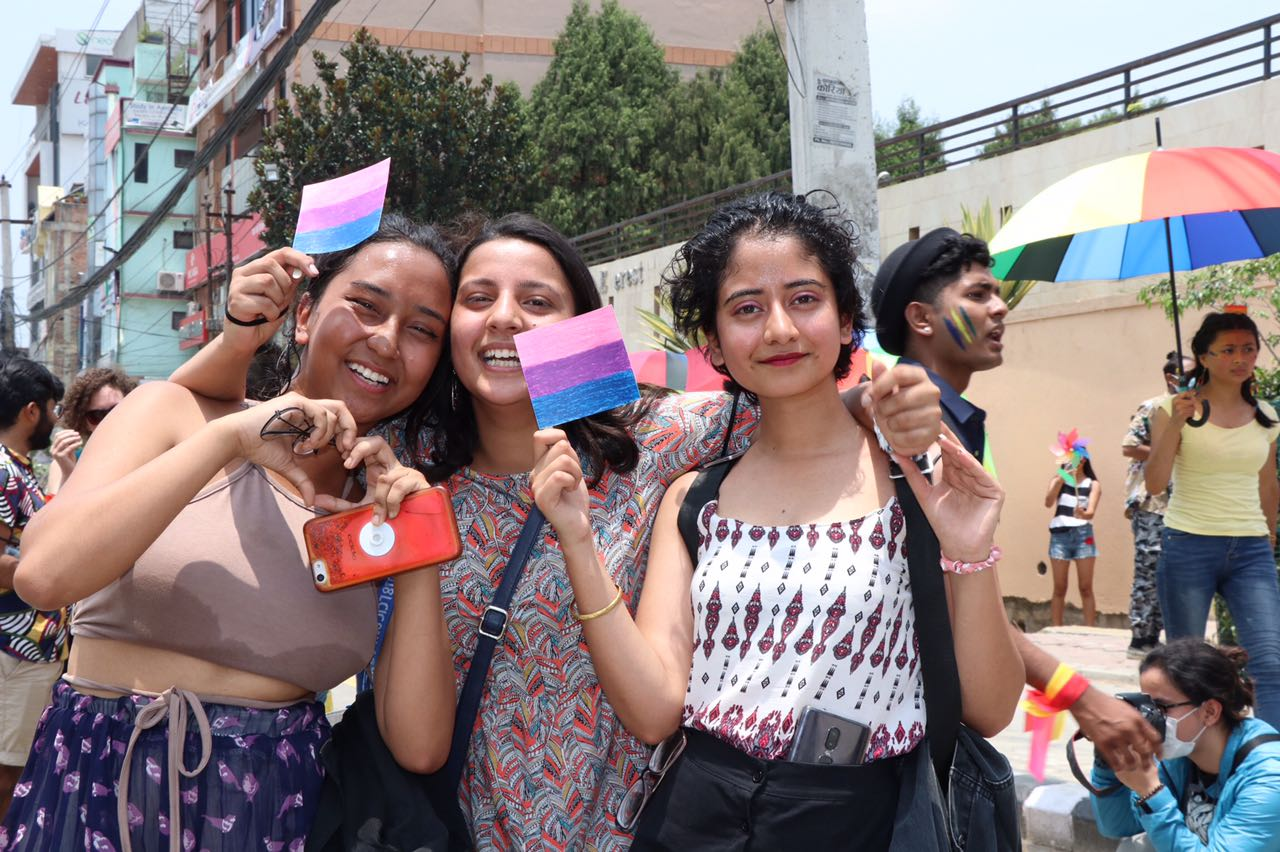

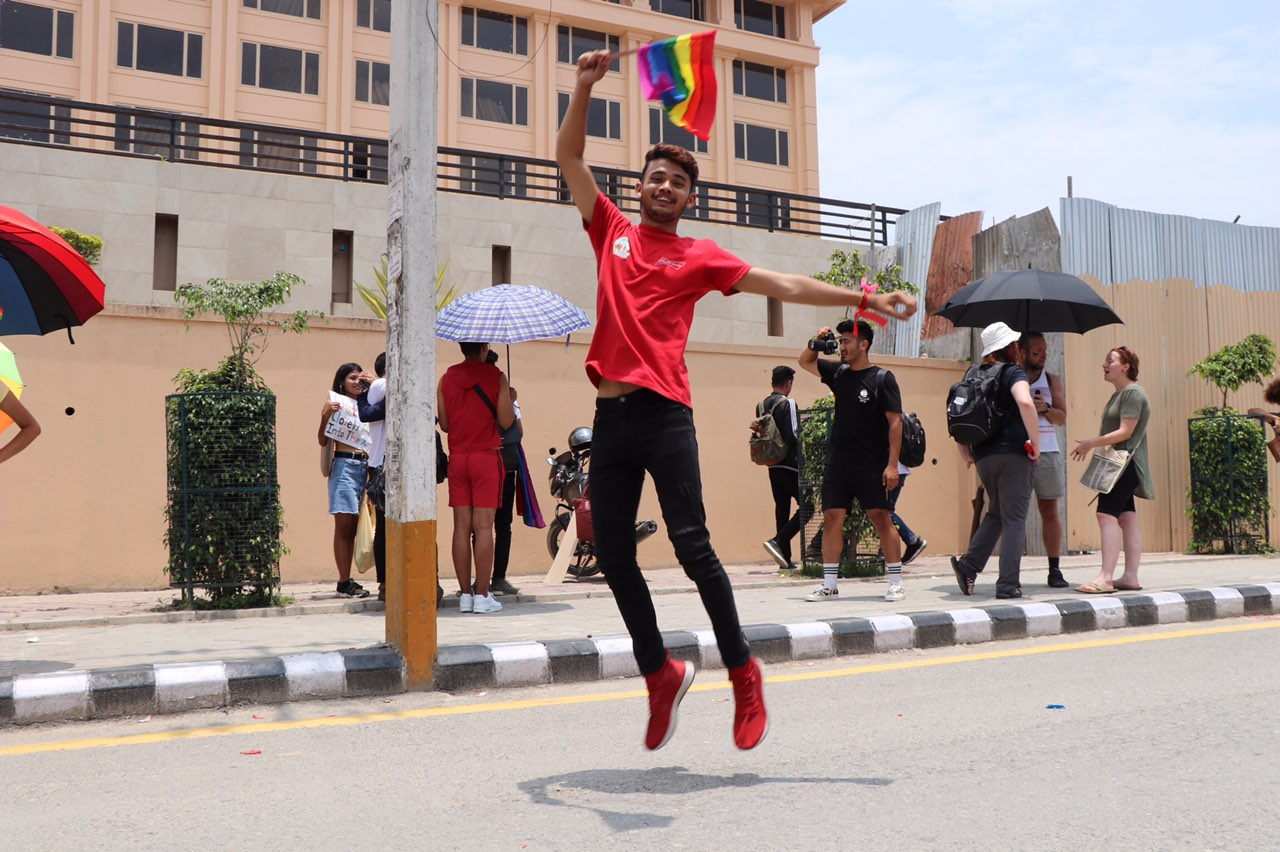

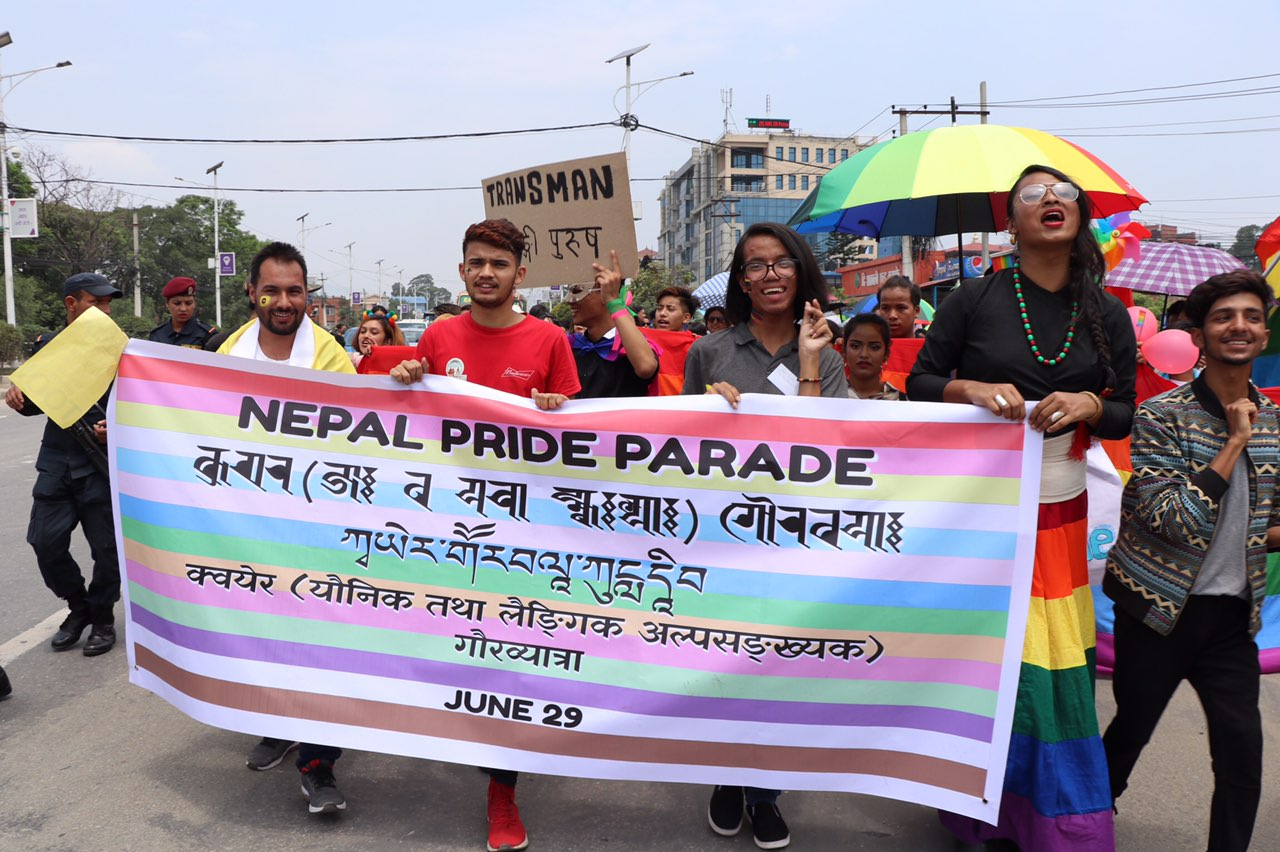

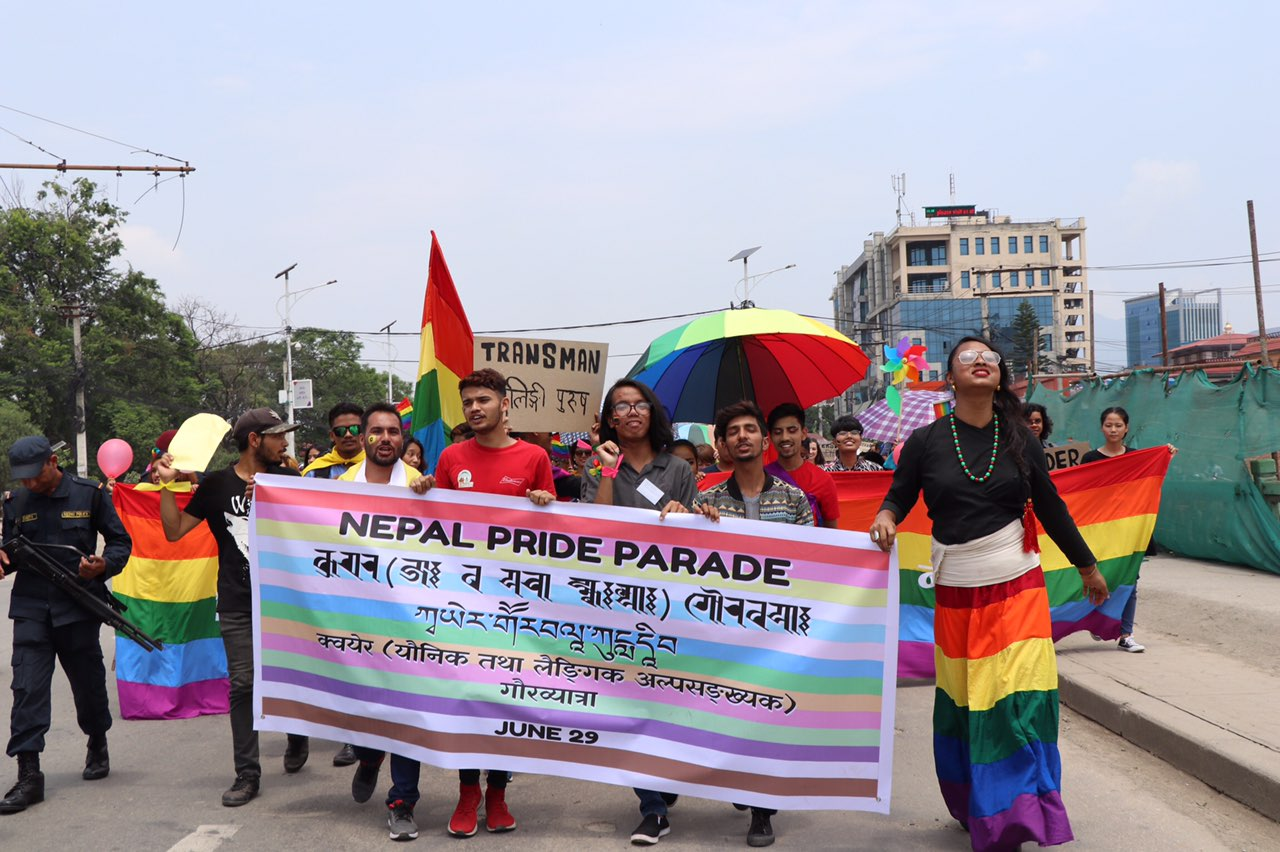

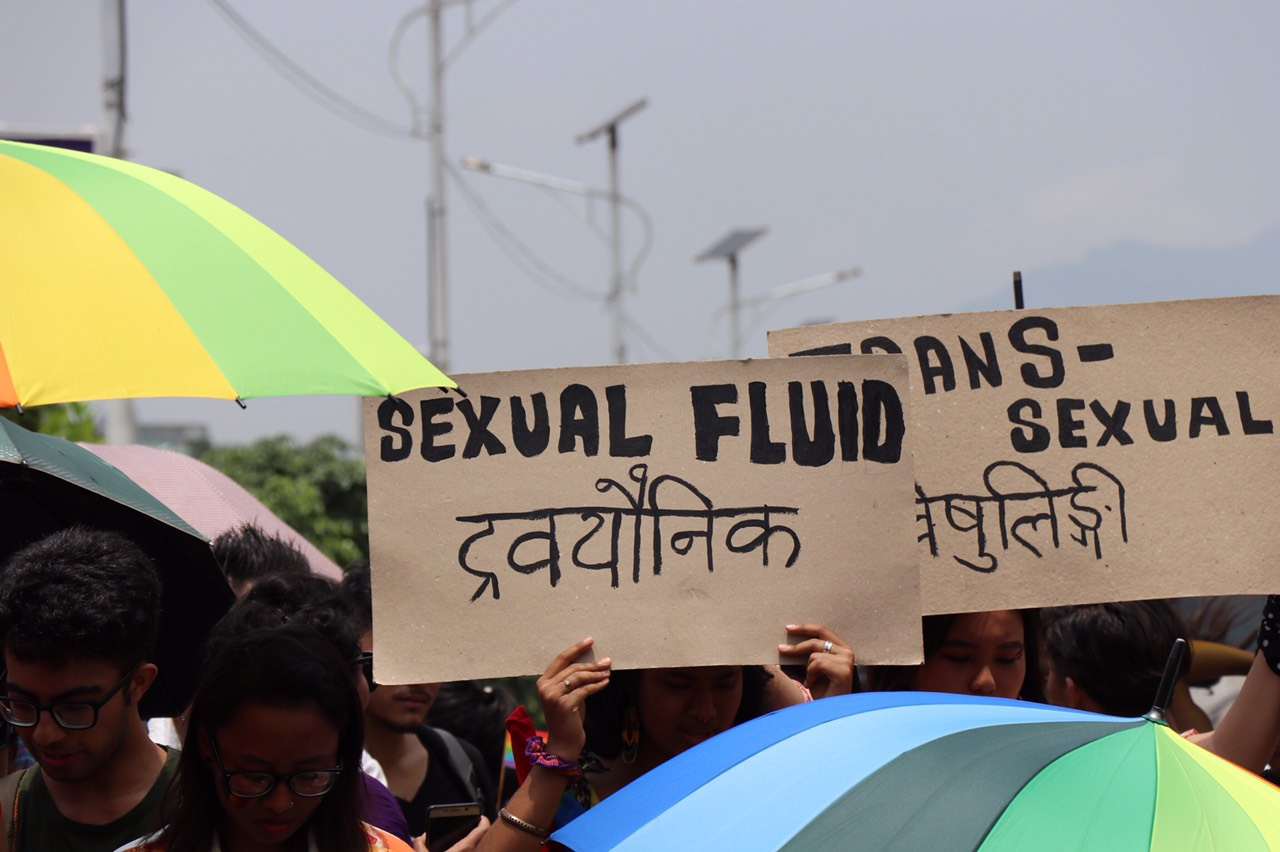

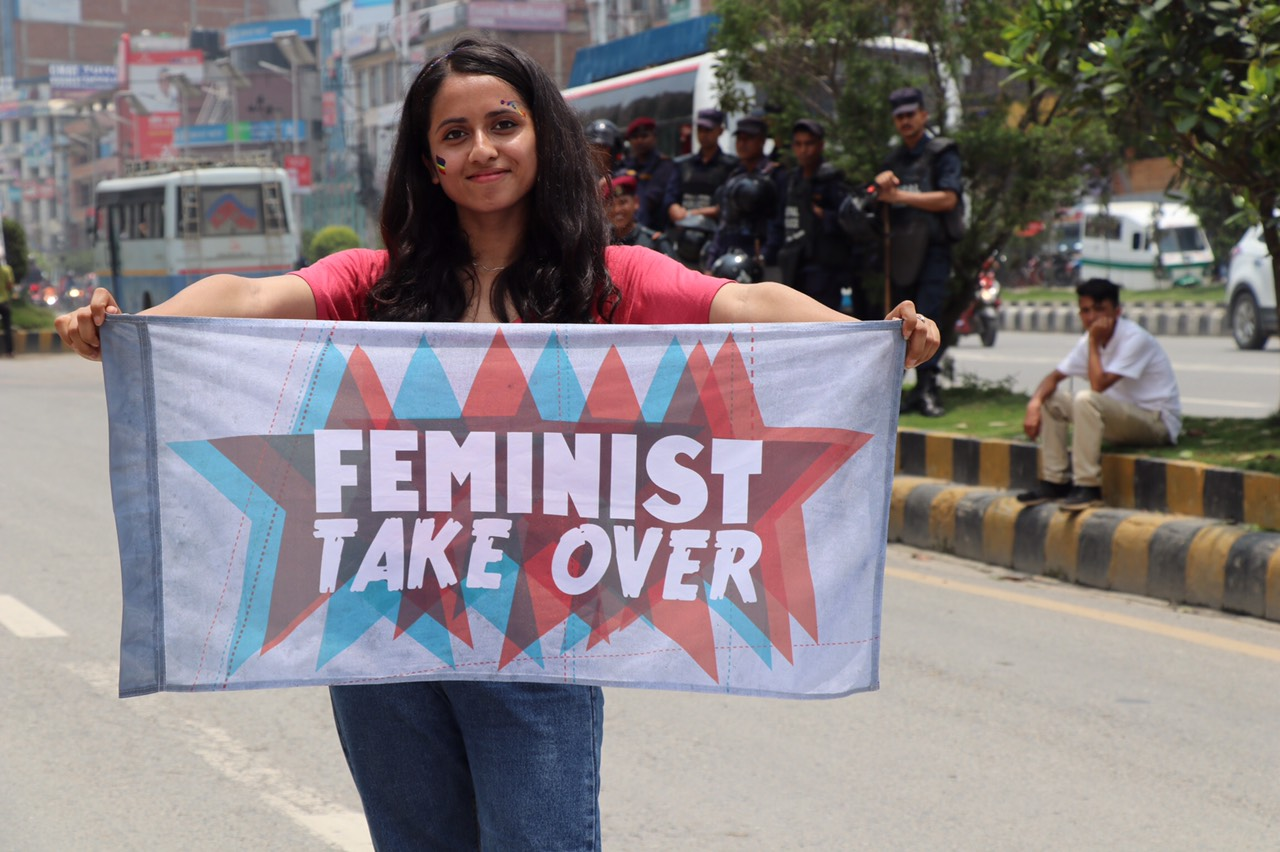

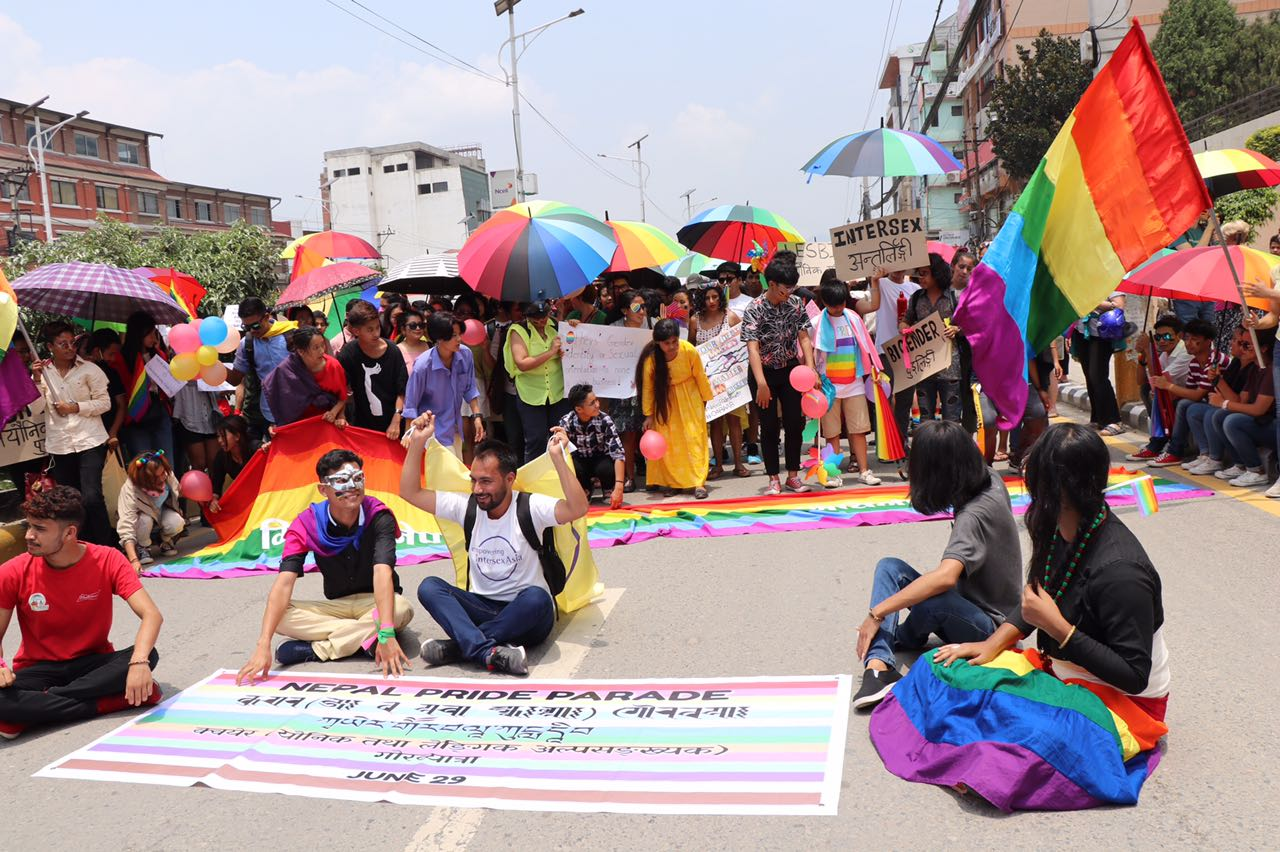

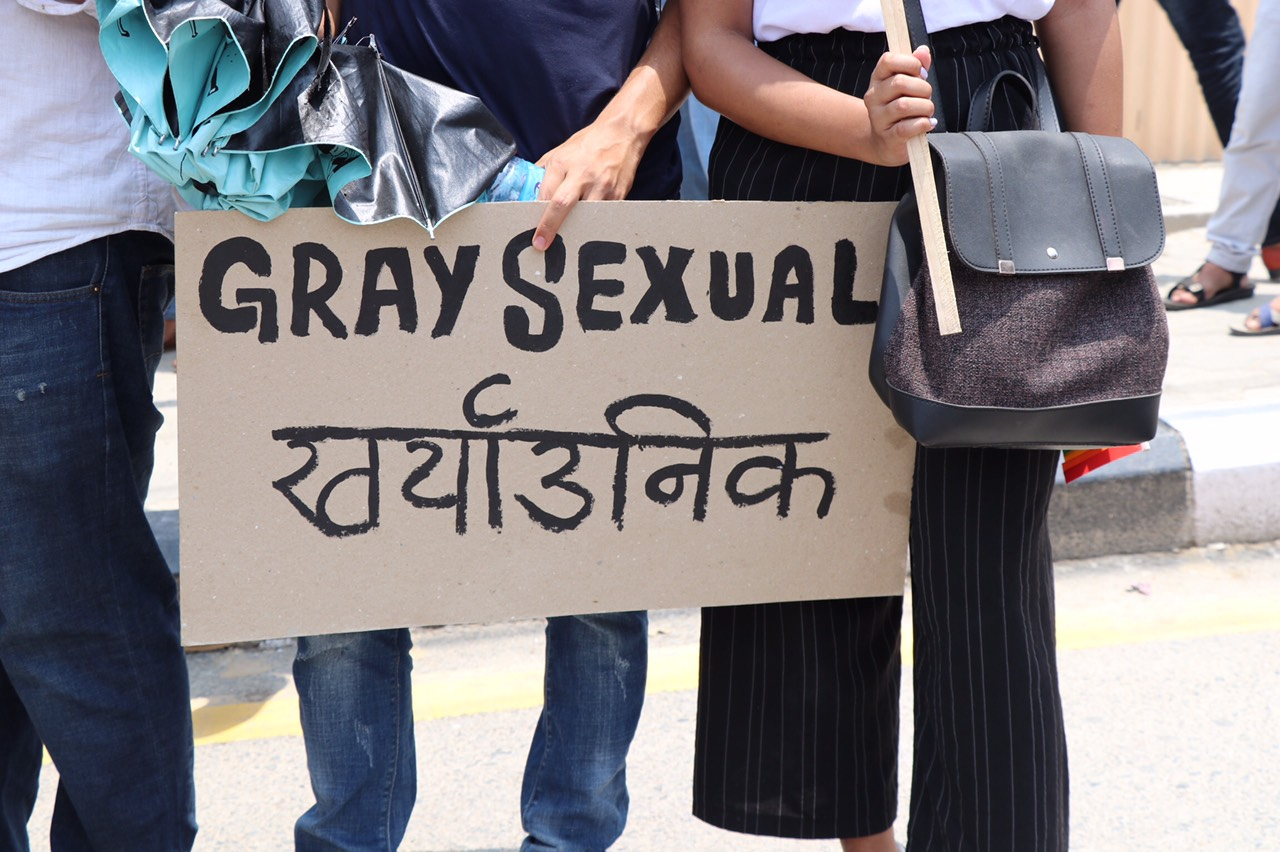

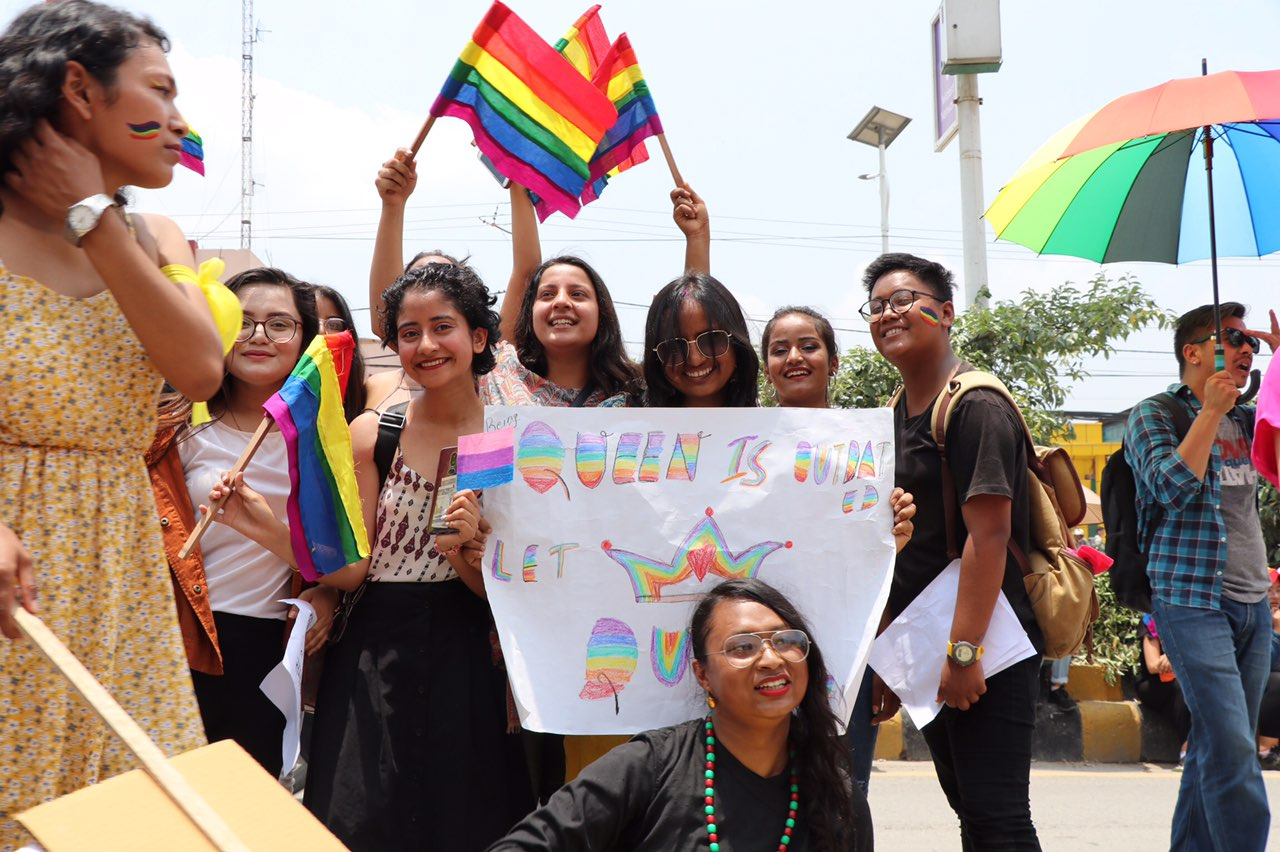

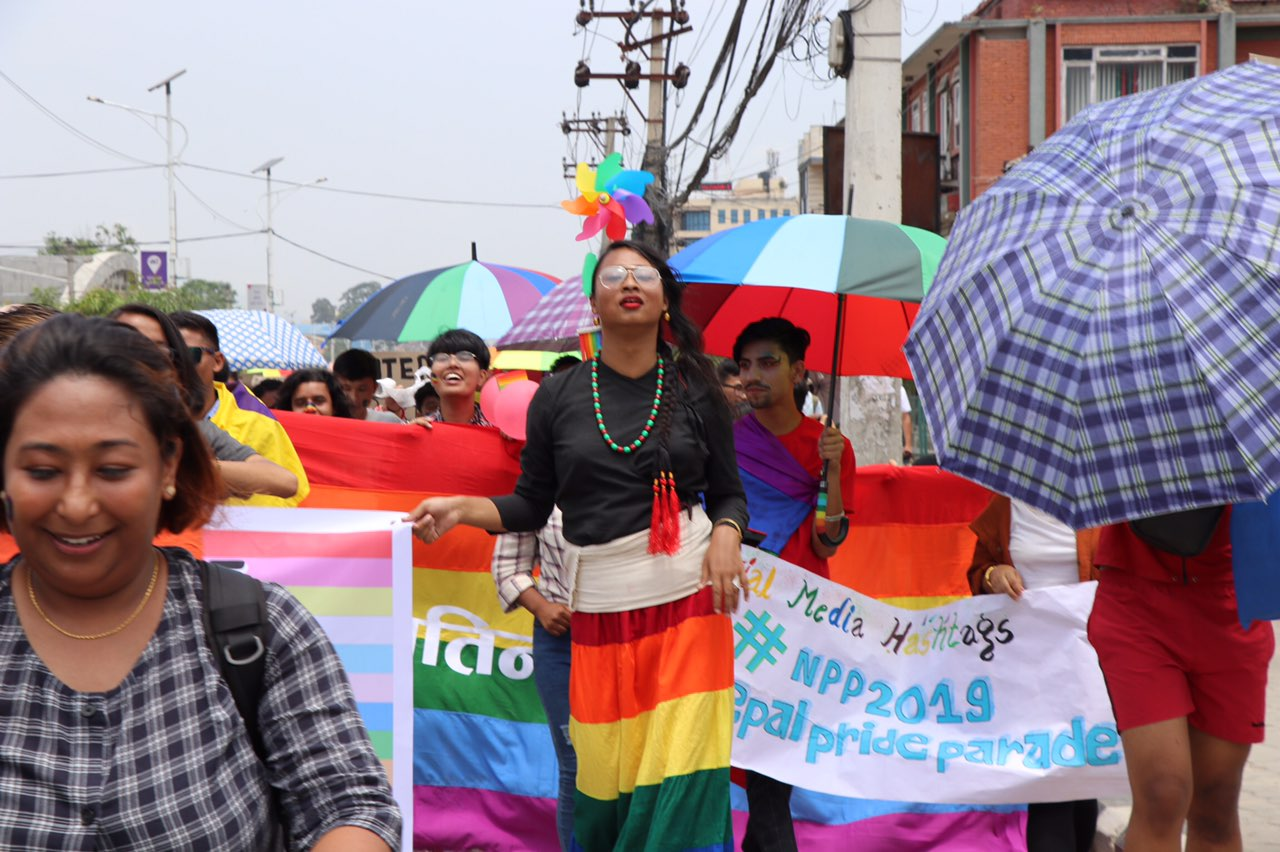

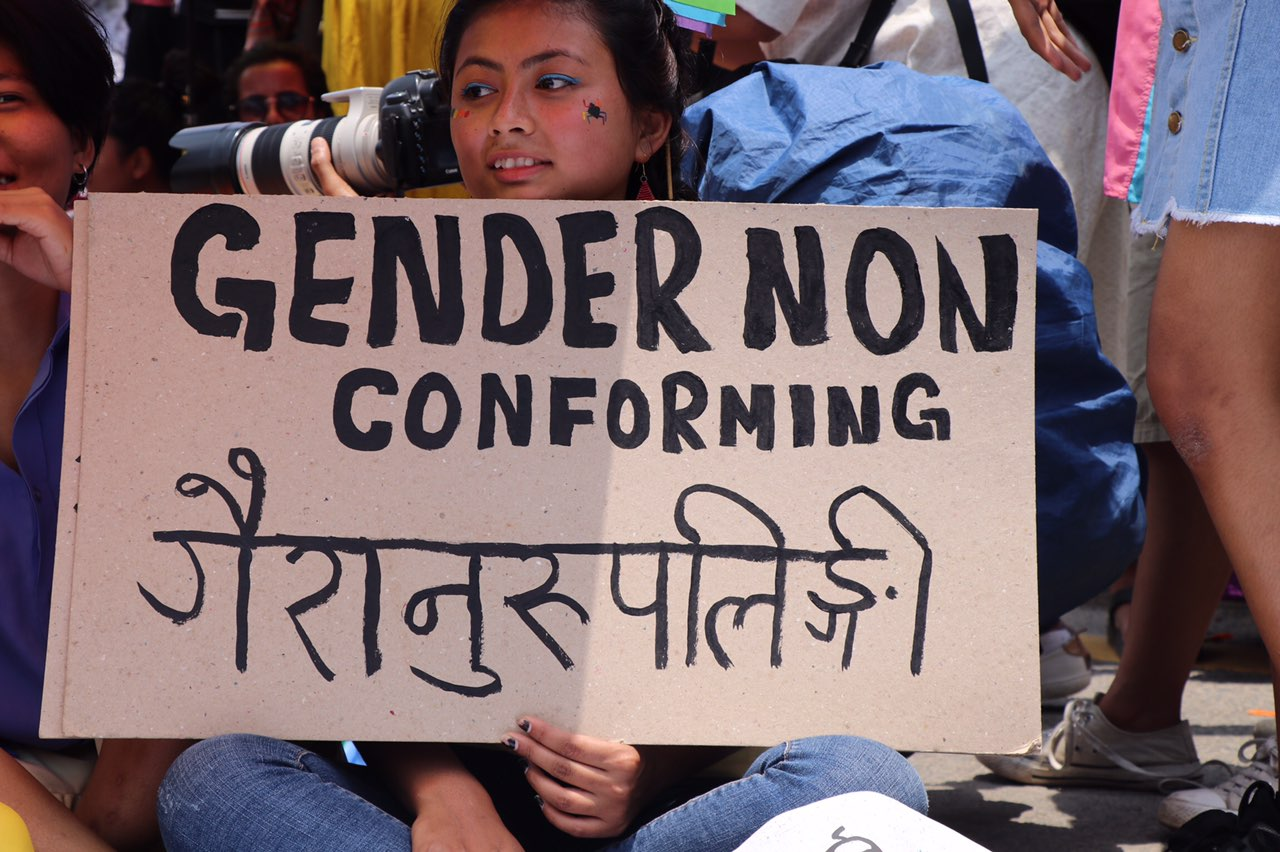

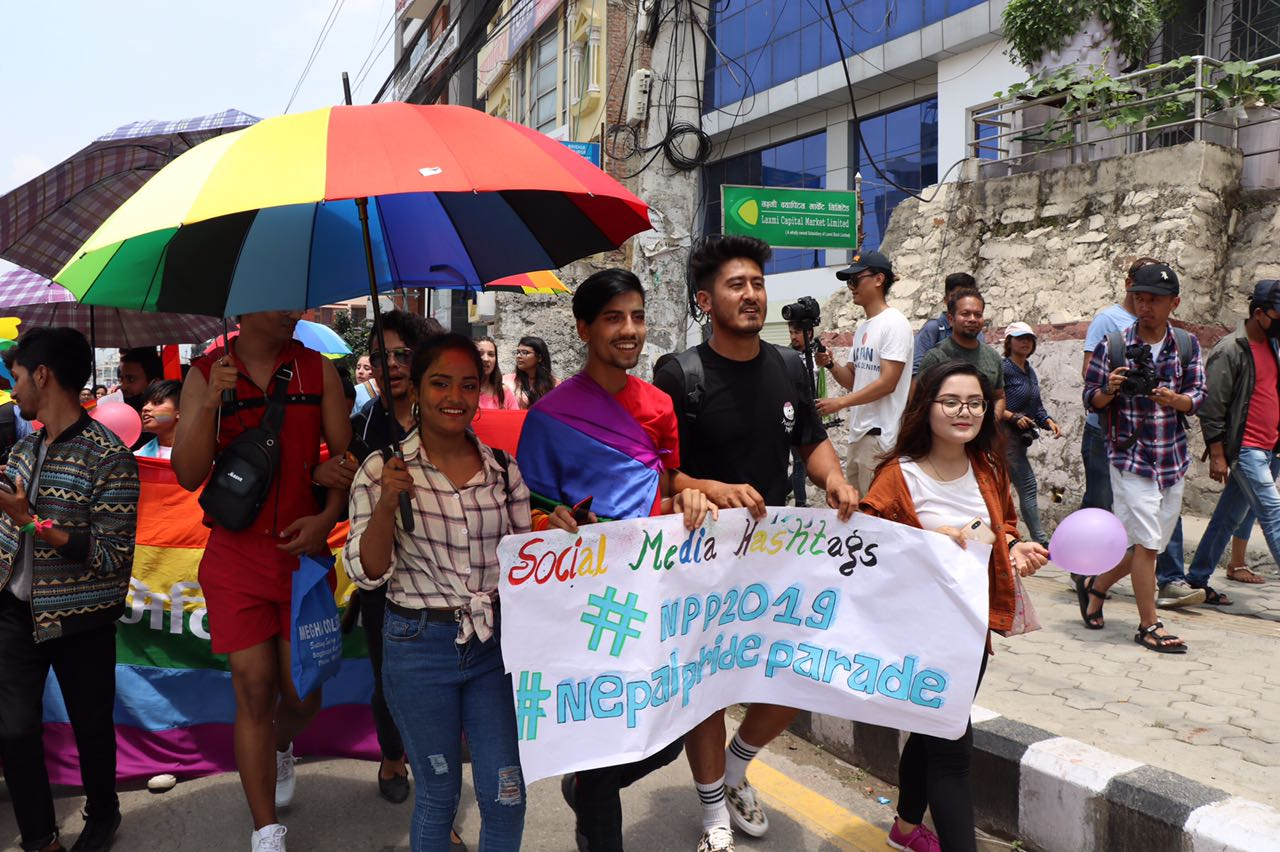

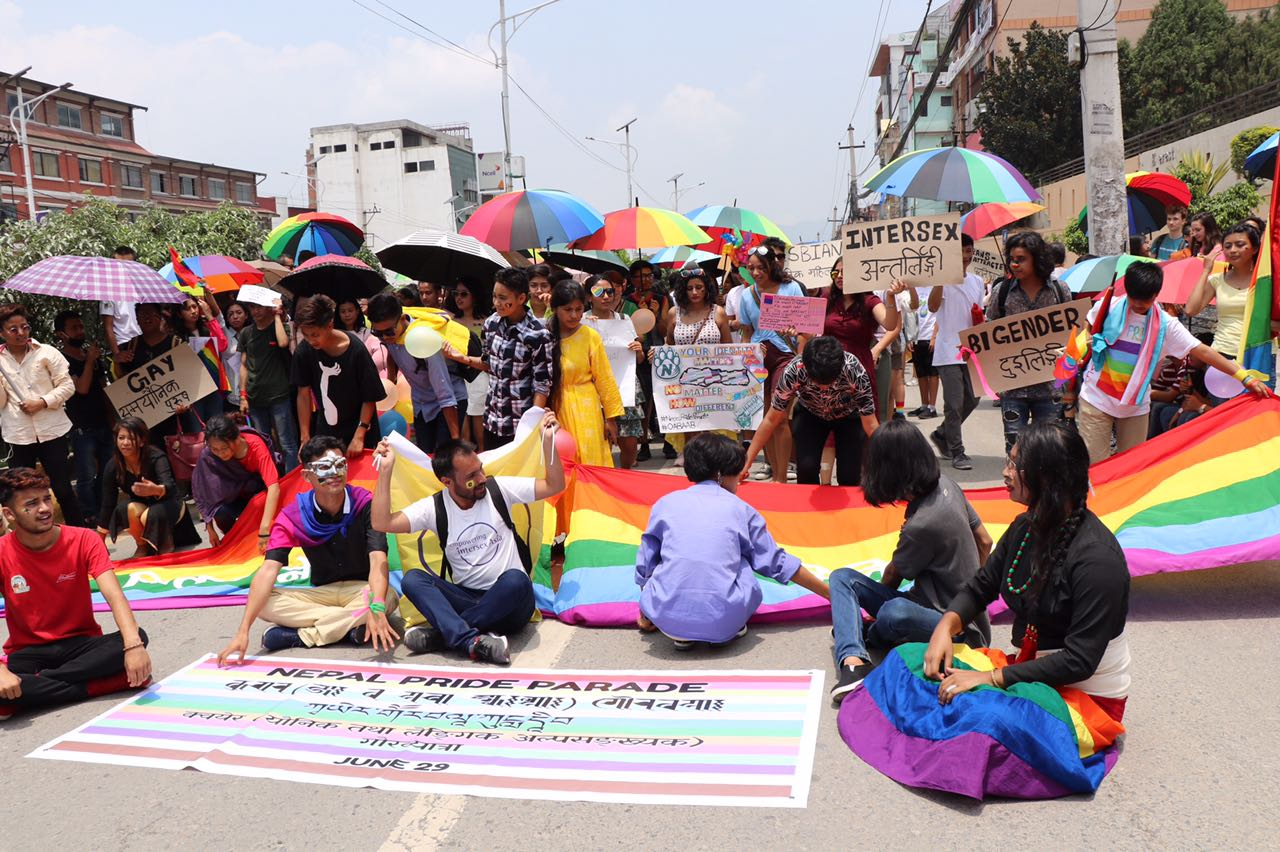

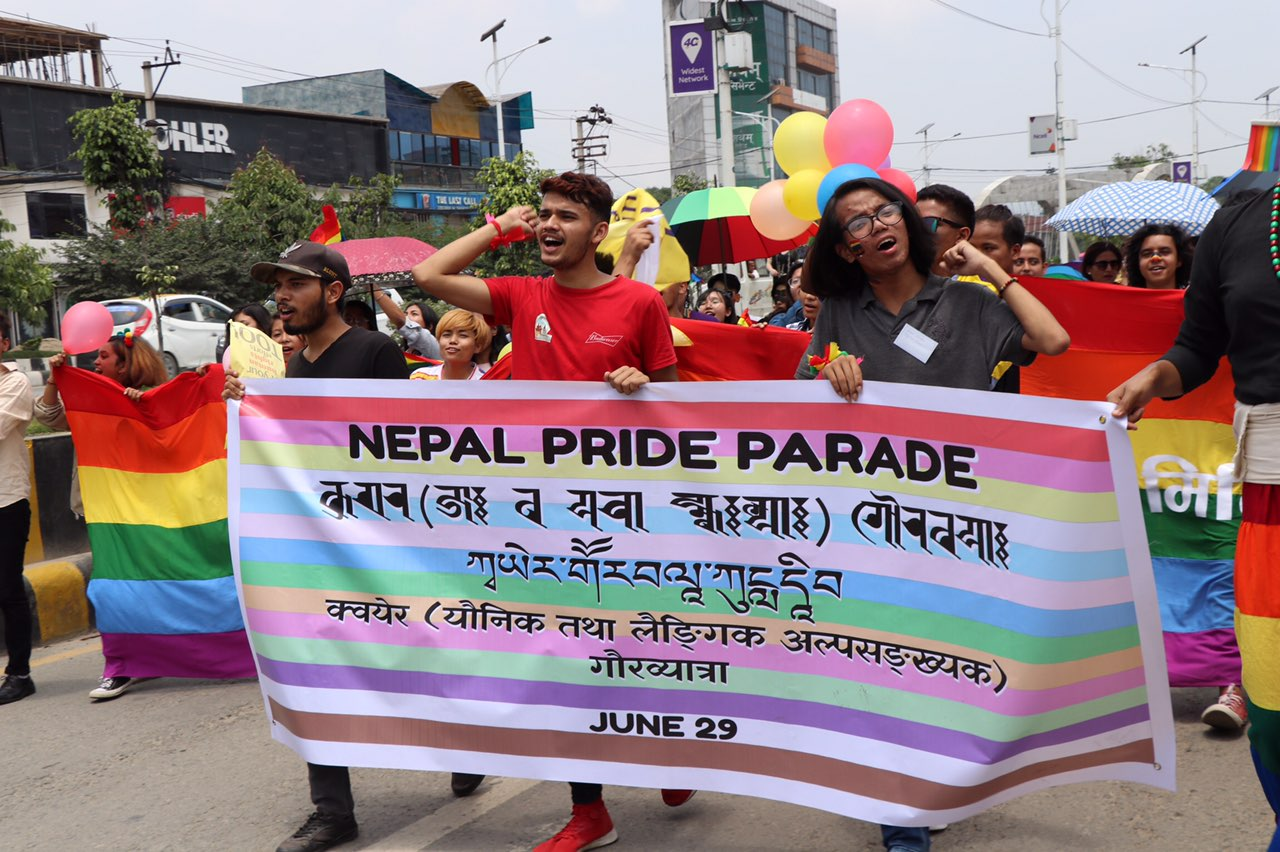

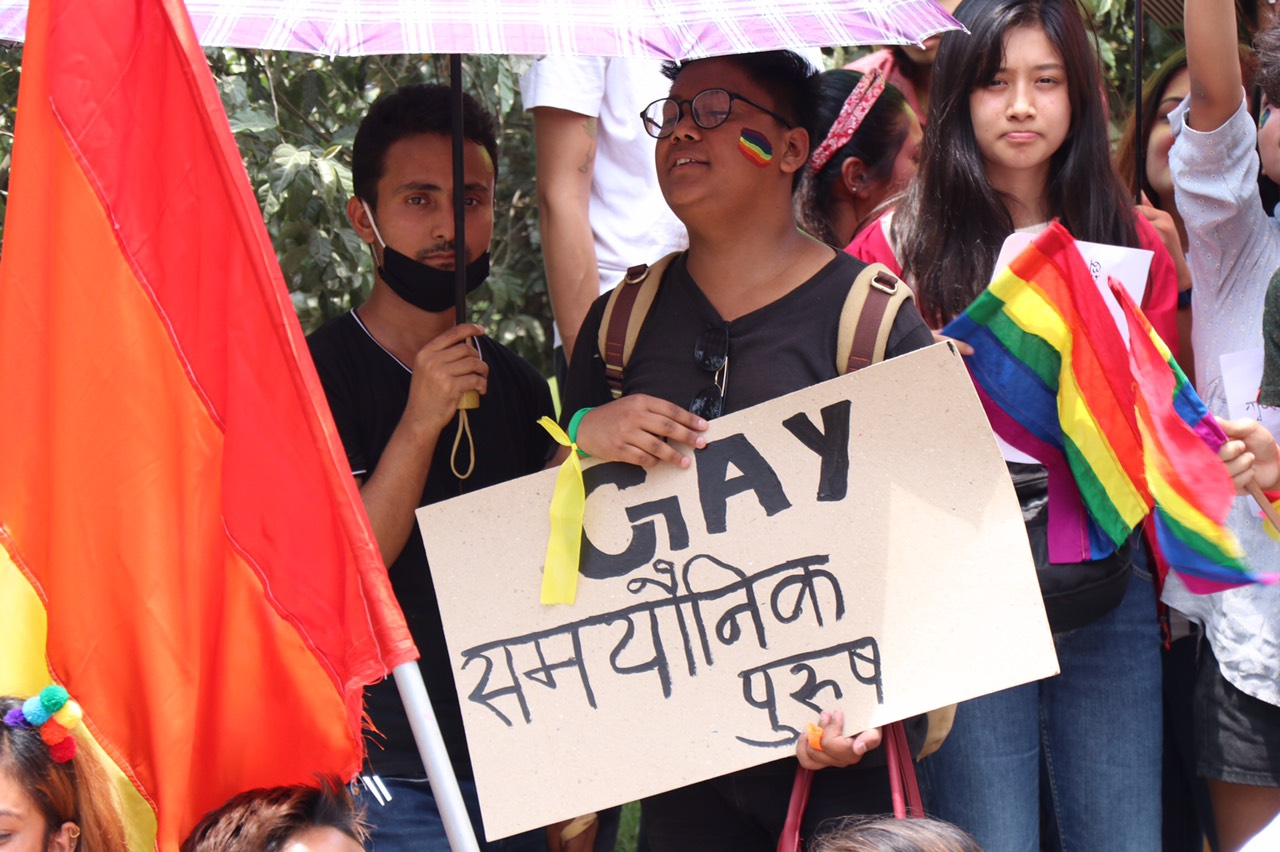

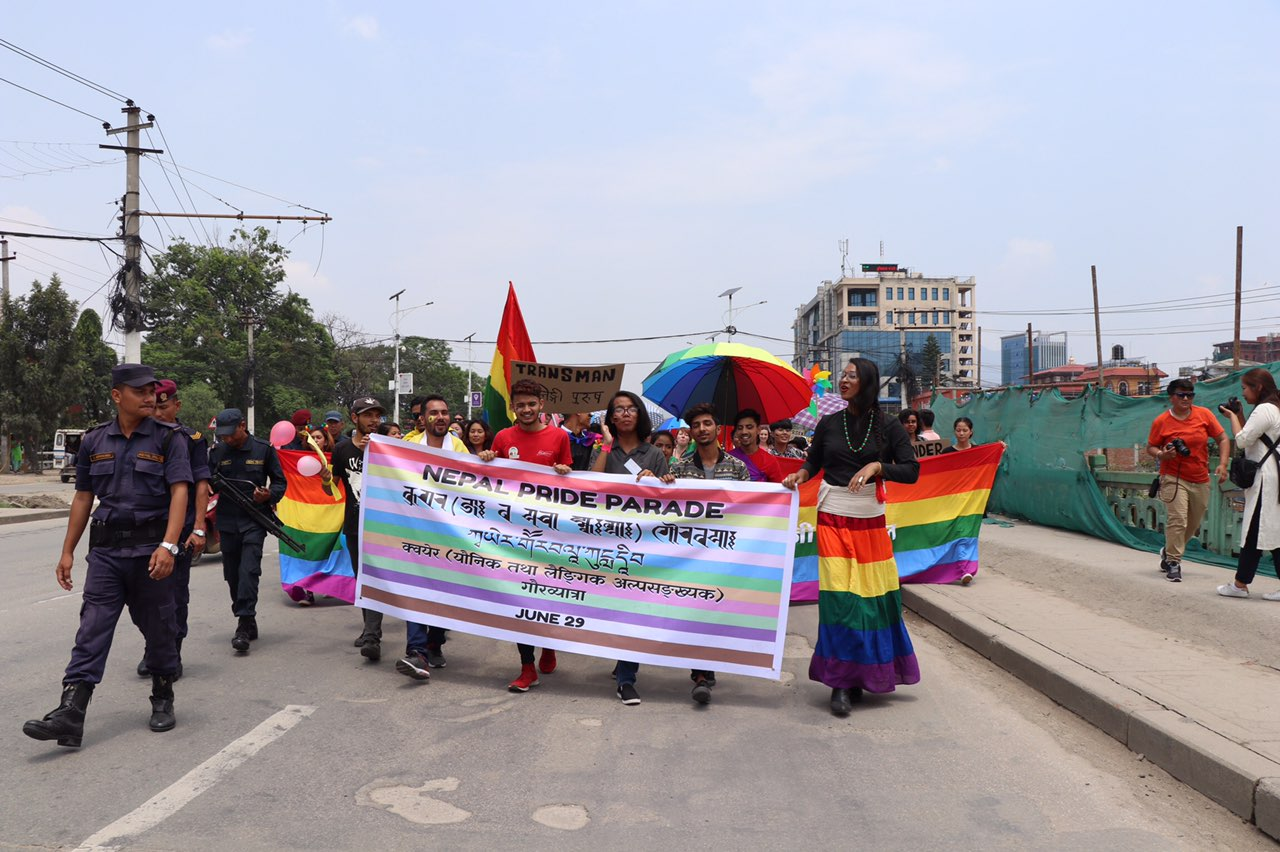

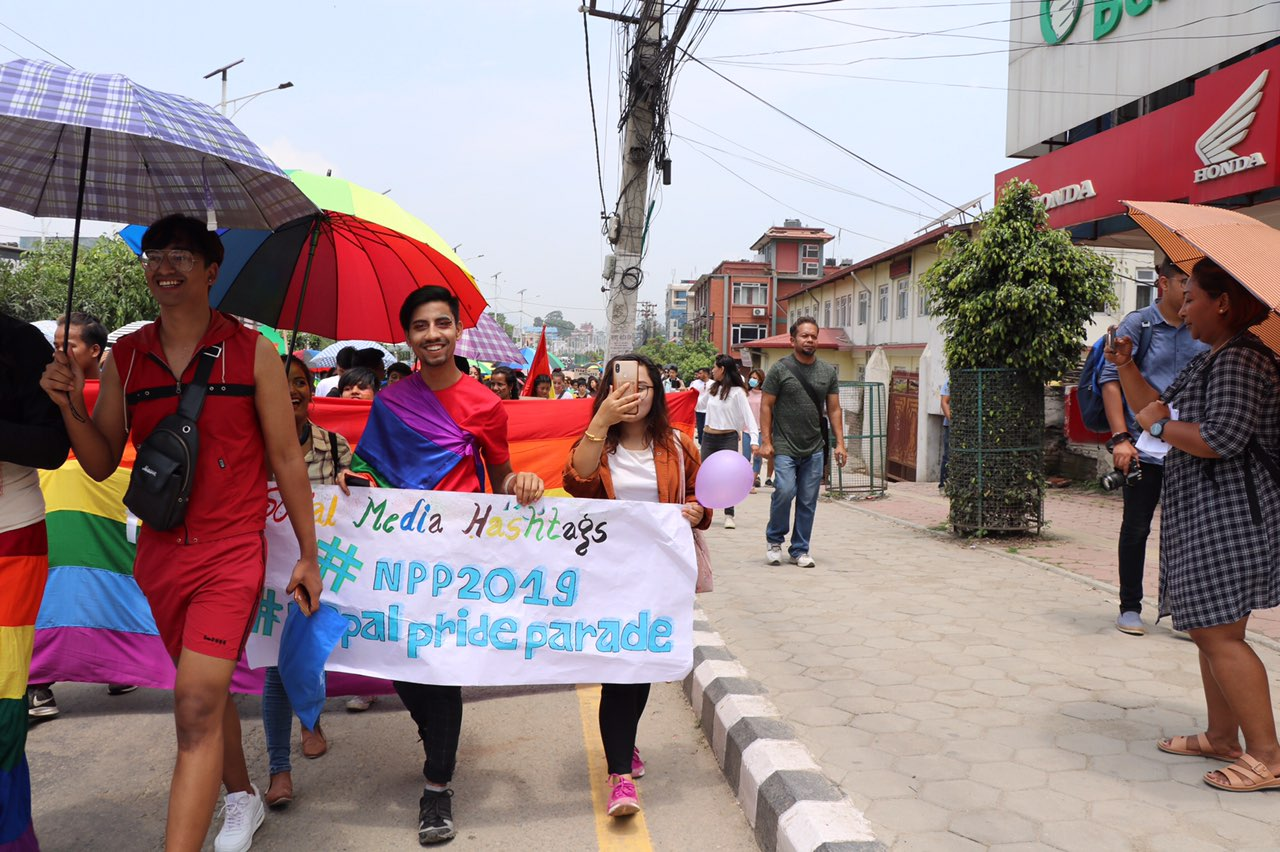

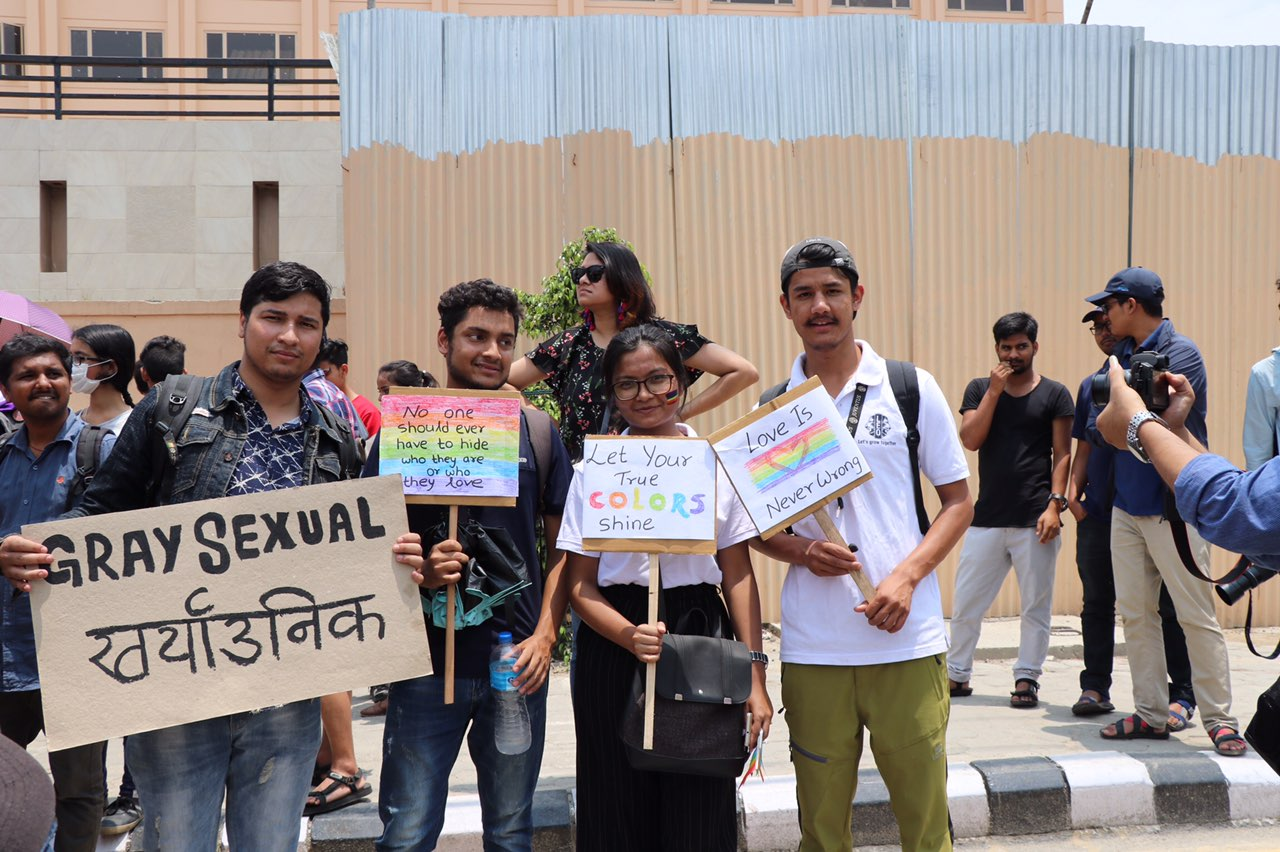

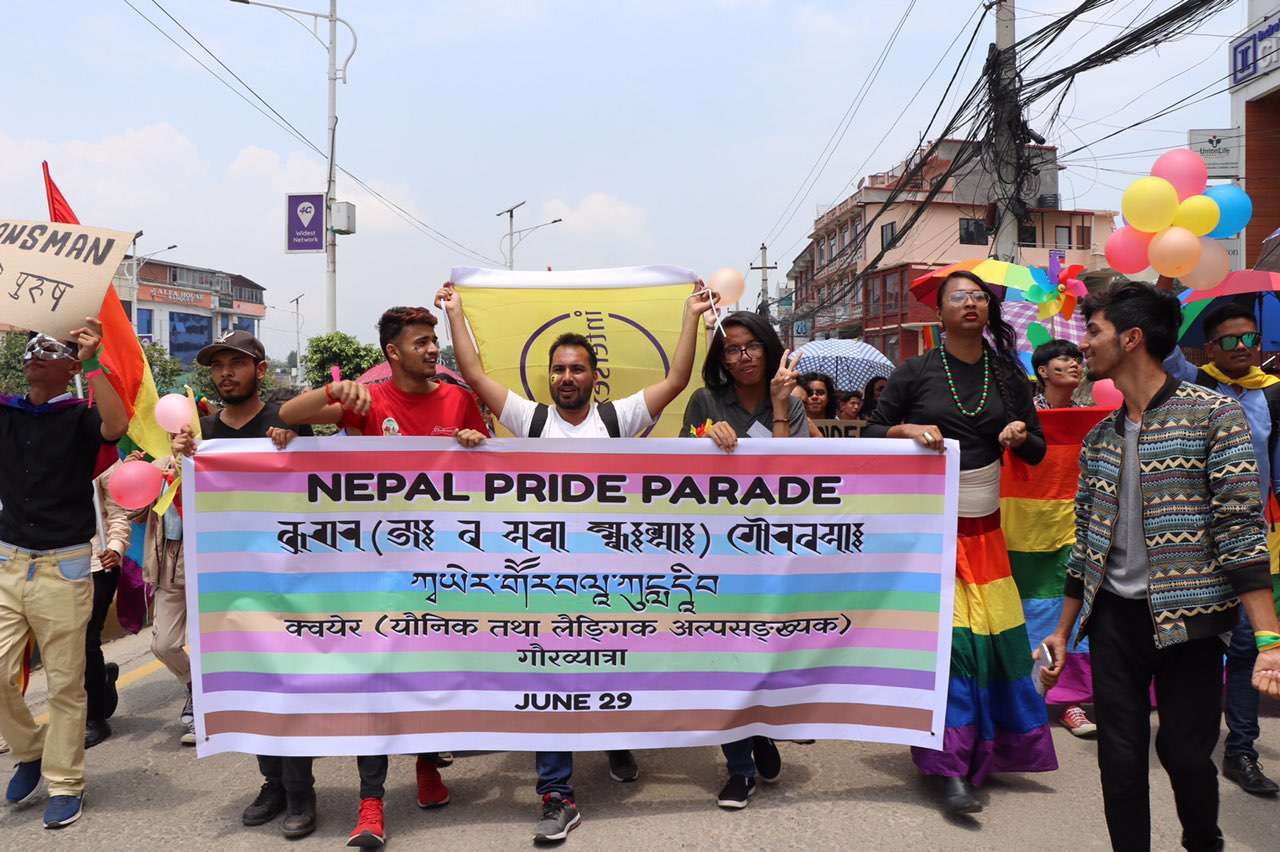

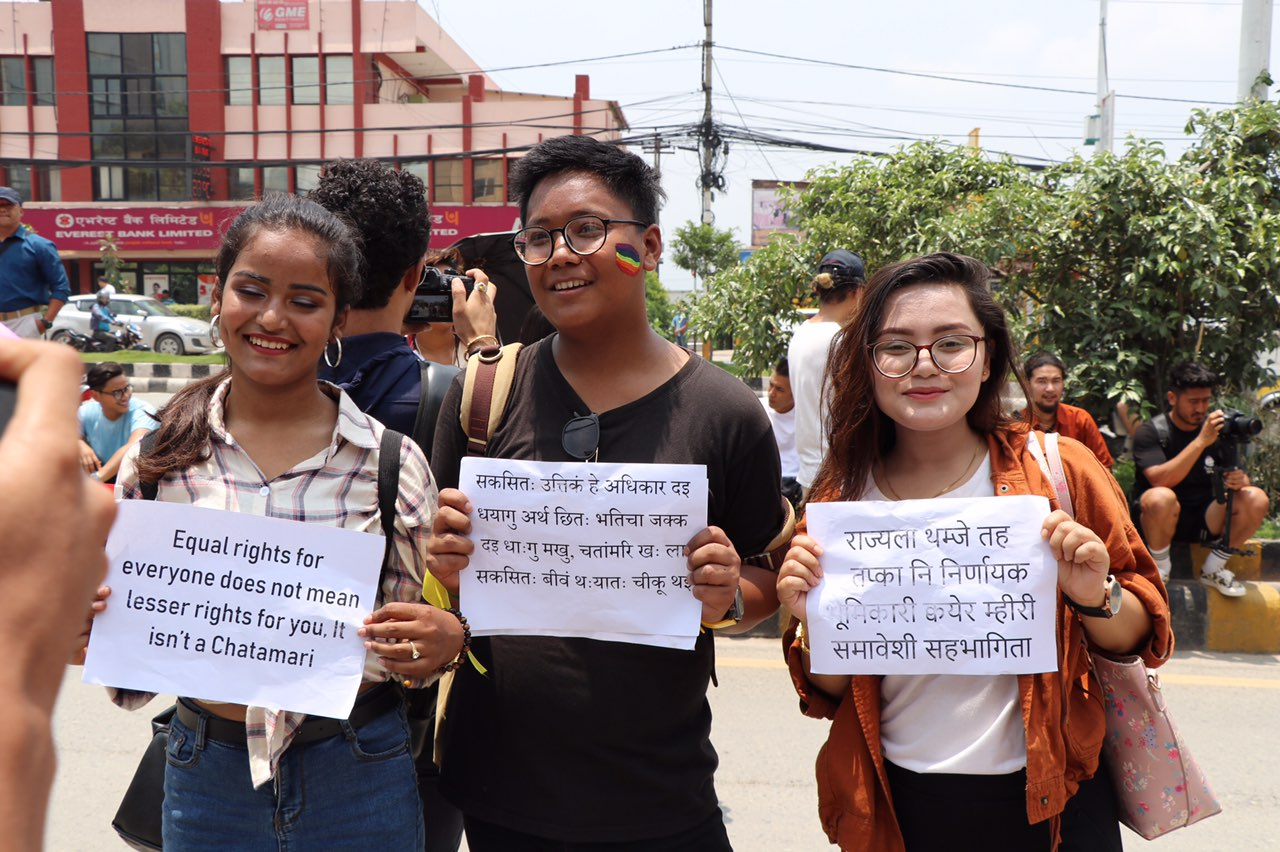

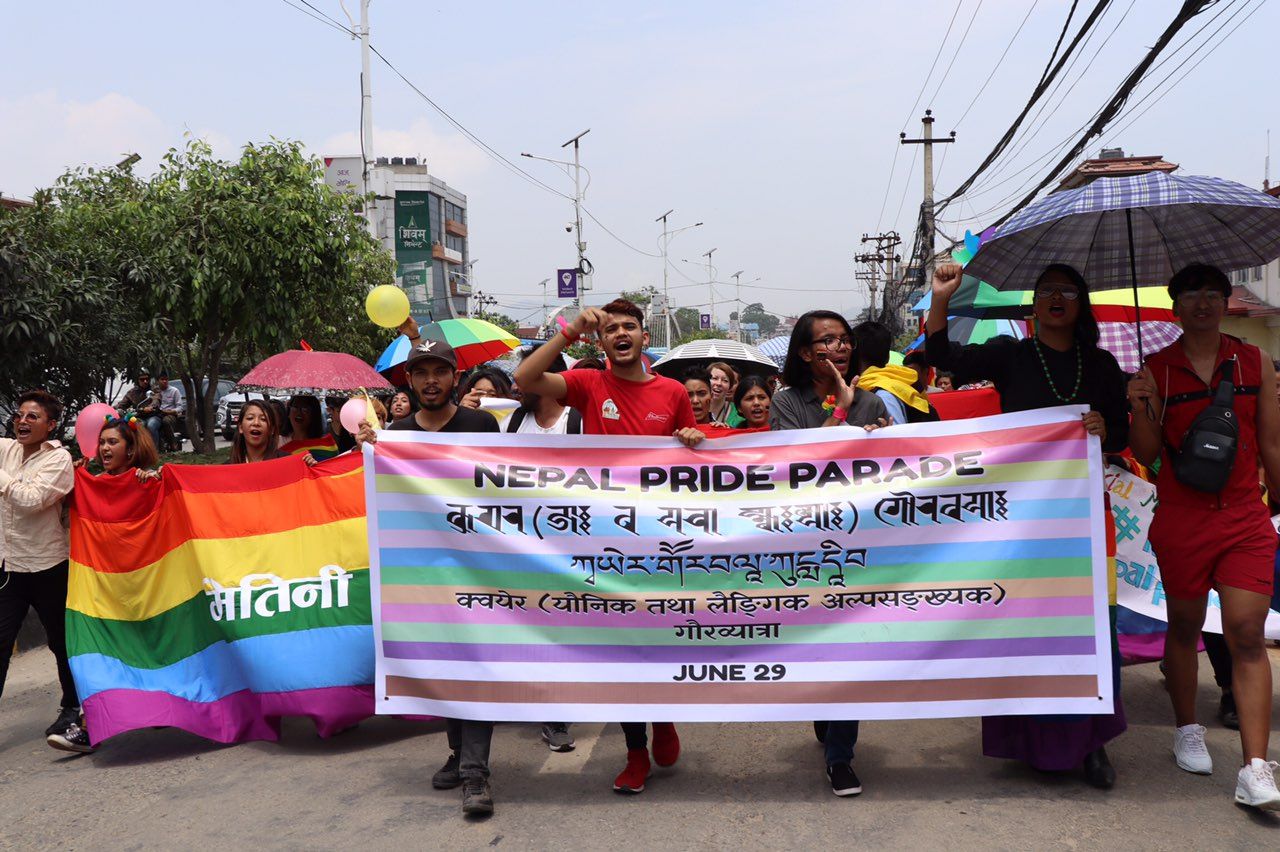

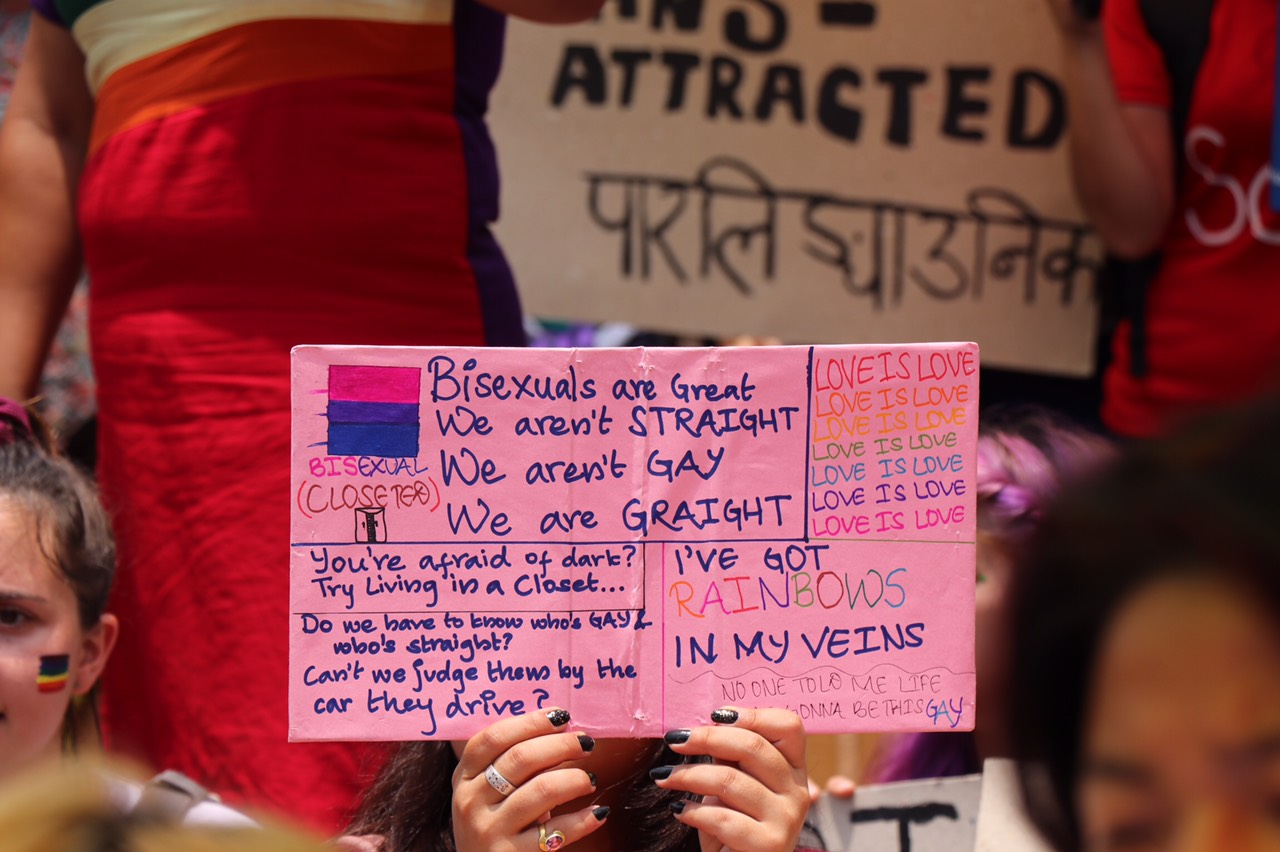

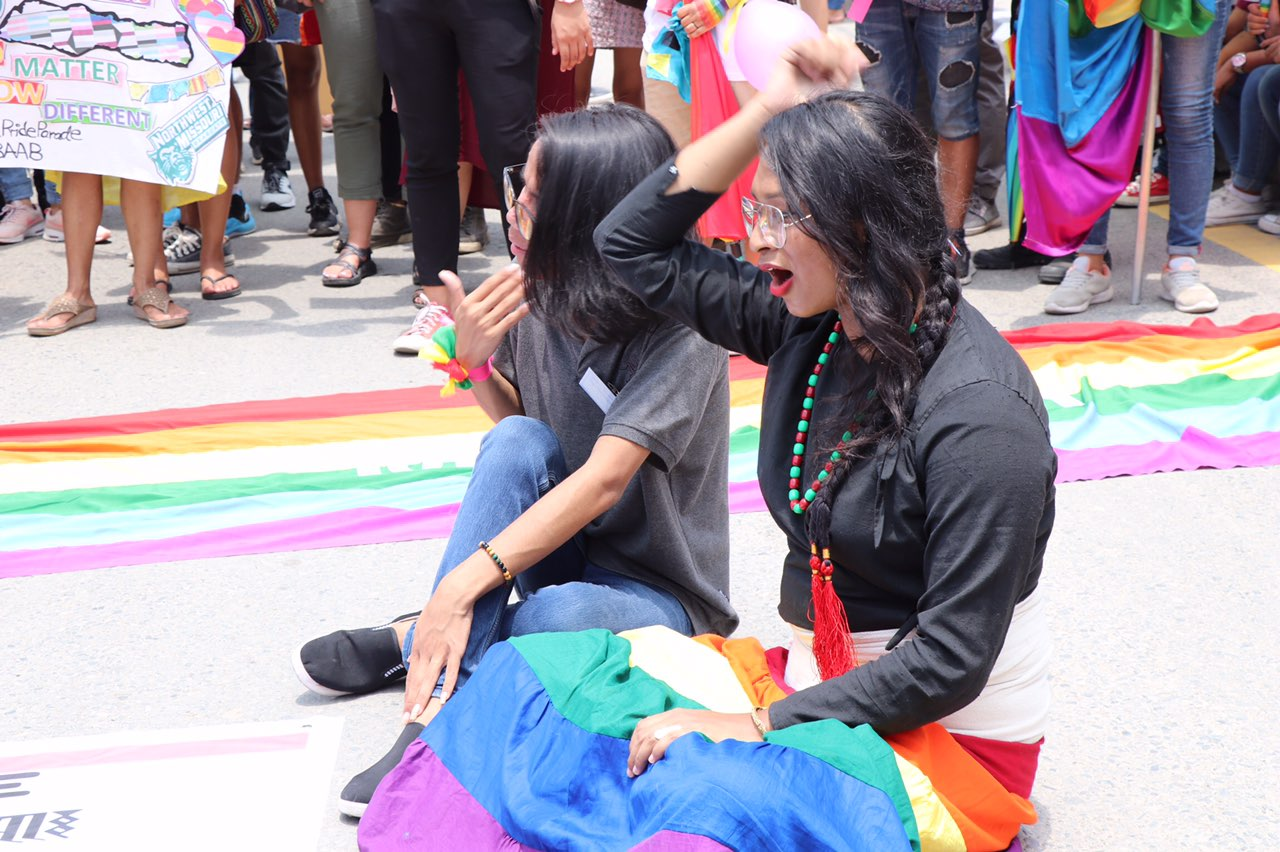

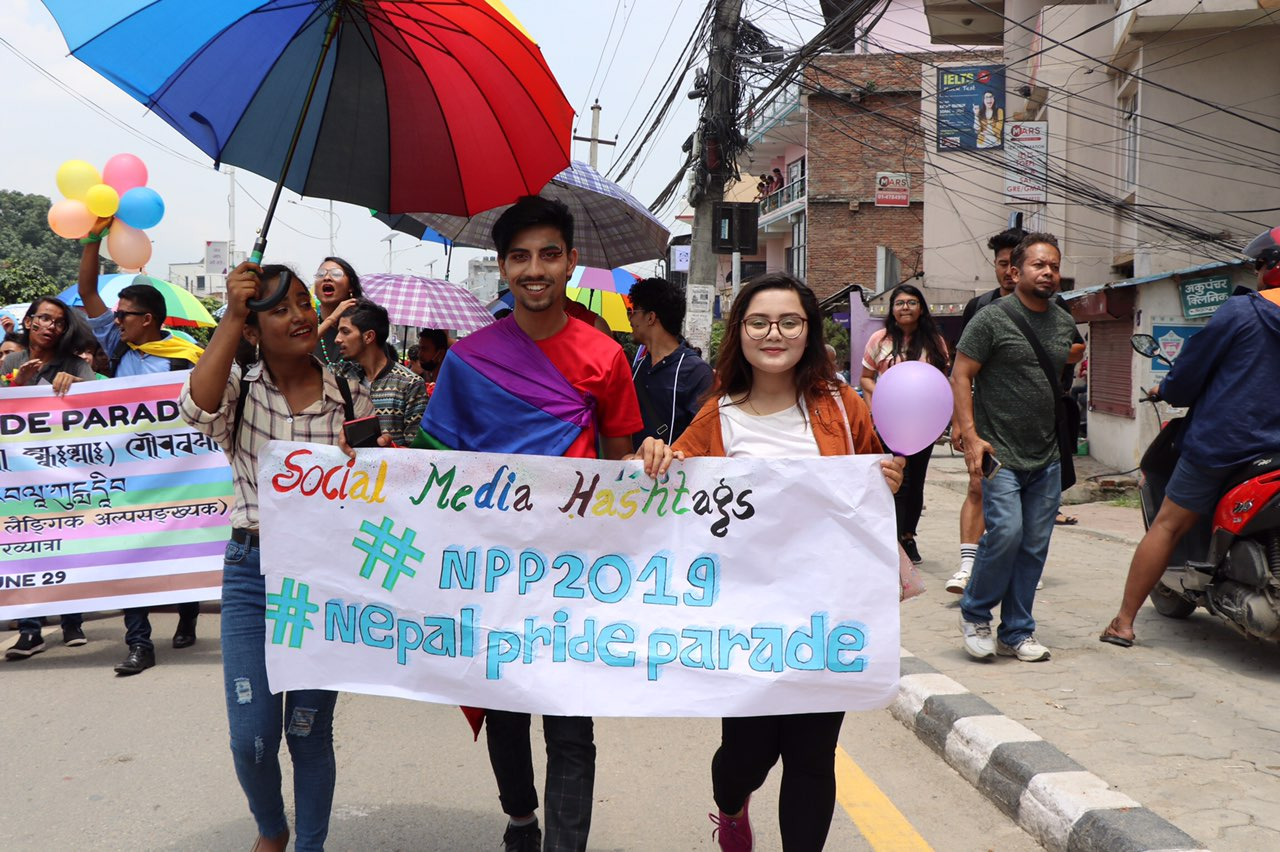

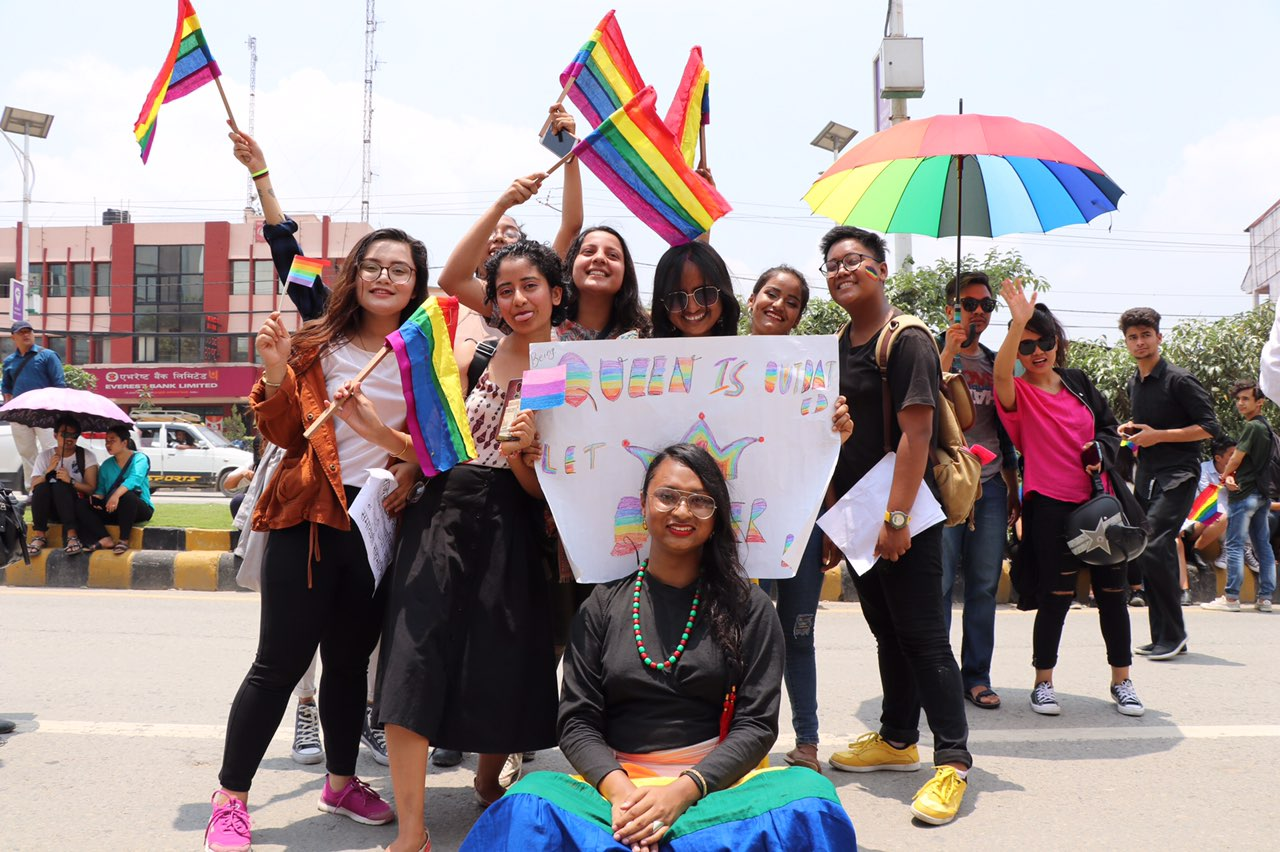

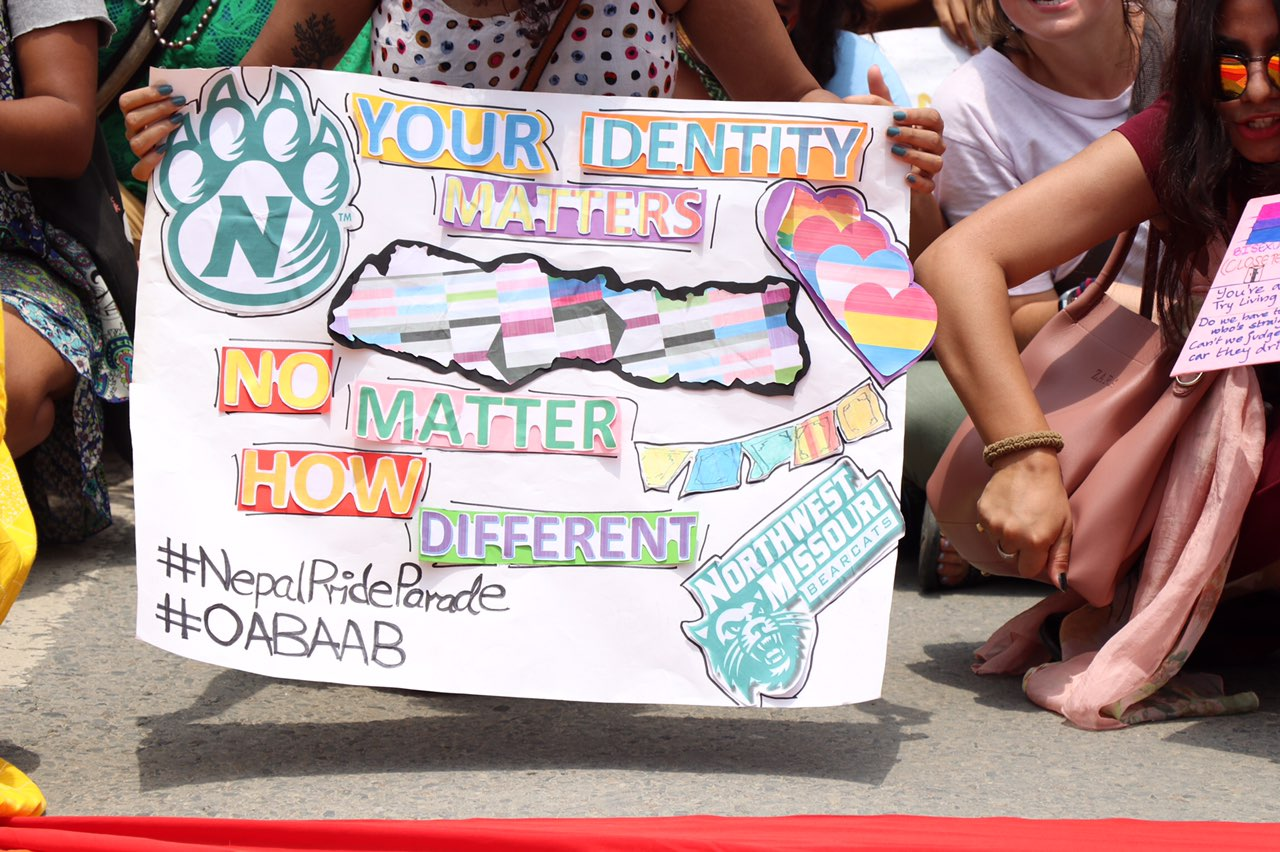

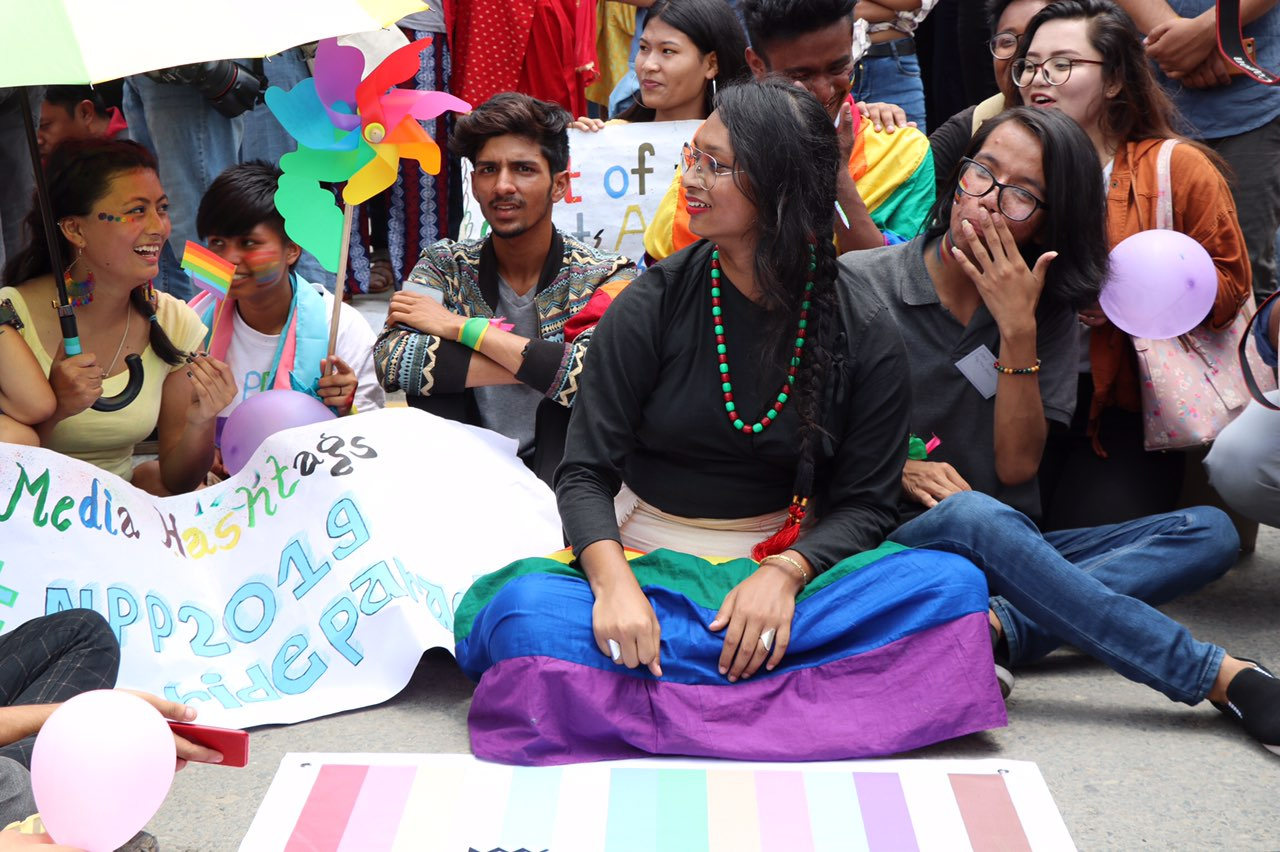

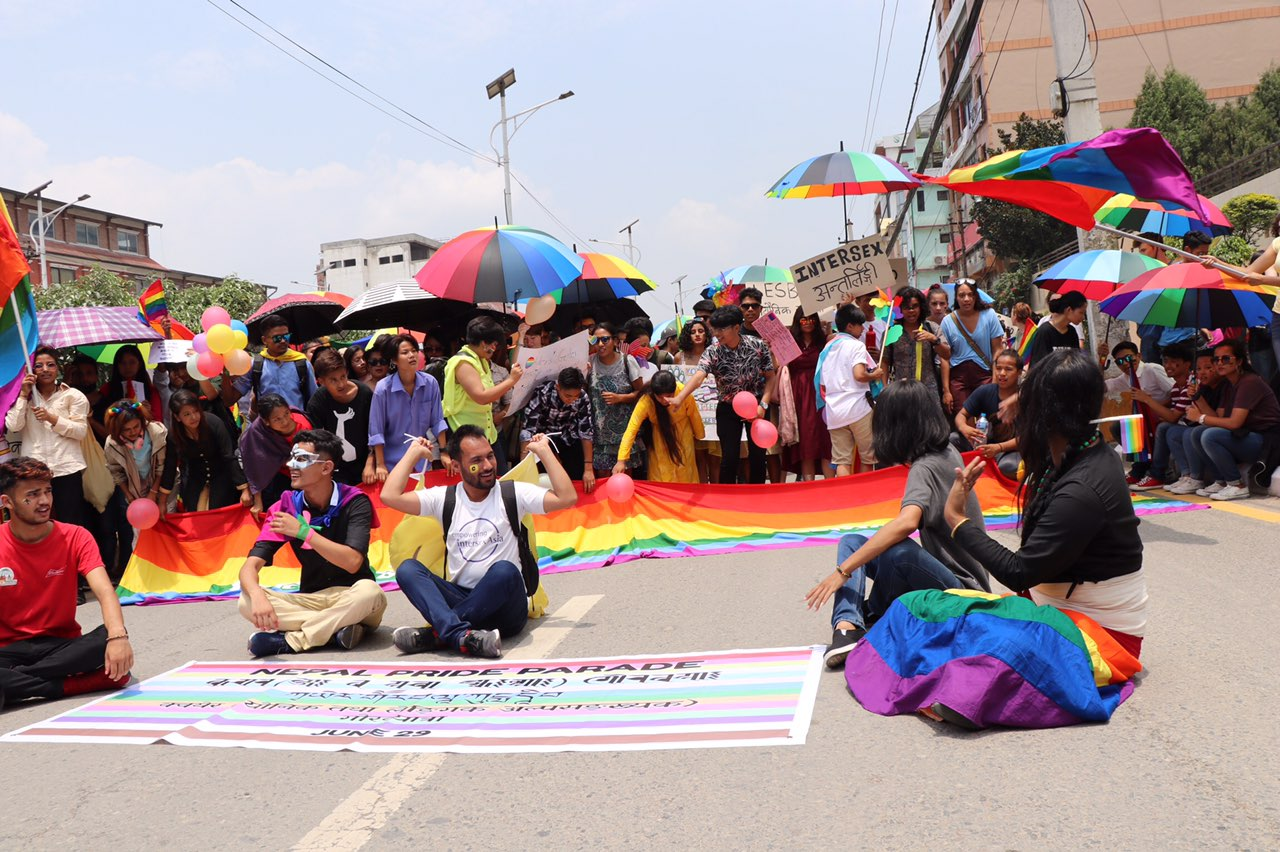

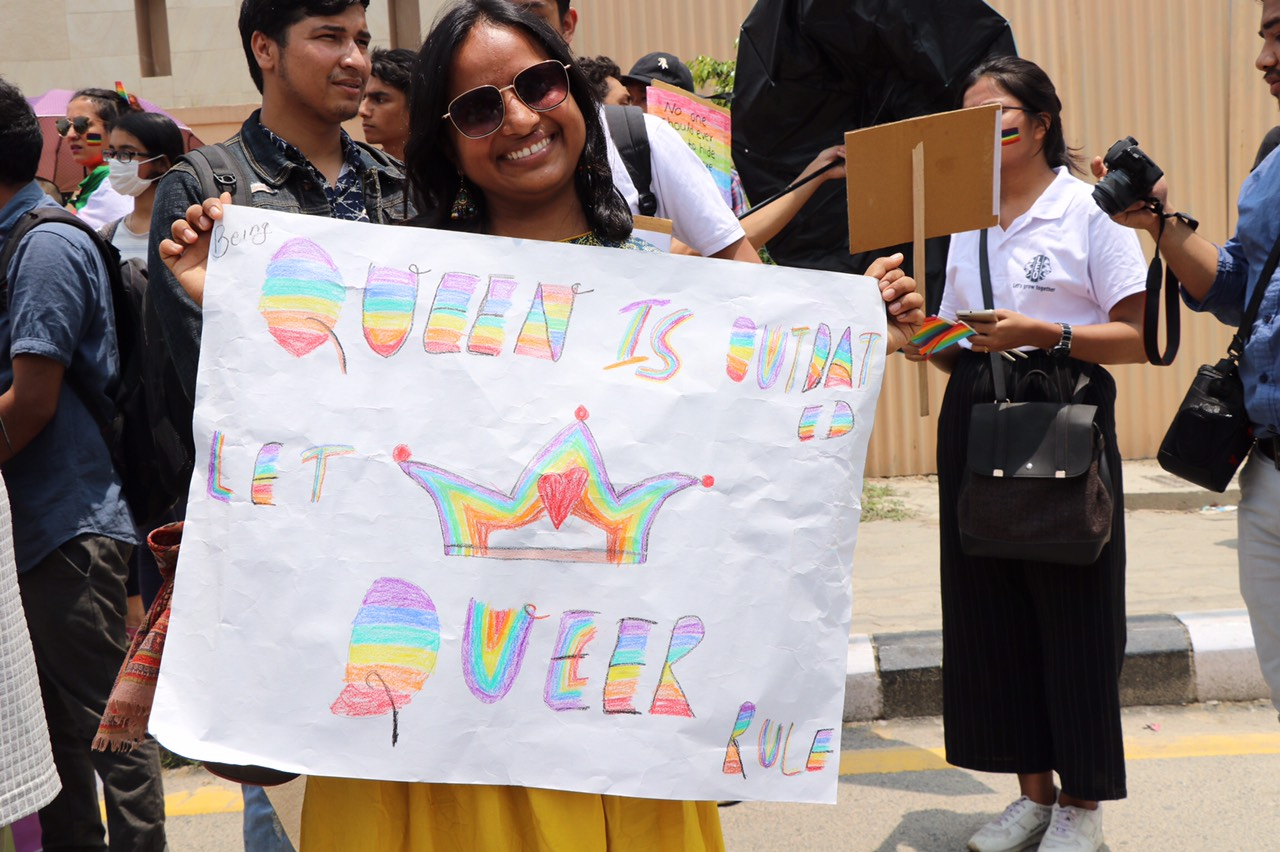

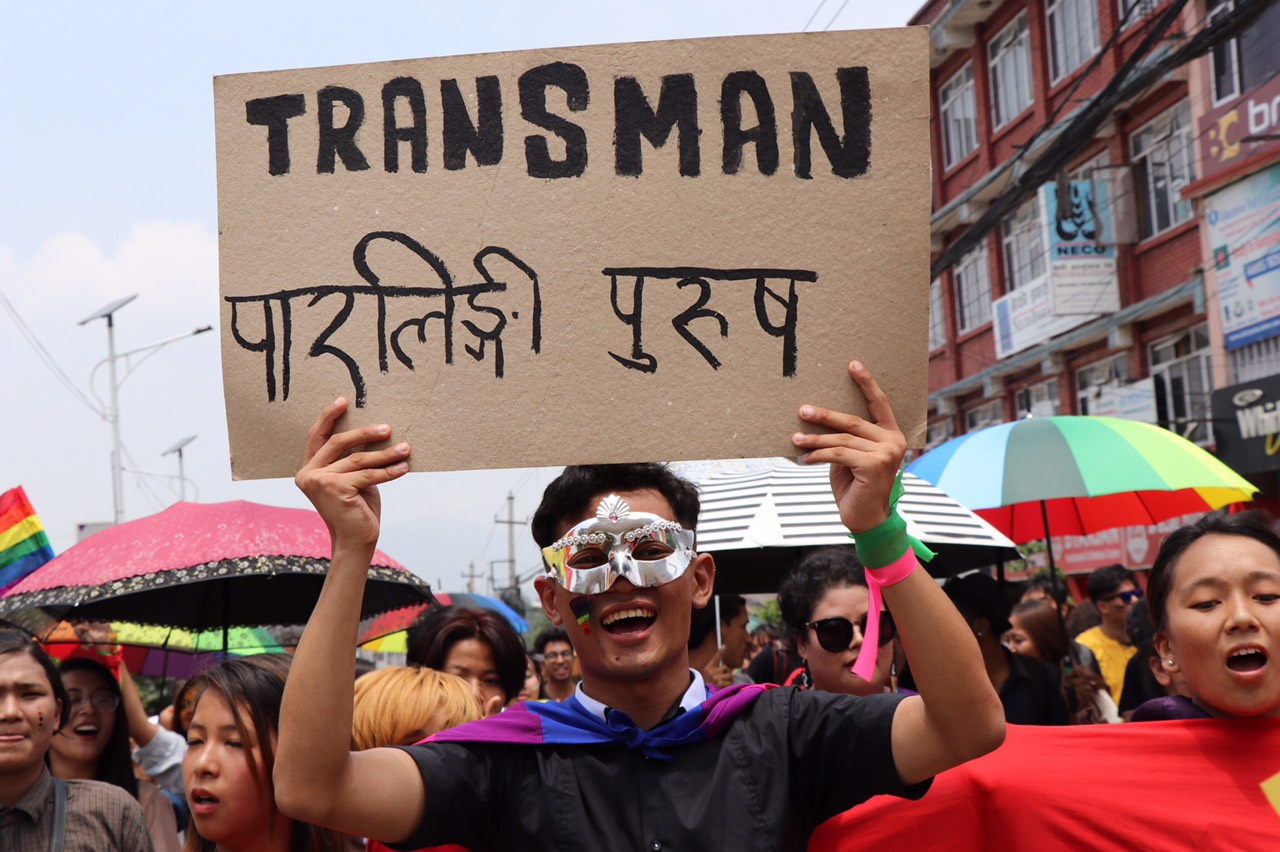

== See also ==
- LGBT rights in Nepal
- Blue Diamond Society
