= Dhumbarahi =

Dhumbarahi धुमबाराही
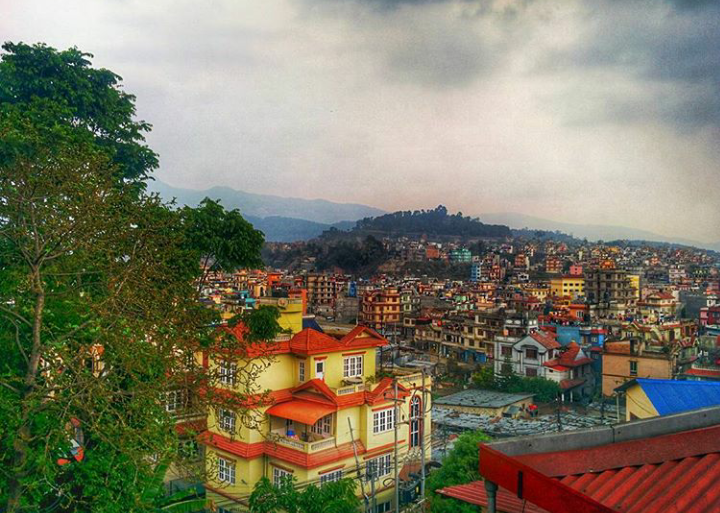
- Country: Nepal
- Development Region: Central
- Zone: Bagmati Zone
- District: Kathmandu District
- census

Languages
  - Local: Nepal Bhasa, Sherpa, Tamang, Gurung, Magar, Kiranti, Tibetan, Nepali
  - Official: Nepali, Nepal Bhasa, English

Dhumbarahi is a place located in the Kathmandu district of Nepal. The name of the place is derived from the temple of Dhumra Barah, thus the name Dhumbarahi.

== Dhumbarahi Chowk ==
The middle part of Dhumbarahi which is next to the Ring Road.

== Dhumbarahi Height ==
Dhumbarahi Height is a small upland just on the left towards Dhumbarahi Chowk.
