= List of heads of state of Nepal =

The following is a list of the heads of state of Nepal, from the unification of the country and the founding of the Kingdom of Nepal in 1768, to the establishment of the Federal Democratic Republic of Nepal in 2008.

The King of Nepal was the country's head of state from the unification and the establishment of the kingdom in 1768 to 2008. Since 2008, the head of state has been the President of Nepal after the abolition of monarchy and the establishment of a republic.

== Kingdom of Nepal (1768–2008) ==
Nepal was ruled by monarchs of the Shah dynasty from 1768 till the abolition of monarchy in 2008. However, from 1846 until the 1950–1951 revolution, the country was de facto ruled by the hereditary prime ministers of the Rana dynasty, reducing the role of the Shah monarch to that of a figurehead. The monarchy was abolished on 28 May 2008 by the 1st Constituent Assembly.

No.	Portrait	King (Birth–Death)	Reign			House	Claim
No.	Portrait	King (Birth–Death)	Reign start	Reign end	Duration	House	Claim
1		Prithvi Narayan Shah पृथ्वीनारायण शाह (1723–1775)	25 September 1768	11 January 1775	6 years, 108 days	Shah	King of the Gorkha Kingdom since 1743
2		Pratap Singh Shah प्रतापसिंह शाह (1751–1777)	11 January 1775	17 November 1777	2 years, 310 days	Shah	Son of Prithvi Narayan Shah
3		Rana Bahadur Shah रणबहादुर शाह (1775–1806)	17 November 1777	8 March 1799 (abdicated)	21 years, 111 days	Shah	Son of Pratap Singh Shah
4		Girvan Yuddha Bikram Shah गीर्वाणयुद्ध विक्रम शाह (1797–1816)	8 March 1799	20 November 1816	17 years, 257 days	Shah	Son of Rana Bahadur Shah
5		Rajendra Bikram Shah राजेन्द्र विक्रम शाह (1813–1881)	20 November 1816	12 May 1847 (abdicated)	30 years, 173 days	Shah	Son of Girvan Yuddha Bikram Shah
6		Surendra Bikram Shah सुरेन्द्र विक्रम शाह (1829–1881)	12 May 1847	17 May 1881	34 years, 5 days	Shah	Son of Rajendra Bikram Shah
7		Prithvi Bir Bikram Shah पृथ्वी वीर विक्रम शाह (1875–1911)	17 May 1881	11 December 1911	30 years, 208 days	Shah	Grandson of Surendra Bikram Shah
8		Tribhuvan Bir Bikram Shah त्रिभुवन वीर विक्रम शाह (1906–1955)	11 December 1911	7 November 1950 (went into exile)	38 years, 331 days	Shah	Son of Prithvi Bir Bikram Shah
9		Gyanendra Bir Bikram Shah ज्ञानेन्द्र वीर विक्रम शाह (born 1947)	7 November 1950	7 January 1951 (stepped down)	61 days	Shah	Grandson of Tribhuvan Bir Bikram Shah
(8)		Tribhuvan Bir Bikram Shah त्रिभुवन वीर विक्रम शाह (1906–1955)	7 January 1951	13 March 1955	4 years, 65 days	Shah	Son of Prithvi Bir Bikram Shah
10		Mahendra Bir Bikram Shah महेन्द्र वीर विक्रम शाह (1920–1972)	14 March 1955	31 January 1972	16 years, 323 days	Shah	Son of Tribhuvan Bir Bikram Shah
11		Birendra Bir Bikram Shah वीरेन्द्र वीर विक्रम शाह (1945–2001)	31 January 1972 (Note: Crowned on 24 February 1975.)	1 June 2001 (assassinated)	29 years, 121 days	Shah	Son of Mahendra Bir Bikram Shah
12		Dipendra Bir Bikram Shah दीपेन्द्र वीर विक्रम शाह (1971–2001)	1 June 2001	4 June 2001 (declared braindead)	3 days (Note: Reigned whilst in a coma, following the royal massacre.)	Shah	Son of Birendra Bir Bikram Shah
(9)		Gyanendra Bir Bikram Shah ज्ञानेन्द्र वीर विक्रम शाह (born 1947)	4 June 2001 (Note: Served as regent for Dipendra Bir Bikram Shah, from 1–4 June 2001.)	28 May 2008 (deposed)	6 years, 359 days	Shah	Son of Mahendra Bir Bikram Shah

=== Transitional period (State of Nepal, 2007–2008) ===
Under the interim constitution adopted in January 2007, all powers of governance were removed from the king, and the Constituent Assembly elected in 2008 was to decide in its first meeting whether to continue the monarchy or to declare a republic. During the suspension of the monarchy, Girija Prasad Koirala, then Prime Minister of Nepal, acted as the Head of State. On 28 May 2008, the Assembly voted to abolish the monarchy. Ram Baran Yadav was elected by the Constituent Assembly, and was sworn in as the nation's first president on 23 July 2008.

Status: Denotes Acting Head of State

No.	Portrait	Name	Took office	Left office	Time in office	Party
–	Girija Prasad Koirala	Girija Prasad Koirala (गिरिजाप्रसाद कोइराला) (1924–2010); Acting	15 January 2007	23 July 2008	1 year, 190 days (Note: Simultaneously served as Prime Minister, from 25 April 2006 – 18 August 2008.)	Congress

== Federal Democratic Republic of Nepal (2008–present) ==
No.	Portrait	President	Took office	Left office	Time in office	Party	Election
1	Ram Baran Yadav	Ram Baran Yadav (रामवरण यादव) (born 1948)	23 July 2008	29 October 2015	7 years, 98 days	Congress	2008
2	Bidya Devi Bhandari	Bidya Devi Bhandari (विद्यादेवी भण्डारी) (born 1961) (Note: First woman to hold this office.)	29 October 2015	13 March 2023	7 years, 135 days	CPN (UML)	2015; 2018
3	Ram Chandra Paudel	Ram Chandra Paudel (राम चन्द्र पौडेल) (born 1944)	13 March 2023	Incumbent	3 years, 241 days	Congress	2023

== See also ==
- History of Nepal
- King of Nepal
- President of Nepal
