= Tribhuvan of Nepal =

King of Nepal (1911–1950; 1951–1955)

Tribhuvan
- Shri Panch Maharajadhiraja
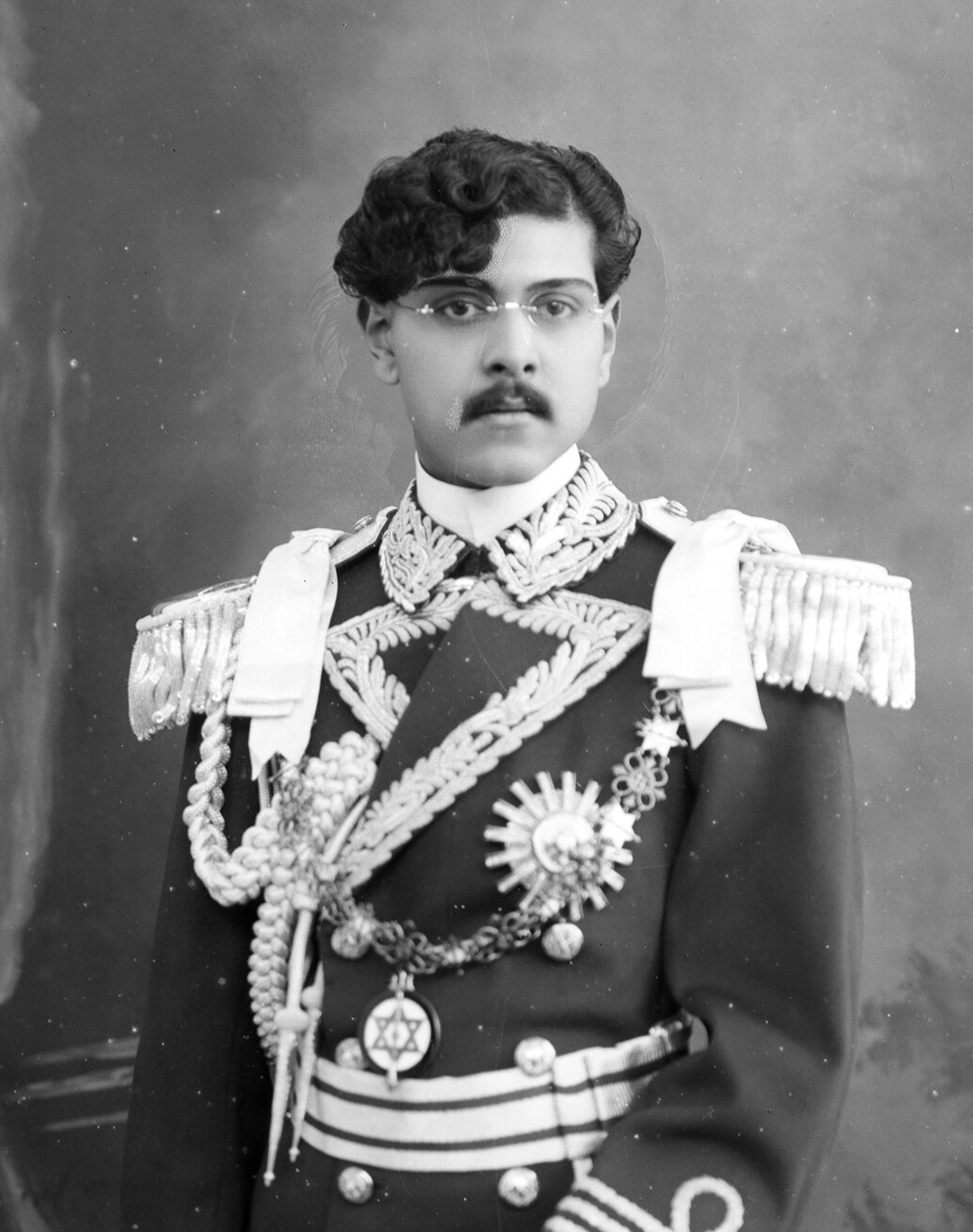
- Formal portrait, 1930s

King of Nepal
- Reign: 12 December 1911 – 7 November 1950
- Coronation: 20 February 1913
- Predecessor: Prithvi Shah
- Regent: Gyanendra Shah
- Prime Ministers: See list: Chandra Shumsher; Bhim Shumsher; Juddha Shumsher; Padma Shumsher; Mohan Shumsher
- Reign: 18 February 1951 – 13 March 1955
- Predecessor: Himself
- Successor: Mahendra Shah
- Prime Minister: M. P. Koirala
- Born: 30 June 1906; Narayanhiti Palace, Kingdom of Nepal
- Died: 13 March 1955 (aged 48); Zürich, Switzerland
- Spouse: Kanti Shah (1st wife); Ishwari Shah
- Issue (among others): King Mahendra; Prince Himalaya; Prince Basundhara; Princess Trilokya; Princess Nalini; Princess Vijaya; Princess Bharati
Regnal name
- Nepali: श्री ५ महाराजाधिराज त्रिभुवन वीर विक्रम शाह; Shri Panch Maharajadhiraja Tribhuvan Bir Bikram Shah
- Dynasty: Shah
- Father: Prithvi Shah
- Mother: Divyeshwari Shah
- Religion: Hinduism

Shree Panch Tribhuvan Bir Bikram Shah (Note: Nepali: त्रिभुवन वीर विक्रम शाह) (30 June 1906 – 13 March 1955), was King of Nepal from 1911 until his death in 1955, excluding a brief period of exile between November 1950 and January 1951.

Born in Kathmandu, the capital city of Nepal, he ascended to the throne at the age of five, upon the death of his father, Prithvi Bir Bikram Shah, and was crowned on 20 February 1913 at the Nasal Chowk, Hanuman Dhoka Palace in Kathmandu, with his mother acting as regent. At the time of his coronation, the position of monarch was largely ceremonial, with the Rana dynasty exercising de facto power.

== Personal life ==
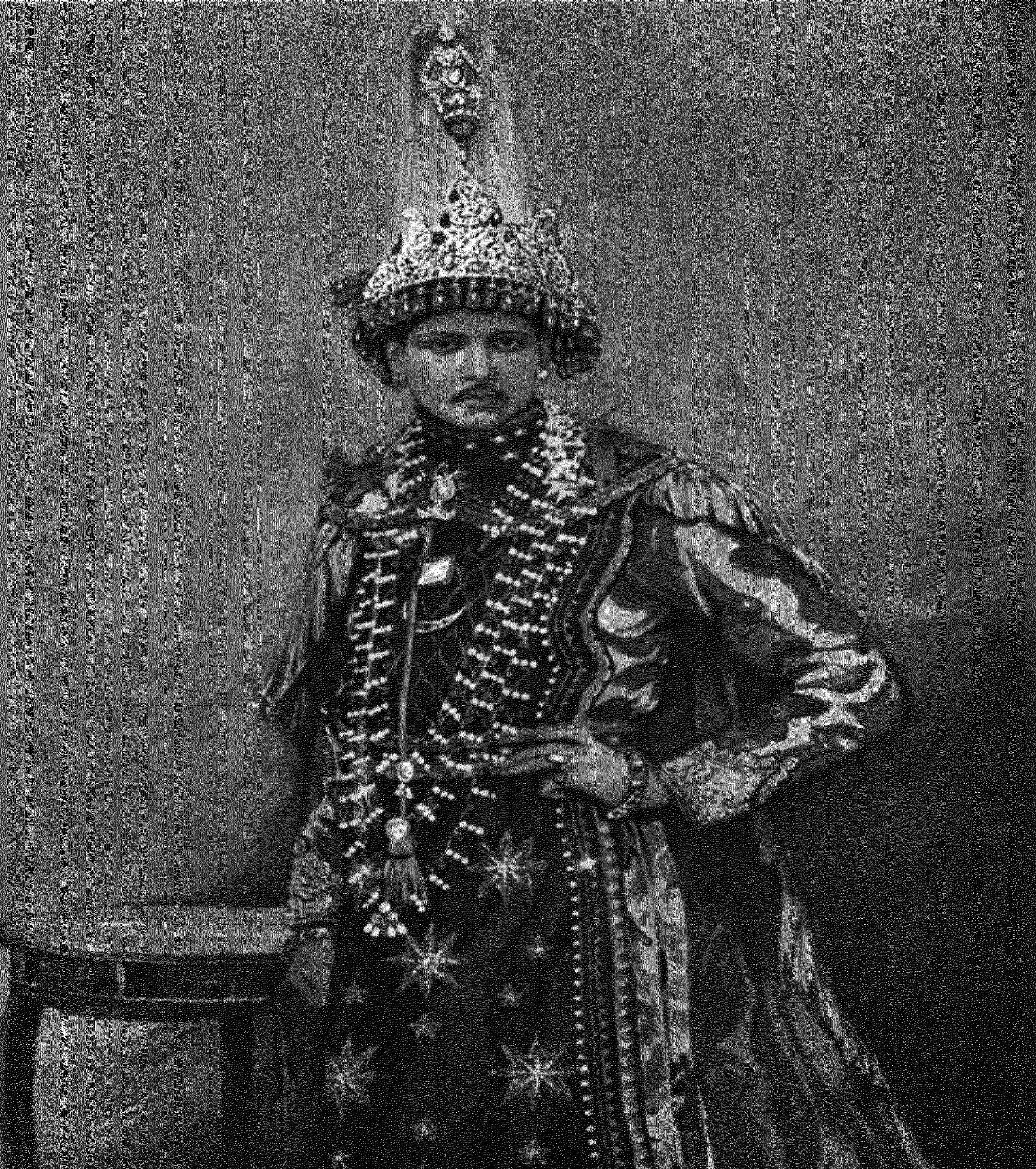
King Tribhuvan in his youth

Tribhuvan had tattoos from his neck to the ankles, including a snake on the biceps of the right arm and on his body, images of ferns, flowers and peacock feathers. Green was his favorite color. Many of his ornaments, keys, gifts, clothes had the word "T" inscribed on them. He frequently ordered by mail through mail order catalogs. He smoked Lucky Strike cigarettes.

Tribhuvan was summoned to Singha Durbar every Thursday and kept waiting for hours for a visit with the Rana Prime Minister.

== Family ==
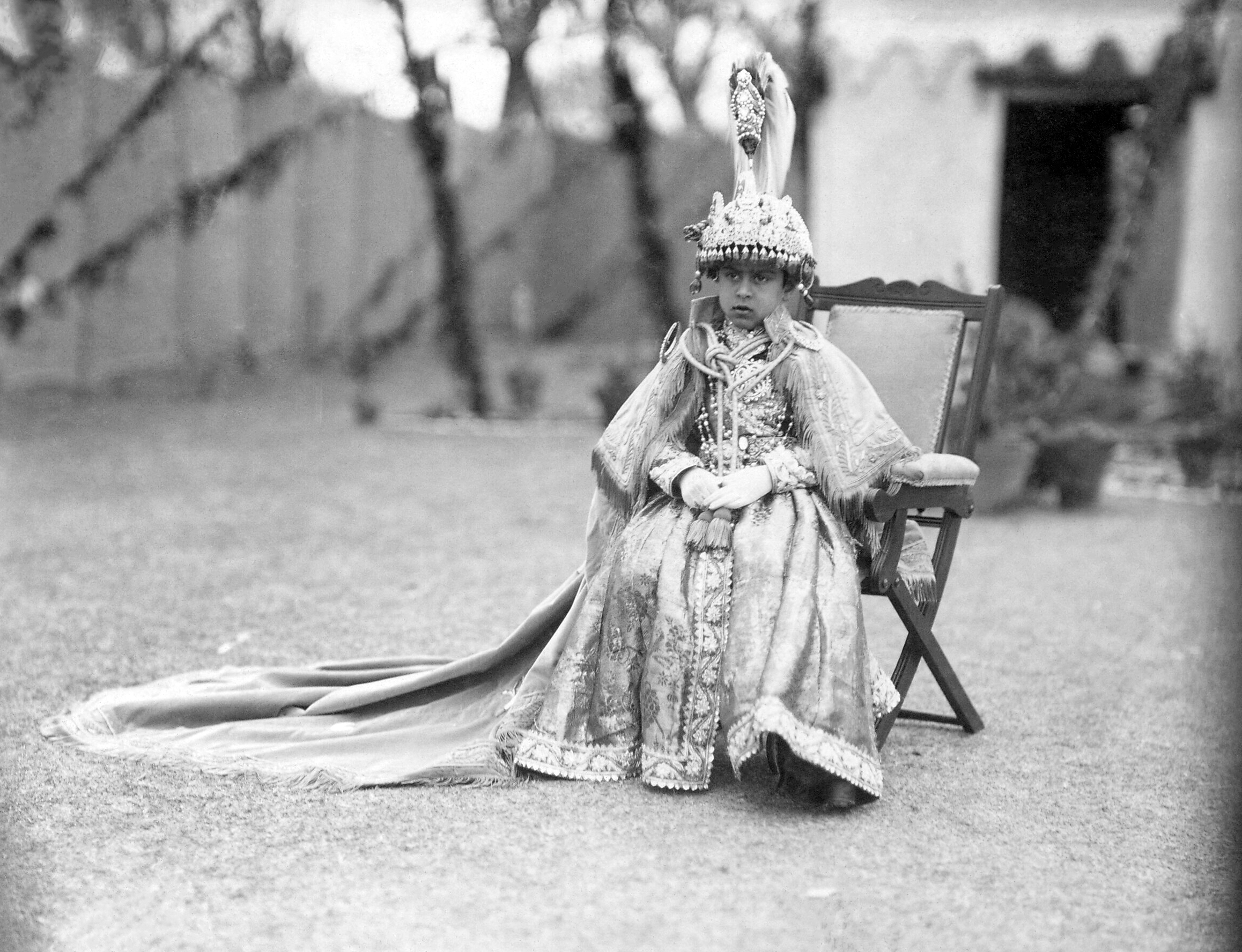
Coronation of Tribhuvan; aged five

Tribhuvan was born on 30 June 1906 to Prithvi Bir Bikram Shah and Divyeshwari Lakshmi Devi Shah. After the death of his father, Tribhuvan ascended the throne on 11 December 1911, at the age of five. Queen Mother Divyeshwari Lakshmi Devi was appointed regent until Tribhuvan came of age.

He married at age 12 in a double ceremony. He married first at the Narayanhity Palace in March 1919 to Kanti. The same day he also married Kanti's sister Ishwari. He also had junior wives.

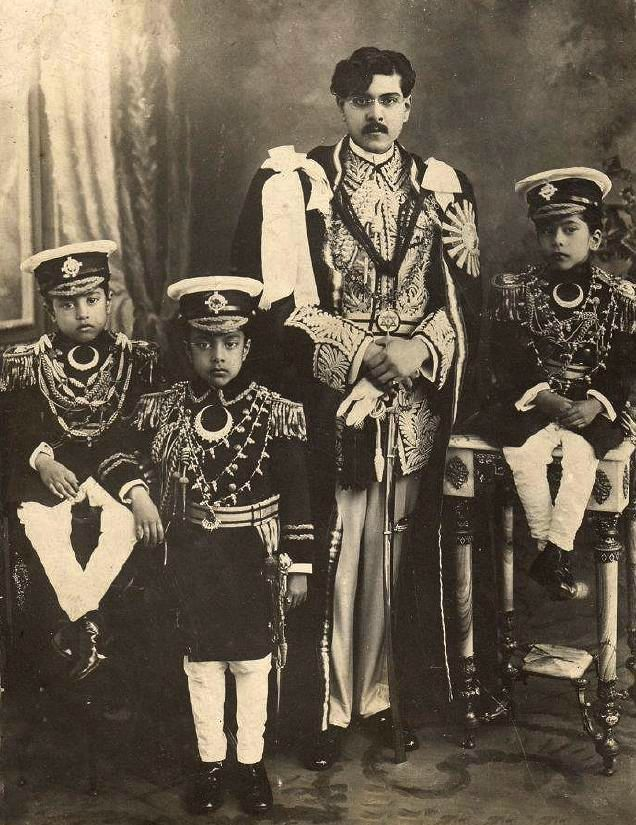
King Tribhuvan and sons; King Mahendra, Prince Basundhara, and Prince Himalaya Pratap

His first child and successor to the throne, Mahendra Bir Bikram Shah Dev, was born when both Tribhuvan and his wife, Queen Kanti Rajya Lakshmi Devi Shah, were just 13 years old, on 11 June 1920.

== Later life ==
Tensions between the royal family and the Ranas began during World War I. The Ranas wanted to join the war in support of Britain. The Shahs were reluctant and wished to remain neutral. The then prime minister, Chandra Shamsher Jang Bahadur Rana, pressured the young king and threatened his mother, eventually forcing Tribhuvan to order the troops to war.

By the mid-1930s, popular discontent with the Ranas led to the establishment of several movements, notably the Nepal Praja Parishad, to which Tribhuvan himself gave his explicit support, to overthrow the Ranas. In each instance, however, the Ranas responded harshly, banning the liberal movements and executing their leaders. Tribhuvan worked closely with the Praja Parishad to abolish the Rana regime.

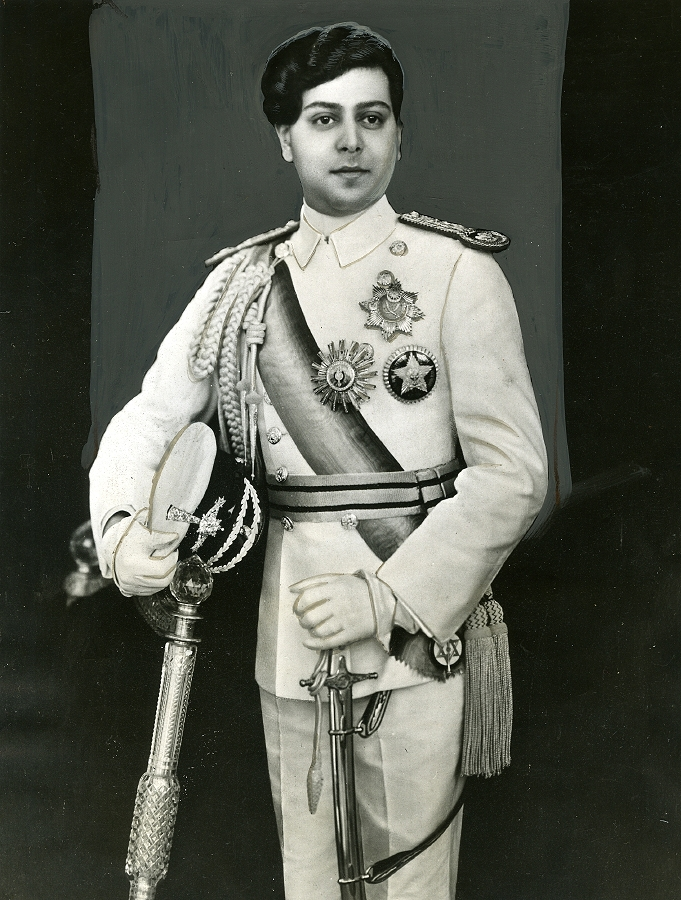
King Tribhuvan, 1937

In November 1950, King Tribhuvan took refuge at the Indian Embassy. He was accompanied by his son Mahendra and the eldest grandson Birendra, among others. The then prime minister, Mohan Shamsher Jang Bahadur Rana became furious and responded to Tribhuvan's move by calling an emergency meeting of the cabinet on 7 November 1950 at Singha Durbar. In that meeting he announced Gyanendra Bir Bikram Shah, the four-year-old grandson of Tribhuvan, as the new King of Nepal. On 10 November, two Indian planes landed at Gauchar Airport (now called Tribhuvan International Airport) and the royal family fled to New Delhi excluding the infant King, Gyanendra. Tribhuvan was formally welcomed by Indian prime minister Jawahar Lal Nehru and other high officials.

The removal of the king led to huge demonstrations in the country that compelled the Rana prime minister, Mohan Shamsher Jang Bahadur Rana to negotiate with Tribhuvan and the Nepali Congress. On 22 November 1950, Jawahar Lal Nehru, the prime minister of India, officially announced that India was not going to recognize Gyanendra Bir Bikram Shah as the legitimate King of Nepal.

When Mohan Shumsher saw that the situation was out of his control, he sent the king's brother-in-law, Sir Kaiser Shamsher Jang Bahadur Rana and Bijaya Shamsher Jang Bahadur Rana to New Delhi for peace talks. In New Delhi, King Tribhuvan, representatives of the Nepali Congress and the Rana Government all sat together to discuss the situation. At last an agreement was reached according in which King Tribhuvan was to form a new ministry, under his leadership, consisting of the Nepali Congress and the Ranas on an equal basis.

Tribhuvan then flew back to Nepal, along with the members of the royal family and the leaders of the Congress Party on 15 February 1951. On 18 February 1951, Tribhuvan returned from India as the monarch. Three days after the return, Tribhuvan formally declared an end to Rana's family rule and established a democratic system, but Mohan Shumsher Jung Bahadur Rana continued as the prime minister for a few more months.

== Congress – Rana Government ==
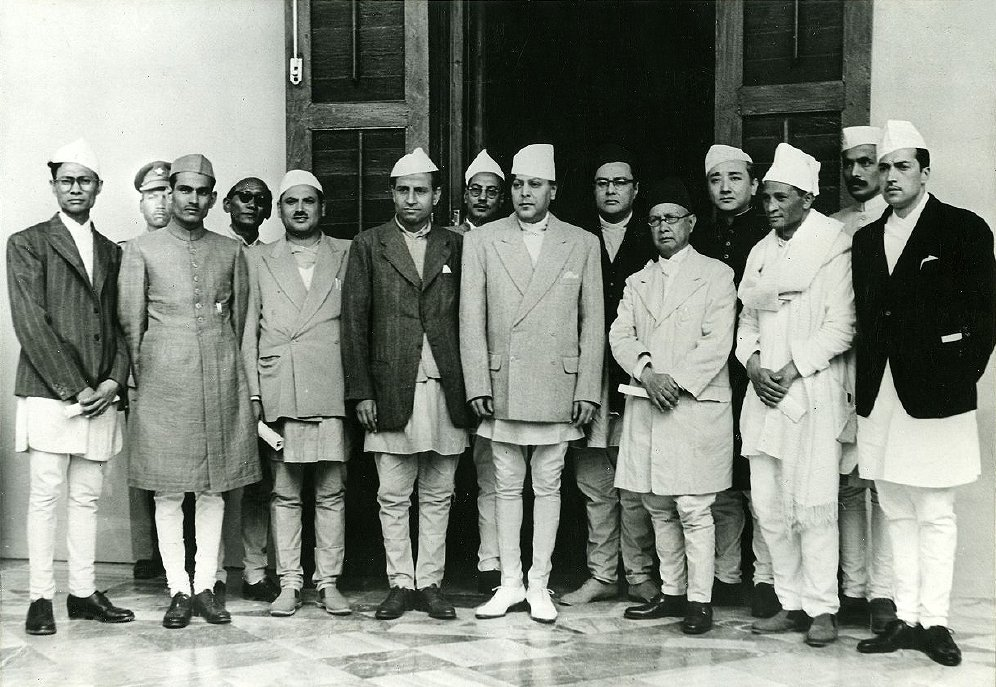
King Tribhuvan and Nepali Congress

According to the New Delhi Agreement, Tribhuvan announced on 13 February 1951, a cabinet headed by Mohan Shamsher Jang Bahadur Rana. The following were the members of the Cabinet.

From the Rana clan:

- Sir Mohan Shamsher – Prime minister and Foreign Affairs.
- Sir Baber Shamsher Jang Bahadur Rana- (younger brother of Mohan Shamsher; was in line for the next premiership) – Defence.
- Chudraj Shamsher – ("B" class Rana representative) – Forests.
- Nripa Janga Rana – ("C" class Rana representative) – Education.
- Yagya Bahadur Basnyat – (Rana Bhardar) – Health and Local self-government.

From the Nepali Congress side:

- Bishweshwar Prasad Koirala – Home.
- Subarna Shamsher Rana- (even though a Rana, he represented the Nepali Congress) – Finance.
- Ganesh Man Singh – Commerce and Industry
- Bharatmani Sharma – Food and Agriculture
- Bhadrakali Mishra – Transport.

This cabinet was reshuffled on 10 June 1951 to replace Baber Shamsher by Shangha Shamsher and Bharatmani Sharma by Surya Prasad Upadhyaya. This cabinet was dissolved in November 1951 and Matrika Prasad Koirala became the new prime minister.

== Death ==
Tribhuvan died at 3pm (GMT +2) March 9, 1955 at a clinic in Zürich, Switzerland. He was 49. His body was taken away from the clinic at 7:15pm, March 16 to the airport en route to Gauchar, Kathmandu. He was succeeded by his eldest legitimate son, Mahendra.

== Legacy ==
The international airport in Kathmandu, Tribhuvan International Airport, the oldest highway in Nepal Tribhuvan Highway, the 2nd oldest association football tournament in Nepal, Tribhuvan Challenge Shield, a city, Tribhuvannagar in Dang valley, and the country's largest university (Tribhuvan University) are named after him.

== Issue ==
King Tribhuvan had two legally wedded wives, both of whom were crowned queen consorts in 1919. All his legitimate children were born from these unions.

=== Children born to Queen Kanti ===
Tribhuvan married Kanti Rajya Lakshmi Devi Shah (1906–1973) in 1919; she was crowned senior queen consort. They had five children:

- King Mahendra of Nepal (11 June 1920 – 31 January 1972). He succeeded his father as king and was married first to Indra Rajya Lakshmi Devi Shah and later to Ratna Rajya Lakshmi Devi Shah. He had children by his first wife.
- Prince Himalaya of Nepal (12 October 1921 – 2 May 1980). He married Princep Rajya Lakshmi Devi. The couple had no children.
- Princess Trilokya (1922 – 1990). She married Hardyal Singh, the prince of Sikar in India, and adopted a son.
- Princess Vijaya (1925 – 1992). She never married.
- Princess Bharati (1927 – 2020). She married Pradeep Chandra Bhanj Deo, the Maharaja of Mayurbhanj, and had children.

=== Children born to Queen Ishwari ===
Tribhuvan’s second wife was Ishwari Rajya Lakshmi Devi Shah (1907–1983), a sister of his first wife. They married in a double ceremony. She was crowned junior queen consort in 1919. They had two children:

- Prince Basundhara of Nepal (4 November 1921 – 31 August 1977). He married Helen Rajya Lakshmi Devi and had issue.
- Princess Nalini (1924 – 2020). She married Raja Shiv Rattan Dev Singh of Poonch and had children.

== Honours ==
National

- Sovereign of the Order of Ojaswi Rajanya
- Sovereign of the Order of Nepal Taradisha
- Sovereign of the Order of Gorkha Dakshina Bahu
- Sovereign of the Order of Tri Shakti Patta

Foreign

- (Kingdom of Afghanistan) Grand Cordon of the Order of the Supreme Sun, 1 March 1950
- (Italy) Grand Cross of the Order of Merit of Italian Republic, 16 October 1954
- (France) Grand Cross of the Legion of Honour, 1954

== Ancestry ==
In addition to his Thakuri royal lineage from Prithvi Narayan Shah, he is also a descendant of popular personalities such as Jang Bahadur Kunwar Ranaji, Kaji Tularam Pande, Sardar Ramakrishna Kunwar and Kaji General Amar Singh Thapa, after the Rana dynasty arranged a way to marry into the royal family.

Ancestors of Tribhuvan of Nepal

8. King Surendra Bikram Shah of Nepal
4. Trailokya, Crown Prince of Nepal
9. Trailokya Rajya Lakshmi Devi of Nepal
2. King Prithvi Bir Bikram Shah Dev of Nepal
10. Jang Bahadur Kunwar Ranaji, 1st Maharaja of Lamjung and Kaski
5. Queen Lalit Rajeshwori Rajya Lakshmi Devi of Nepal
11. Hiranyagarbha Kumari Devi, Maharani of Lamjung and Kaski
1. King Tribhuvan Bir Bikram Shah Dev
3. Divyeshwari Rajya Lakshmi Devi of Nepal

== Notes ==
Tribhuvan of Nepal Shah dynasty Born: 30 June 1906 Died: 13 March 1955
Regnal titles
Preceded by Prithvi	King of Nepal; 1911–1950	Succeeded by Gyanendra
Preceded by Gyanendra	King of Nepal; 1951–1955	Succeeded by Mahendra
