= List of monarchs of Nepal =

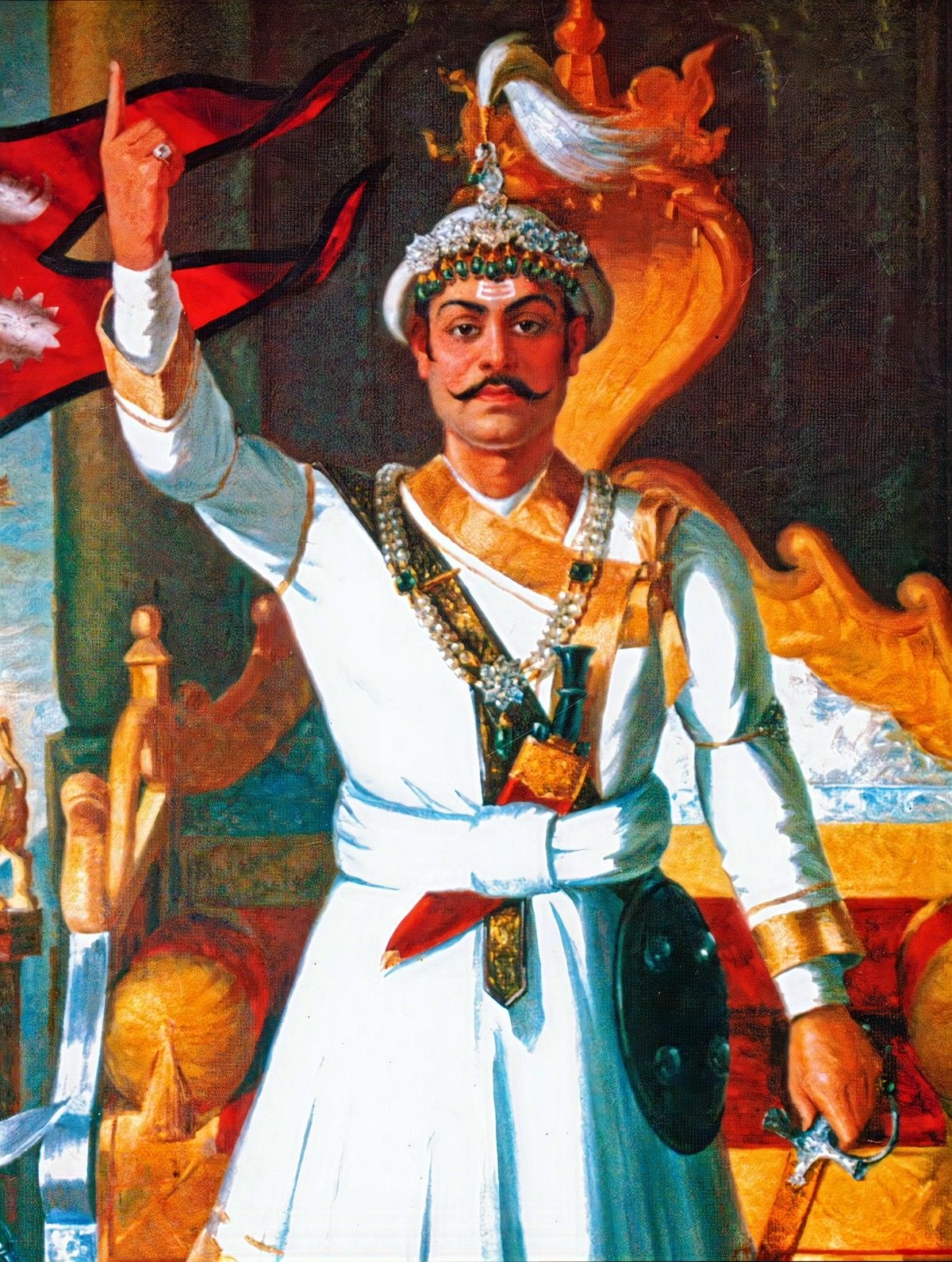
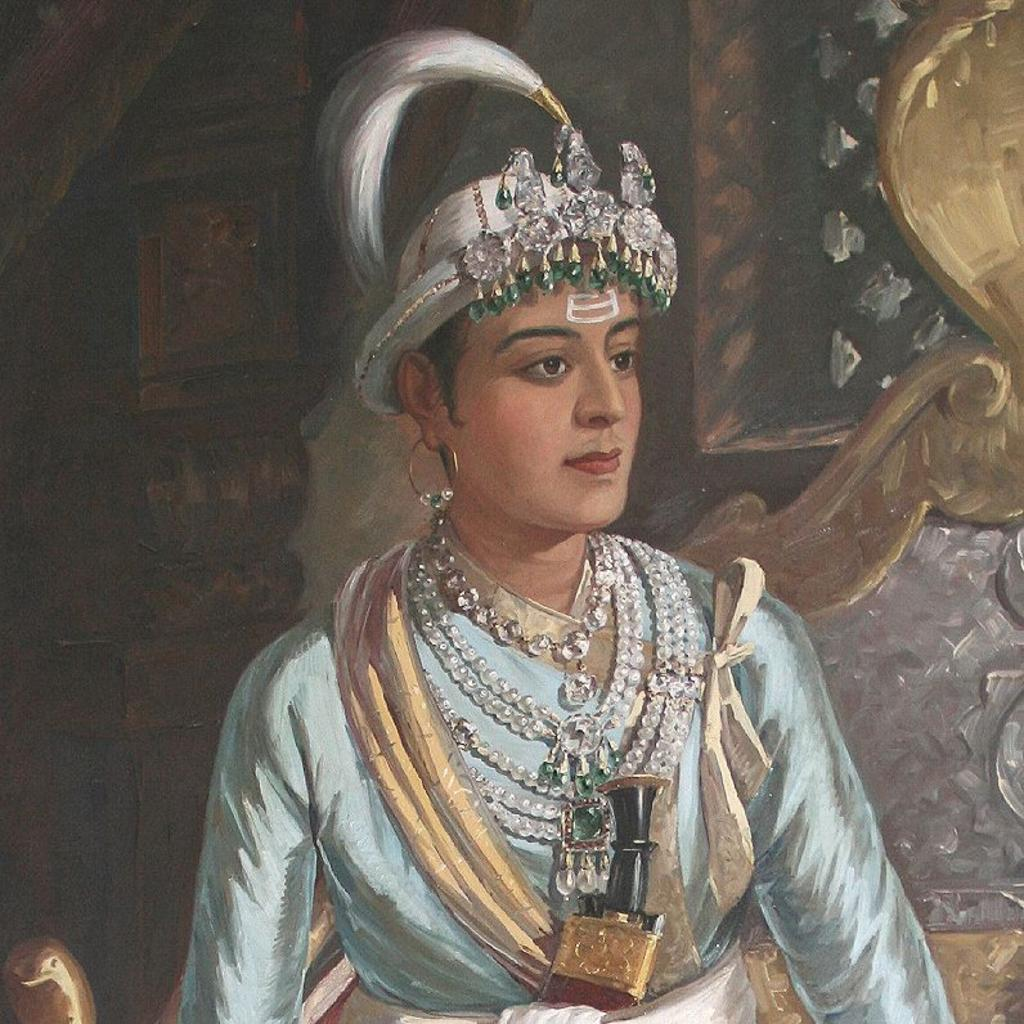
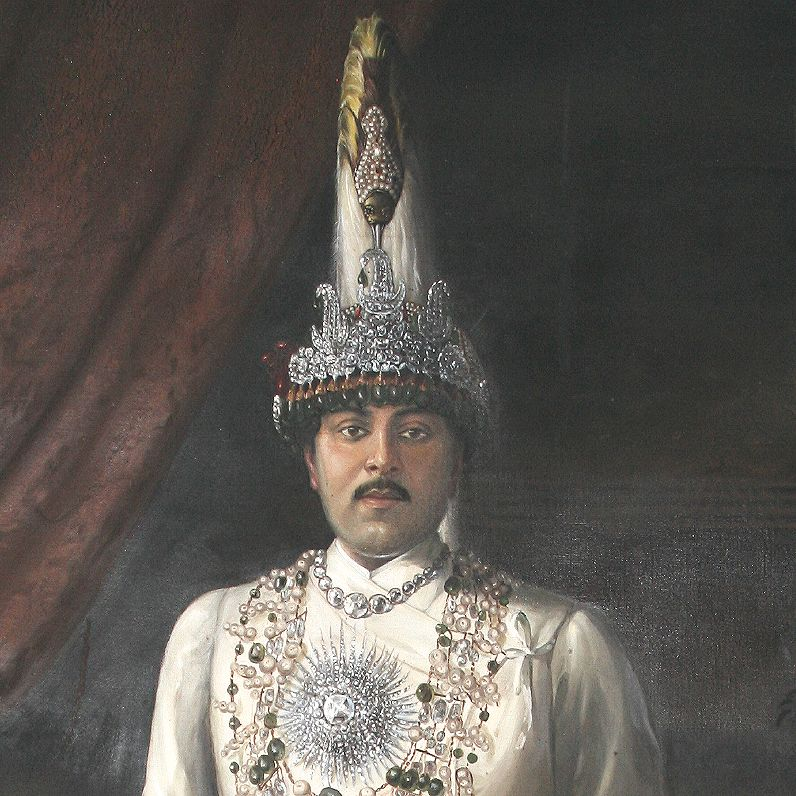
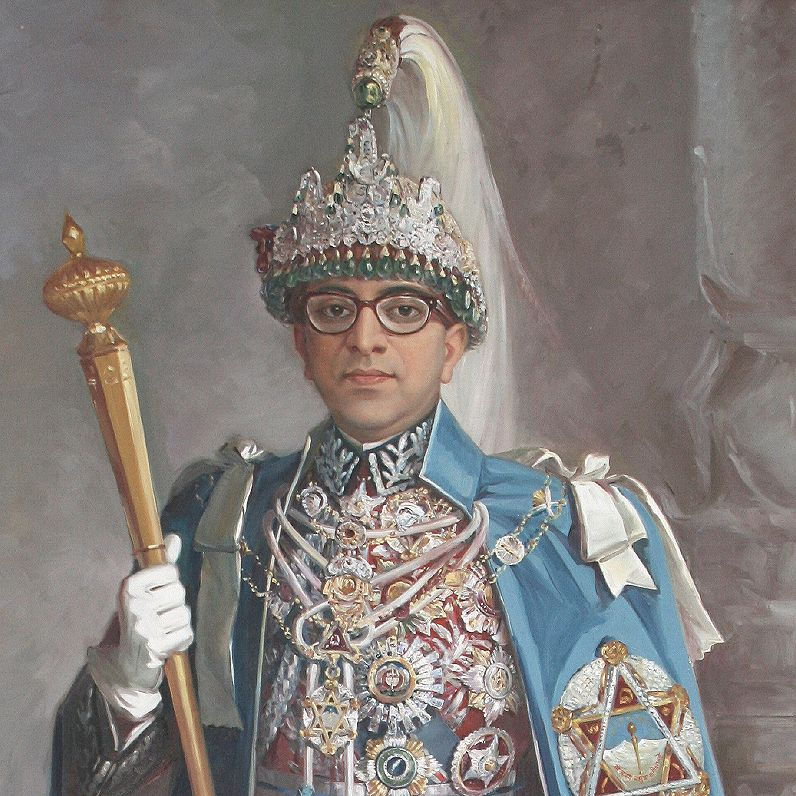
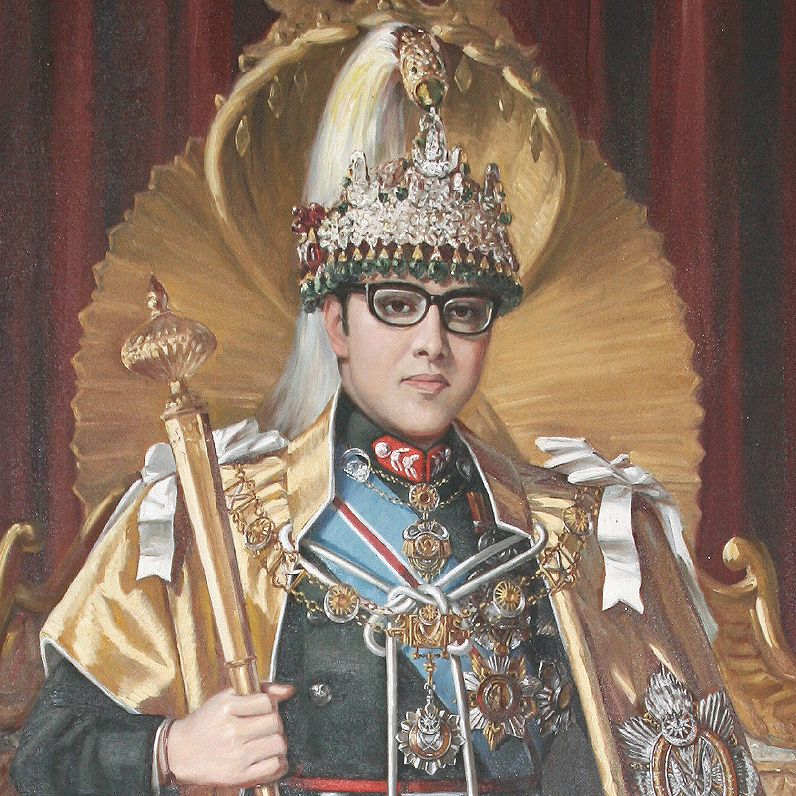
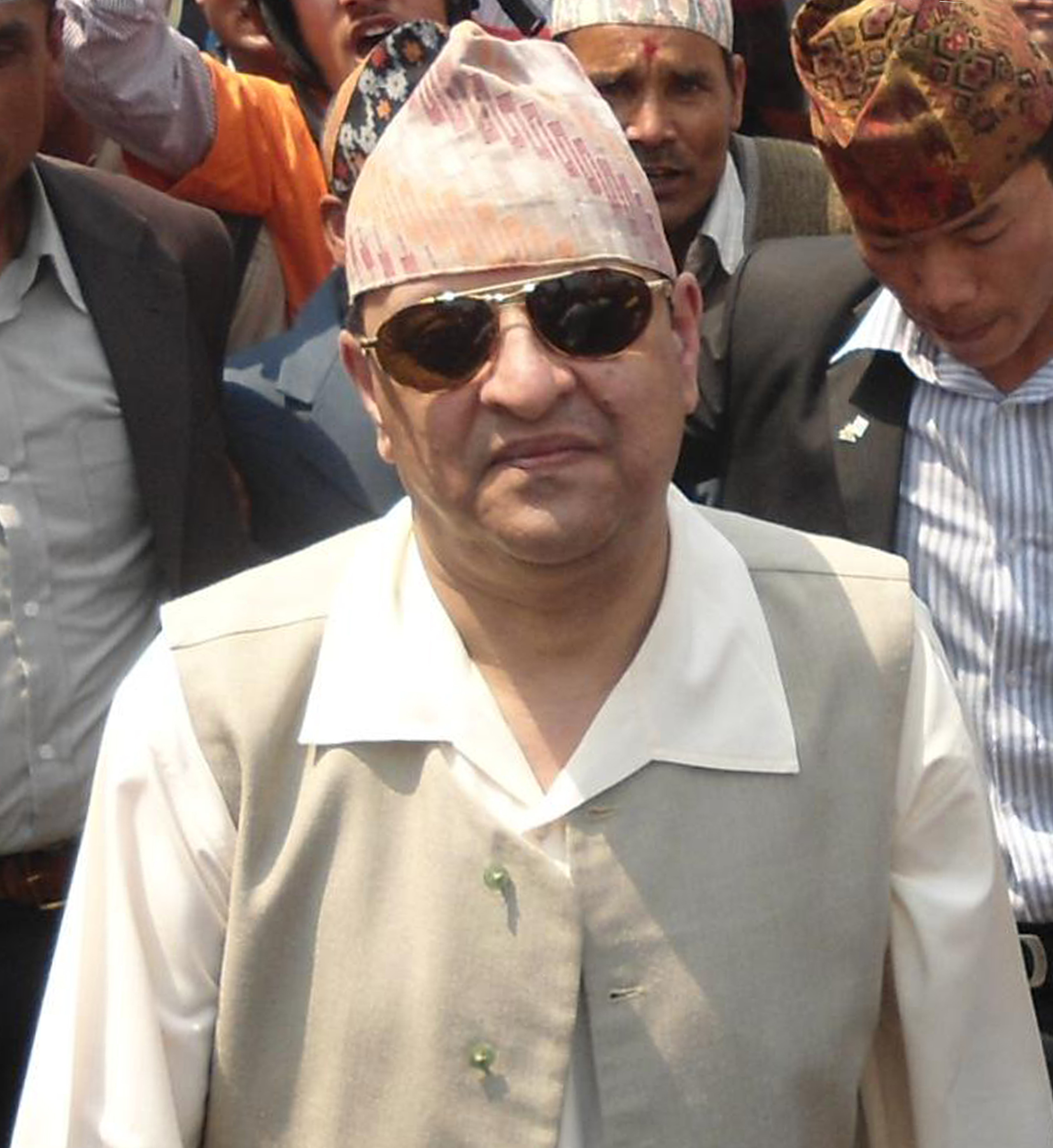
From left to right, top to bottom: (a) Prithvi Narayan Shah, who began the unification process of the present-day country of Nepal; (b) Girvan Yuddha Bikram Shah, during whose reign the British attacked Nepal and forced him to sign the Treaty of Sugauli, which defined the present-day borders; (c) Tribhuvan, who ended the Rana regime and reduced the role of the monarch to that of a figurehead; (d) Mahendra, who began direct rule by the king and introduced the Panchayat system; (e) Birendra, who made the country a constitutional monarchy; (f) Gyanendra, who was deposed and became the last king of Nepal.

The monarchs of Nepal were members of the Shah dynasty who ruled over the Kingdom of Nepal from 1743 to its dissolution in 2008. However, from 1846 until the 1950–1951 revolution, the country was de facto ruled by the hereditary prime ministers from the Rana dynasty, reducing the role of the Shah monarch to that of a figurehead. In November 1990, after the Jana Andolan movement, the new Constitution was adopted and the country became a constitutional monarchy. The monarchy was abolished on 28 May 2008 by the 1st Constituent Assembly and the country was declared a federal parliamentary republic, in the aftermath of the 2006 Loktantra Andolan movement.

== History ==
=== Unification and expansion ===
Prithvi Narayan Shah ascended the throne of the Gorkha Kingdom in 1743 after the death of his father Nara Bhupal Shah. He founded Nepal after invading Nuwakot in 1744, which started the unification process of the present-day country of Nepal. Shah died on 11 January 1775 after ruling for over 31 years; by the end of his reign, he had won over Nuwakot, Makwanpur, and Nepal Valley. Upon Prithvi Narayan's death, his son Pratap Singh Shah was appointed as the king. He died prematurely at the age of 26 in 1777; on the same day, his young son, Rana Bahadur Shah, became king with his mother, Queen Rajendra, and later his uncle, Bahadur Shah, as regent. Later Rana Bahadur abdicated the throne and his illegitimate son Girvan Yuddha Bikram Shah became the king. (Note: The king married Maithili Brahman widow Kantavati Jha after taking an oath to make their illegitimate son the heir apparent. Rana Bahadur Shah had two wives and children before marrying Kantavati. At Girvan Yuddha Bikram Shah's birth, he was declared as the crown prince; within a year of his birth, Kantavati contracted tuberculosis and, in order to see Girvan become the king, Rana Bahadur abdicated the throne and placed his first wife, Raj Rajeshwari, as regent.) During the reign of Girvan, the Anglo-Nepalese War broke out, which ended with the signing of the Treaty of Sugauli in 1816, resulting in Nepal losing a third of its territory. The king died on 20 November 1816 after contracting smallpox.

=== Rana rule ===
Rajendra Bikram Shah succeeded his father at the age of three under the regency of his step-grandmother Queen Lalita Tripura Sundari Devi and Prime Minister Bhimsen Thapa. He declared that he would rule Nepal only with the advice of Rajya Lakshmi Devi and handed her all of his powers, which led to the Kot massacre in 1846. After the massacre, Jung Bahadur Rana rose to power and de facto ruled the country and started the Rana dynasty, which ruled for over a century. The next year, Rajendra was imprisoned by Jung Bahadur at Hanuman Dhoka and his son Surendra Bikram Shah ascended the throne. His powers were limited; he died in 1881, three years after his eldest son, Trailokya. Surendra's grandson Prithvi Bir Bikram Shah became the king, but like his grandfather, he did not have many powers. Prithvi died prematurely at the age of 36, and his five-year-old son, Tribhuvan, succeeded him.

=== Return to power and the Panchayat era ===
In 1950, Tribhuvan went into exile at the Indian Embassy in Kathmandu in a campaign aimed at removing the Ranas from power; in response, Gyanendra, grandson of Tribhuvan, was named the new king of Nepal by the Rana government. Tribhuvan returned to Nepal after a mutual agreement with the Ranas (which ended their rule) and was crowned king again in 1951. Upon Tribhuvan's death, Mahendra became king in 1955. In 1960, he staged a coup d'état and introduced the party-less political system, the Panchayat. In 1972, during a hunting event, Mahendra suffered a heart attack, and his son Birendra assumed the throne; he was crowned in 1975, two years after his father's death.

=== Constitutional monarchy and abolition ===
In 1990, pro-democracy riots broke out in Nepal, resulting in the country becoming a constitutional monarchy. On 1 June 2001, the Nepalese royal family were killed in a mass shooting, including the king, and the government named Birendra's son Dipendra as the perpetrator. Dipendra went into a coma after shooting himself and was declared king while in the coma; he died in hospital three days later. His uncle Gyanendra was crowned again and his reign saw the growing insurgency of the Nepalese Civil War. In 2008, Gyanendra stepped down as the king of Nepal and the country became the Federal Democratic Republic of Nepal.

== Monarchs ==
Name	Lifespan	Reign start	Reign end	Notes	Family	Image
Prithvi Narayan Shah: The Great; पृथ्वीनारायण शाह	11 January 1723 – 11 January 1775 (aged 52)	3 April 1743 (Note: as King of Gorkha Kingdom)	11 January 1775 (31 years, 314 days)	Son of Nara Bhupal Shah	Shah	A king with a crown
Pratap Singh Shah: प्रतापसिंह शाह	16 April 1751 – 17 November 1777 (aged 26)	11 January 1775	17 November 1777 (2 years, 310 days)	Son of Prithvi Narayan Shah	Shah	A king with a crown looking sideways
Rana Bahadur Shah: रणबहादुर शाह	25 May 1775 – 25 April 1806 (aged 30)	17 November 1777	8 March 1799 (21 years, 111 days) (abdicated)	Son of Pratap Singh Shah	Shah	A young king with a crown
Girvan Yuddha Bikram Shah: गीर्वाणयुद्ध विक्रम शाह	19 October 1797 – 20 November 1816 (aged 19)	8 March 1799	20 November 1816 (17 years, 257 days)	Son of Rana Bahadur Shah	Shah	A young king with a crown
Rajendra Bikram Shah: राजेन्द्र विक्रम शाह	3 December 1813 – 10 July 1881 (aged 67)	20 November 1816	12 May 1847 (30 years, 173 days) (abdicated)	Son of Girvan Yuddha Bikram Shah	Shah	A king with a yellow crown with jewellery
Surendra Bikram Shah: सुरेन्द्र विक्रम शाह	October 1829 – 17 May 1881 (aged 51)	12 May 1847	17 May 1881 (34 years, 5 days)	Son of Rajendra Bikram Shah	Shah	A king with a crown looking sideways
Prithvi Bir Bikram Shah: पृथ्वी वीर विक्रम शाह	8 August 1875 – 11 December 1911 (aged 36)	17 May 1881	11 December 1911 (30 years, 208 days)	Grandson of Surendra Bikram Shah	Shah	A king posing for the camera
Tribhuvan Bir Bikram Shah (1st reign): त्रिभुवन वीर विक्रम शाह	30 June 1906 – 13 March 1955 (aged 48)	11 December 1911	7 November 1950 (38 years, 331 days) (went into exile)	Son of Prithvi Bir Bikram Shah	Shah	A king with a military uniform
Gyanendra Bir Bikram Shah (1st reign): ज्ञानेन्द्र वीर विक्रम शाह	7 July 1947 (age 79)	7 November 1950	7 January 1951 (61 days) (stepped down)	Grandson of Tribhuvan Bir Bikram Shah	Shah	A king with a glasses
Tribhuvan Bir Bikram Shah (2nd reign): त्रिभुवन वीर विक्रम शाह	30 June 1906 – 13 March 1955 (aged 48)	7 January 1951	13 March 1955 (4 years, 65 days)	Son of Prithvi Bir Bikram Shah	Shah	A king with a military uniform
Mahendra Bir Bikram Shah: महेन्द्र वीर विक्रम शाह	11 June 1920 – 31 January 1972 (aged 51)	13 March 1955	31 January 1972 (16 years, 324 days)	Son of Tribhuvan Bir Bikram Shah	Shah	A king wearing a crown
Birendra Bir Bikram Shah: वीरेन्द्र वीर विक्रम शाह	28 December 1945 – 1 June 2001 (aged 55)	31 January 1972 (Note: He was officially crowned on 24 February 1975.)	1 June 2001 (29 years, 121 days) (assassinated)	Son of Mahendra Bir Bikram Shah	Shah	A king with a crown
Dipendra Bir Bikram Shah: दीपेन्द्र वीर विक्रम शाह	27 June 1971 – 4 June 2001 (aged 29)	1 June 2001 (Note: Reigned whilst in a coma, following the royal massacre.)	4 June 2001 (3 days) (declared braindead)	Son of Birendra Bir Bikram Shah	Shah	A king wearing glasses
Gyanendra Bir Bikram Shah (2nd reign): ज्ञानेन्द्र वीर विक्रम शाह	7 July 1947 (age 79) – present	4 June 2001	28 May 2008 (6 years, 359 days) (deposed)	Son of Mahendra Bir Bikram Shah	Shah	A king looking at the camera

== See also ==
- List of heads of state of Nepal
- List of prime ministers of Nepal
