= Hiranya Garbha Devi =

Nepalese Maharani and principal wife of Jung Bahadur Rana

- Sri Sri Sri Bada Maharani
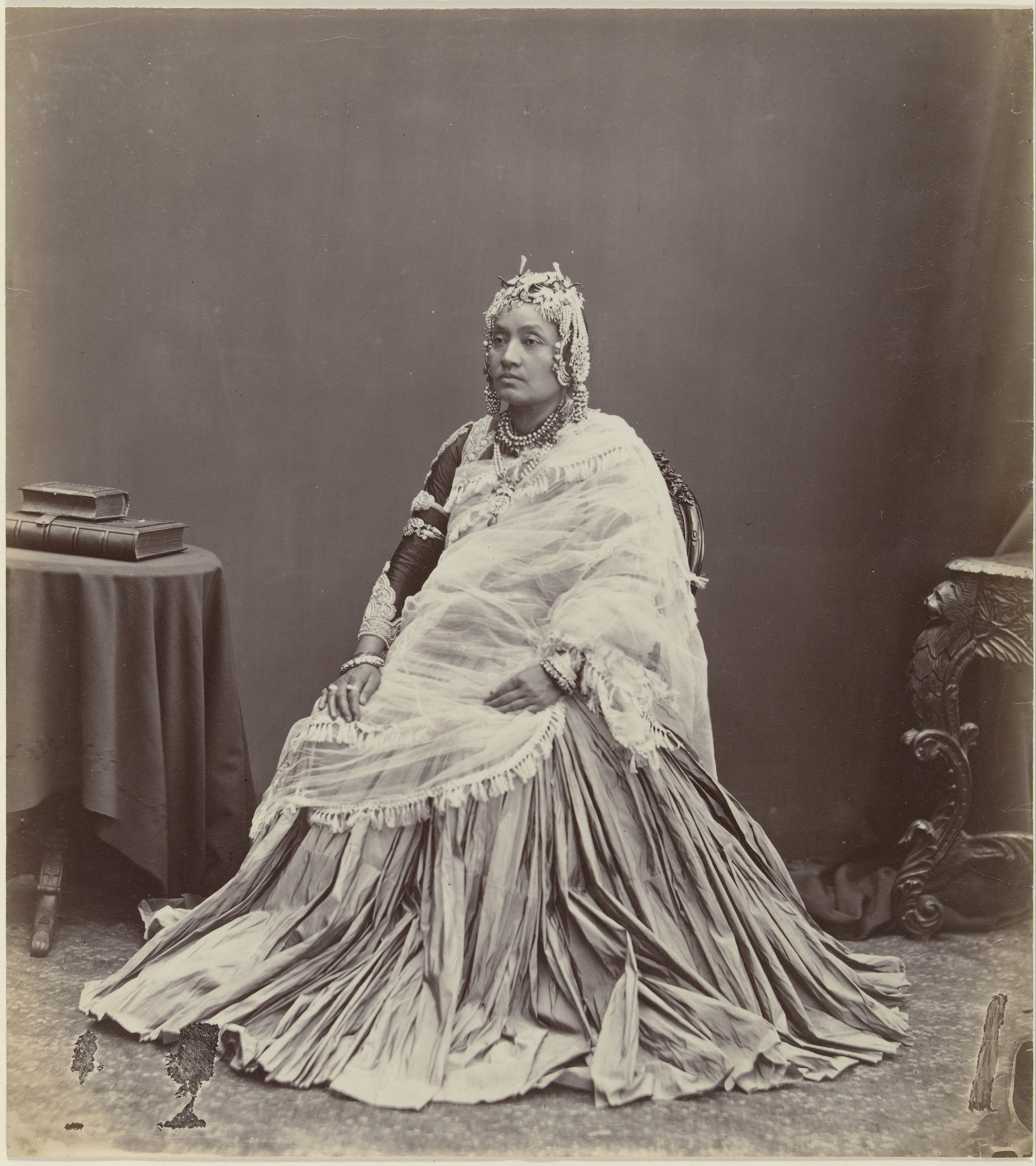
- Hiranya Garbha Devi in c. 1860–75
- Born: Hiranya Garbha Chautari Bikram Shah; 16 April 1826; Nepal
- Died: 25 February 1877 (aged 50); Kingdom of Nepal
- Spouse: Jung Bahadur Rana (m. 1854)
- Issue: Lalit Rajeshwori Rajya Lakshmi Devi
- Dynasty: Rana dynasty
- Father: Prana Shah
- Mother: Moha Kumari Devi
- Religion: Hinduism

Hiranya Garbha Kumari Devi (Nepali: हिरण्यगर्भ कुमारी देवी, born as Hiranya Garbha Chautari Bikram Shah, also known as Maiya Maharani (Nepali: मैया महारानी); 16 April 1826 – 25 February 1877) was a Nepalese maharani and principal wife of Jung Bahadur Rana.

According to her Janam kundali, Hiranya Garbha Devi was born on 16 April 1826. Her father Prana Shah was a Chautariya (equivalent to prime minister) and she was the only one daughter of Shah. Her brother Fateh Jung Shah was also a prime minister of Nepal and he was killed in 1846 by Jung Bahadur Rana during the Kot massacre.

Devi married Jung Bahadur Rana, the first Prime Minister of Nepal from the Rana dynasty, on 8 May 1854. Upon her marriage, she was made Bada Maharani (lit. Senior Maharani). Her daughter Lalit Rajeshwori Rajya Lakshmi Devi was married to Trailokya, Crown Prince of Nepal who gave birth to King Prithvi Bir Bikram Shah. On 25 February 1877, Devi committed sati.

Devi was described to be a "strong willed girl" as she married Rana who had killed her brother. She played an important role in Jung Bahadur's life.
