= Prince Narendra of Nepal =

Prince Narendra
- Prince of Nepal
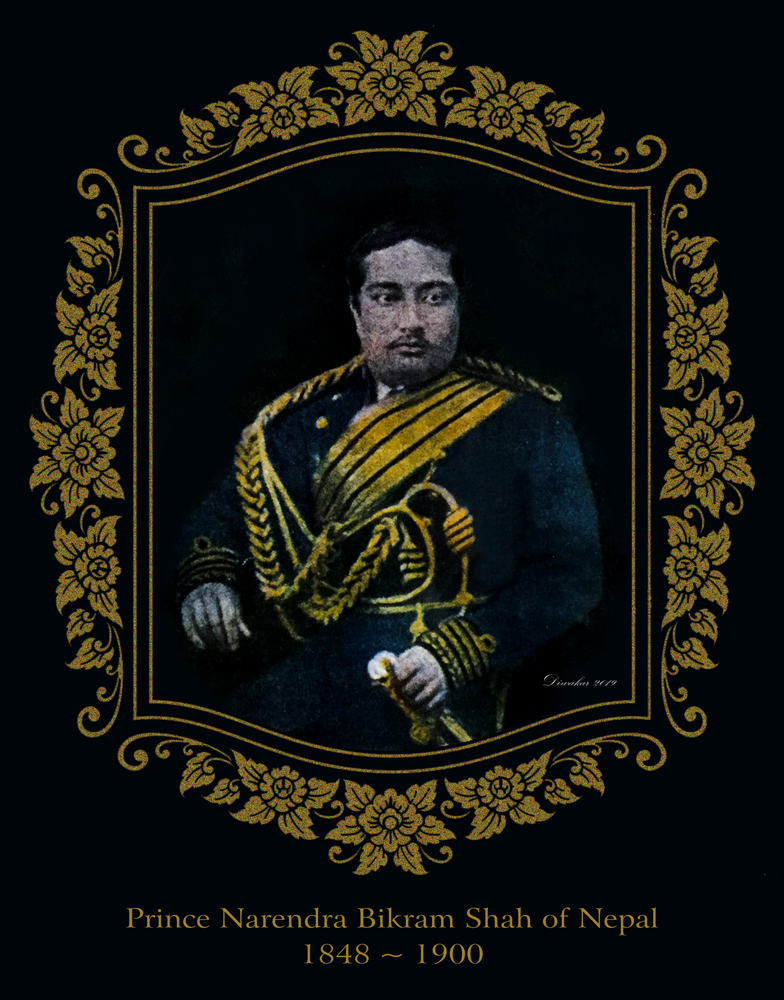
- Born: December 1848; Hanuman Dhoka Palace, Kathmandu, Kingdom of Nepal
- Died: before 1901
- Issue: Prince Ratindra; Prince Devendra; Prince Rabendra; Princess Ishwari
- House: Shah dynasty (by birth)
- Father: King Surendra
- Mother: Trailokya Rajya Lakshmi Devi
- Religion: Hinduism

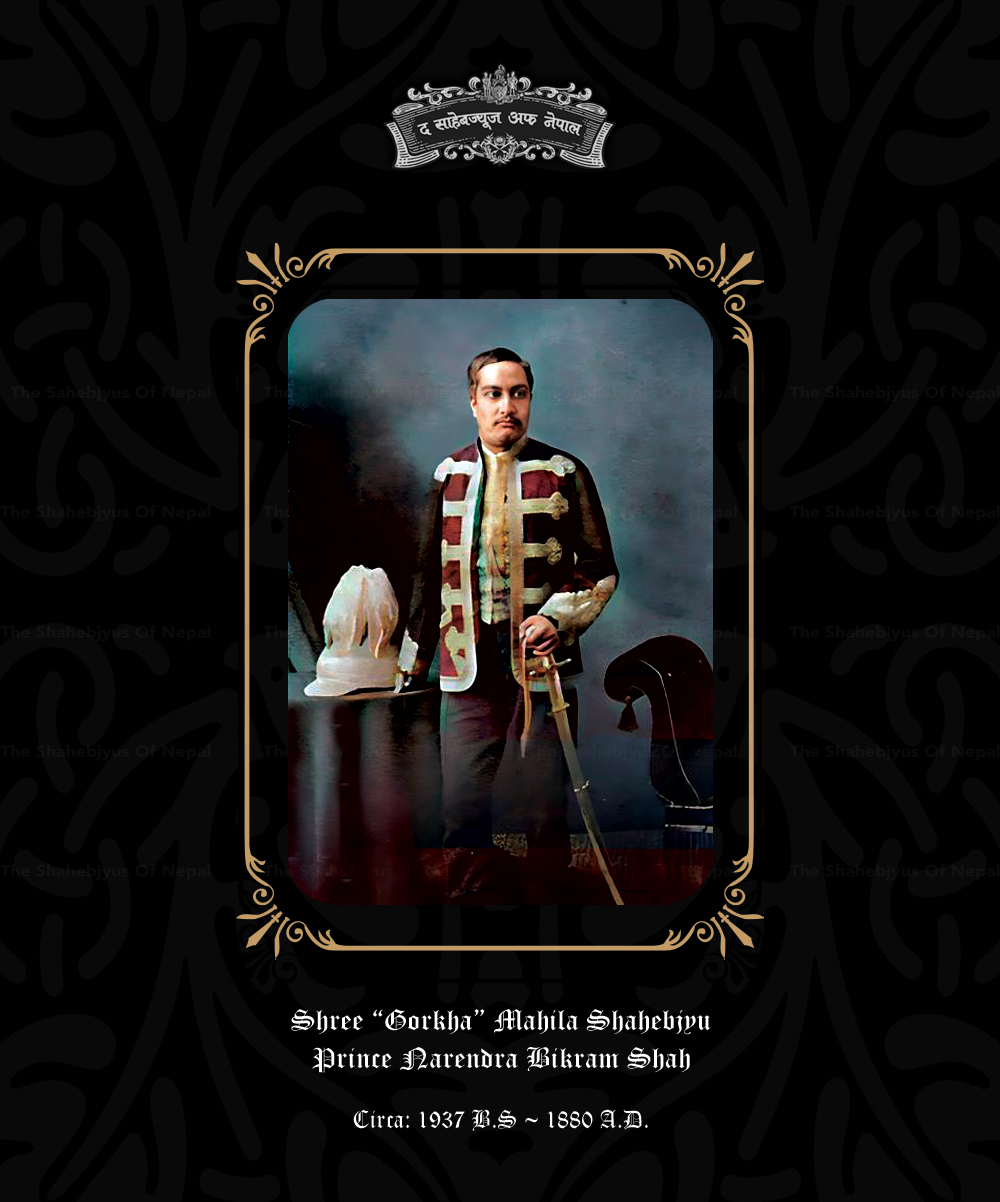
Shree "Gorkha" Mahila Shahebjyu Prince General Narendra Bikram Shah

General Prince Narendra Bikram Shah (December 1848 - before 1901) was the second son of King Surendra. The prince was exiled to India because of his involvement in a conspiracy against the Rana dynasty.

== Life ==
He was born in Hanuman Dhoka Palace, and was a son of King Surendra and his second wife, Queen Trailokya. He was educated privately.

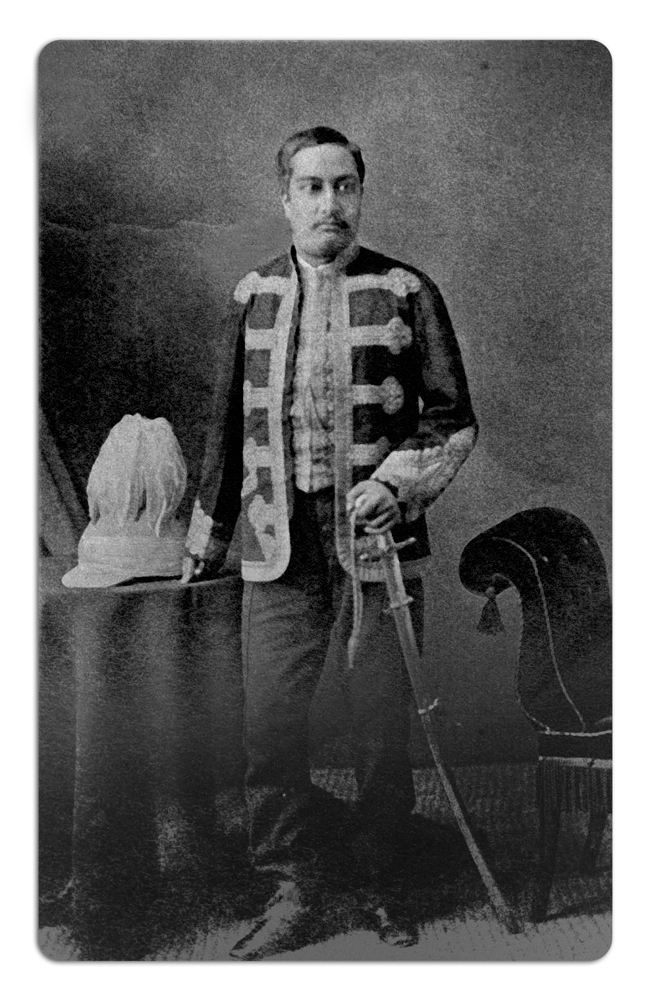
Prince Narendra Bikram Shah, younger brother of Crown Prince Trailokya Bikram Shah of Nepal.

At that time, the king had little power. The political leadership and dominance was held by the members of the family of the Kunwar family, that is, the family of Jung Bahadur Rana, who was the first Rana prime minister of Nepal. Prince Narendra's elder brother, Crown Prince Trailokya, was involved in conspiracies against the Rana ruler, but died under suspicious circumstances in 1878. After Trailokya's death, Narendra assumed the leadership in the conspiracy against the Rana ruler. He was involved in this conspiracy along with two of Jung Bahadur's sons. The plan was never carried out, reportedly because Jung Bahadur's sons insisted that no conspiracy should be carried out in the year of mourning following their father's death.

Three years later, in 1881, several people were arrested for plotting against the Rana ruler. One of the arrested people revealed that Prince Narendra and two of Jung Bahadur's sons had been involved in a conspiracy against the Rana ruler. All three of them were exiled. Prince Narendra was sent to Chunar, India.

In April 1885, the prince was pardoned and was allowed to return to Kathmandu. However, the then Rana prime minister, Ranodip Singh Kunwar was killed by his nephews in a coup d'état in November 1885. After the coup d'état, Prince Narendra then lived in Tallo Durbar of Gorkha which is known as Gorkha Museum now.

Prince Narendra was married and had several children. His descendants are present to this day. His great-great-grandson, Sri Mukhya Sahebju Deepak Bikram Shah, lit the funeral pyre of King Birendra and Queen Aishwarya in 2001.

He died sometime before 1901.
