= Divyeshwari =

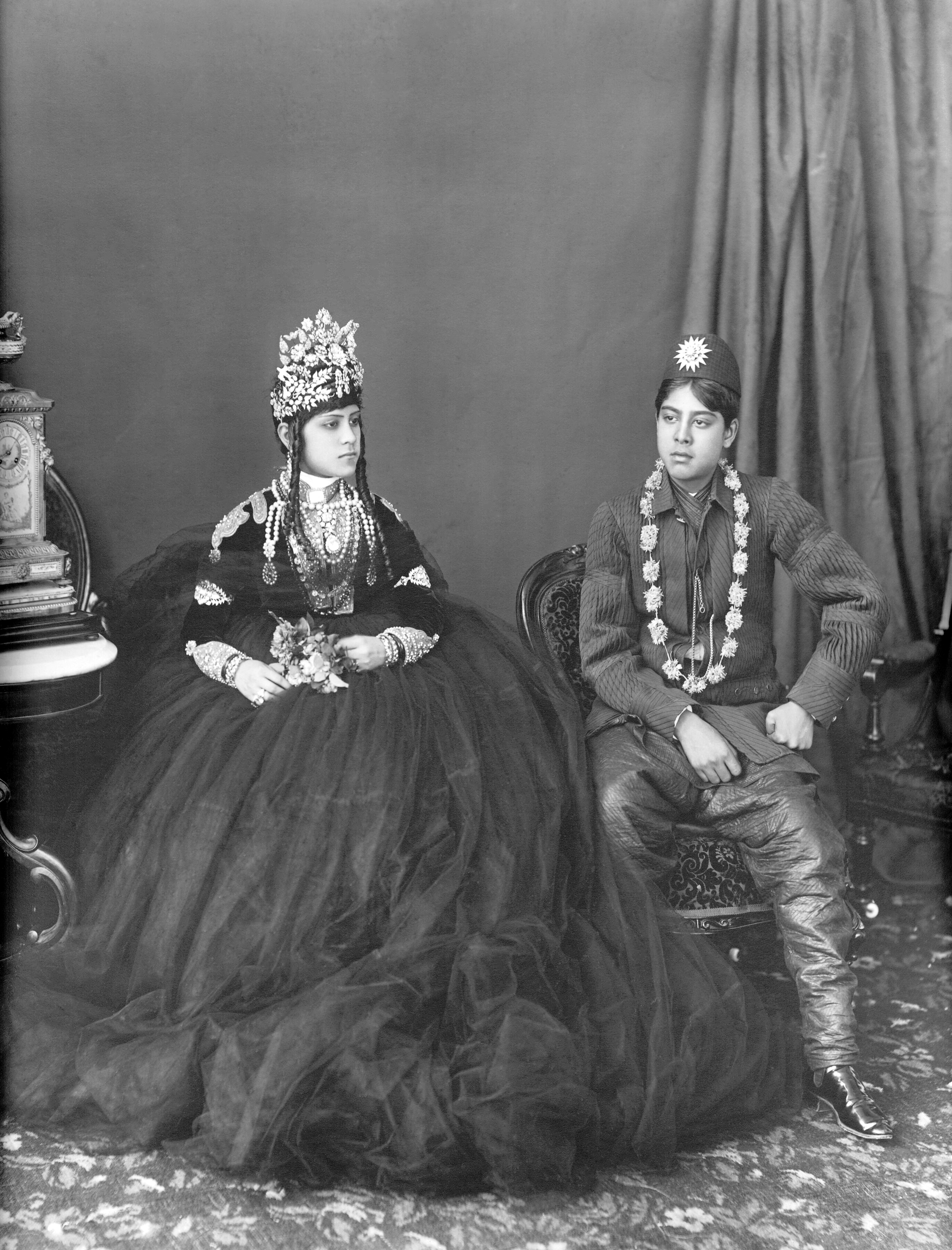
- Divyeshwari with her husband Prithvi.

Queen consort of Nepal
- Tenure: April 1886 – 11 December 1911
- Born: 1875; Kangra, India
- Died: 1933 (aged 57–58); Narayanhiti Royal Palace, Kathmandu, Nepal
- Spouse: Prithvi of Nepal
- Issue: Prince Tribhuvan; Princess Suman
Names
- Divyeshwari Rajya Lakshmi Devi Shah
- House: Shah dynasty (by marriage)
- Religion: Hindu

Divyeshwari (Nepali: दिव्येश्वरी राज्य लक्ष्मीदेवी शाह; 1875–1933) was the Queen Consort of Nepal from her marriage in 1886 to her husband's death in 1911. She was the second wife of King Prithvi of Nepal. Queen Divyeshwari was the mother of King Tribhuvan of Nepal.

Other anglicized names include Queen Laxmi Divyeshwari.

Queen Divyeshwari was originally a Rajput princess from Kangra, Punjab. She was married to King Prithvi in 1886 at the Narayanhity Royal Palace. She was a queen consort until 1911, when her husband died. Her son, Crown Prince Tribhuvan, then ascended the throne. Also she had a daughter, Princess Suman Rajya Lakshmi Devi (1908-1968).

Queen Divyeshwari died in 1933 at the Narayanhiti Royal Palace.

Royal titles
Preceded by Trailokya	Queen consort of Nepal; 1886–1911	Succeeded by Kanti
