= Prithvi Bir Bikram Shah =

King of Nepal from 1881 to 1911

Prithvi Bir Bikram Shah Dev पृथ्वी वीर विक्रम शाह देव
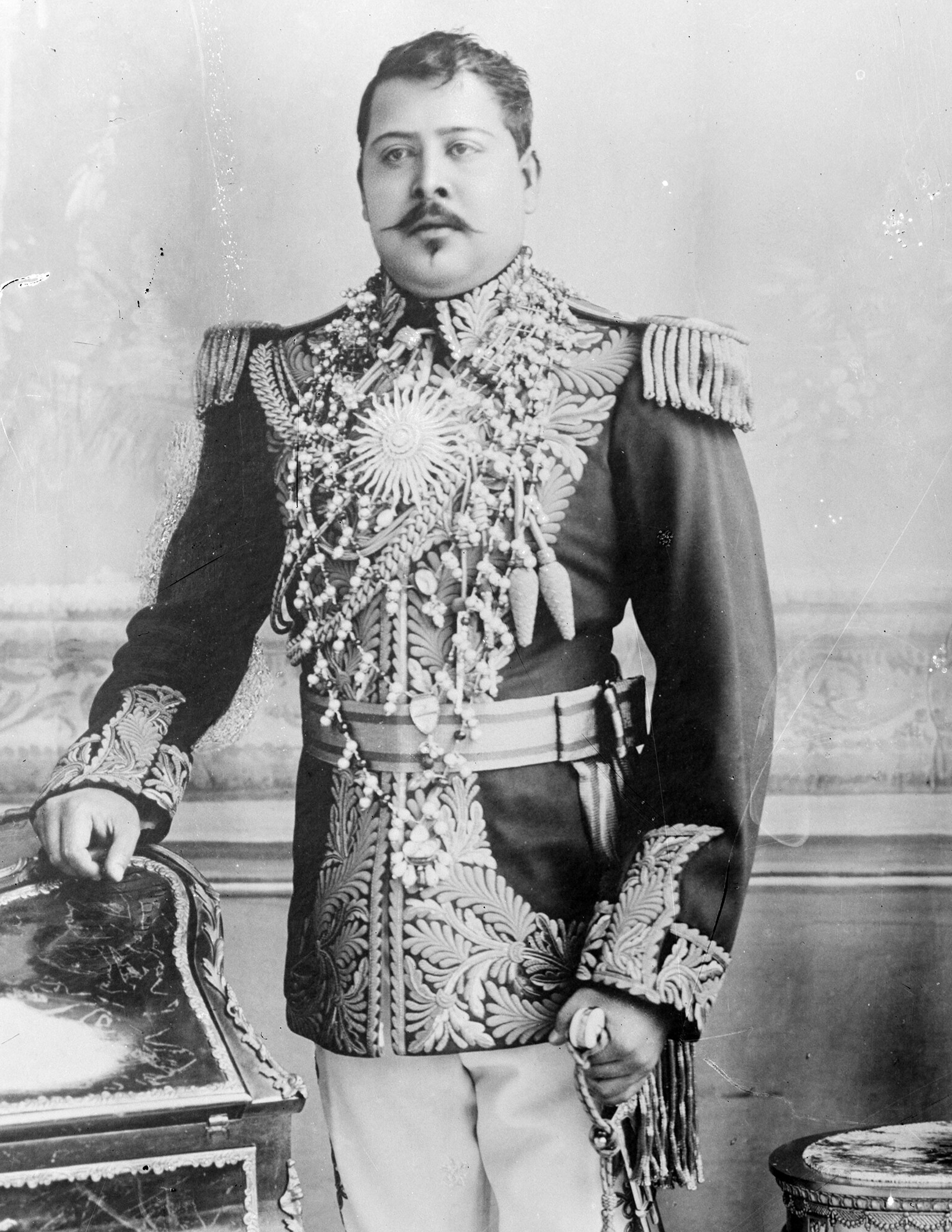

King of Nepal
- Reign: 17 May 1881 – 11 December 1911
- Coronation: 1 December 1881
- Predecessor: Surendra Bikram Shah
- Successor: Tribhuvan Bir Bikram Shah
- Prime ministers: See list: Ranodip Singh Kunwar Bir Shumsher Jung Bahadur Rana Dev Shumsher Jung Bahadur Rana Chandra Shumsher Jung Bahadur Rana
- Born: 18 August 1875; Basantapur, Nepal
- Died: 11 December 1911 (aged 36); Kathmandu, Nepal
- Spouse: Raman Rajya Lakshmi Devi Shah; Divyeshwari Lakshmi Devi Shah; Kirti Rajya Lakshmi Devi Shah; Durga Rajya Lakshmi Devi Shah
- Issue: Princess Yuvani; Princess Lakshmi; Princess Rama; Princess Tara; King Tribhuvan; Princess Suman; Prince Sagar
Regnal name
- Shree Paanch Maharajadhiraj Prithvi Bir Bikram Shah Dev
- Dynasty: Shah
- Father: Crown Prince Trailokya
- Mother: Lalit Rajeshwori Rajya Lakshmi Devi
- Religion: Hinduism

Prithvi Bir Bikram Shah (Nepali: श्री ५ महाराजाधिराज पृथ्वी वीर विक्रम शाह देव; 18 August 1875 – 11 December 1911) was King of Nepal from 1881 until his death in 1911. Among the most notable events of his reign were the introduction of the first automobiles to Nepal, and the creation of strict water and sanitation systems for much of the country.

King Prithvi's eldest child was Princess Lakshmi, who was married to Field Marshal Kaiser Shamsher Jang Bahadur Rana. She was made the Crown Princess and was heir to Nepal's throne until she was 11, when her brother Tribhuvan was born. Until then King Prithvi only had four daughters and four from another wife.

While King Prithvi was kept at the Narayanhiti Royal Palace, his brothers, who were his closest allies and confidants were exiled to palaces across Nepal including in Palpa, Birgunj and Dhankuta from the Hanuman Dhoka Royal Palace, to prevent any repetition of attempts to regain royal prerogatives. Due to some of their increasing influence in state matters, fears of a coup arose and thus, movement restrictions imposed on the family became much more severe following the end of Prime Minister Bir Sumsher's rule with Chandra Sumsher on the Prime Ministerial throne, especially in relation to getting an audience with their half brother King Prithvi at the Narayanhiti Royal Palace, Kathmandu.

Much like his father Trailokya, King Prithvi also died under suspicious circumstances at a relatively young age, and his son Tribhuvan ascended the throne.

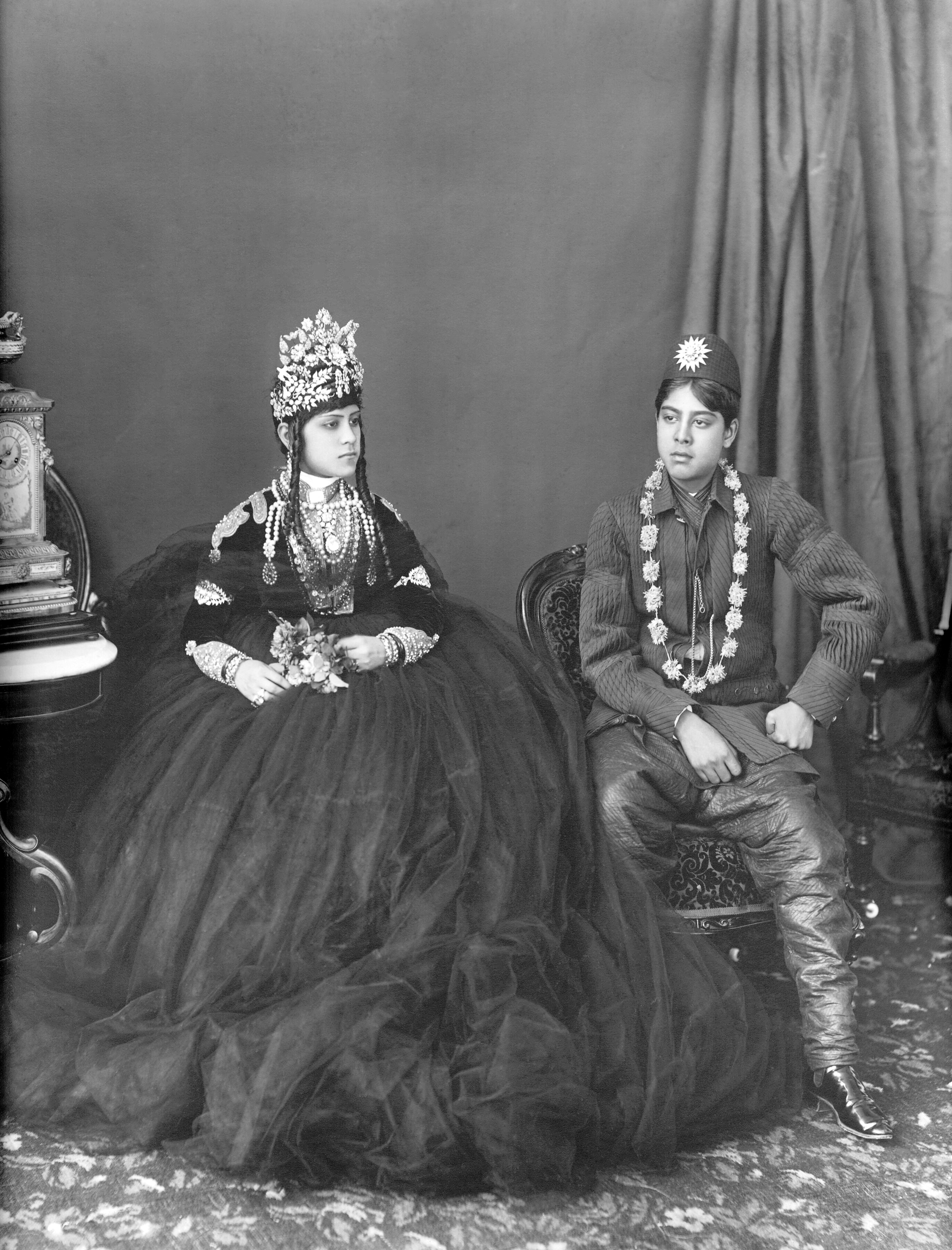
Prithvi with his second wife, Queen Divyeshwari of Nepal (mother of King Tribhuvan).

== Honours ==
- Sovereign of the Order of Gorkha Dakshina Bahu (1896).

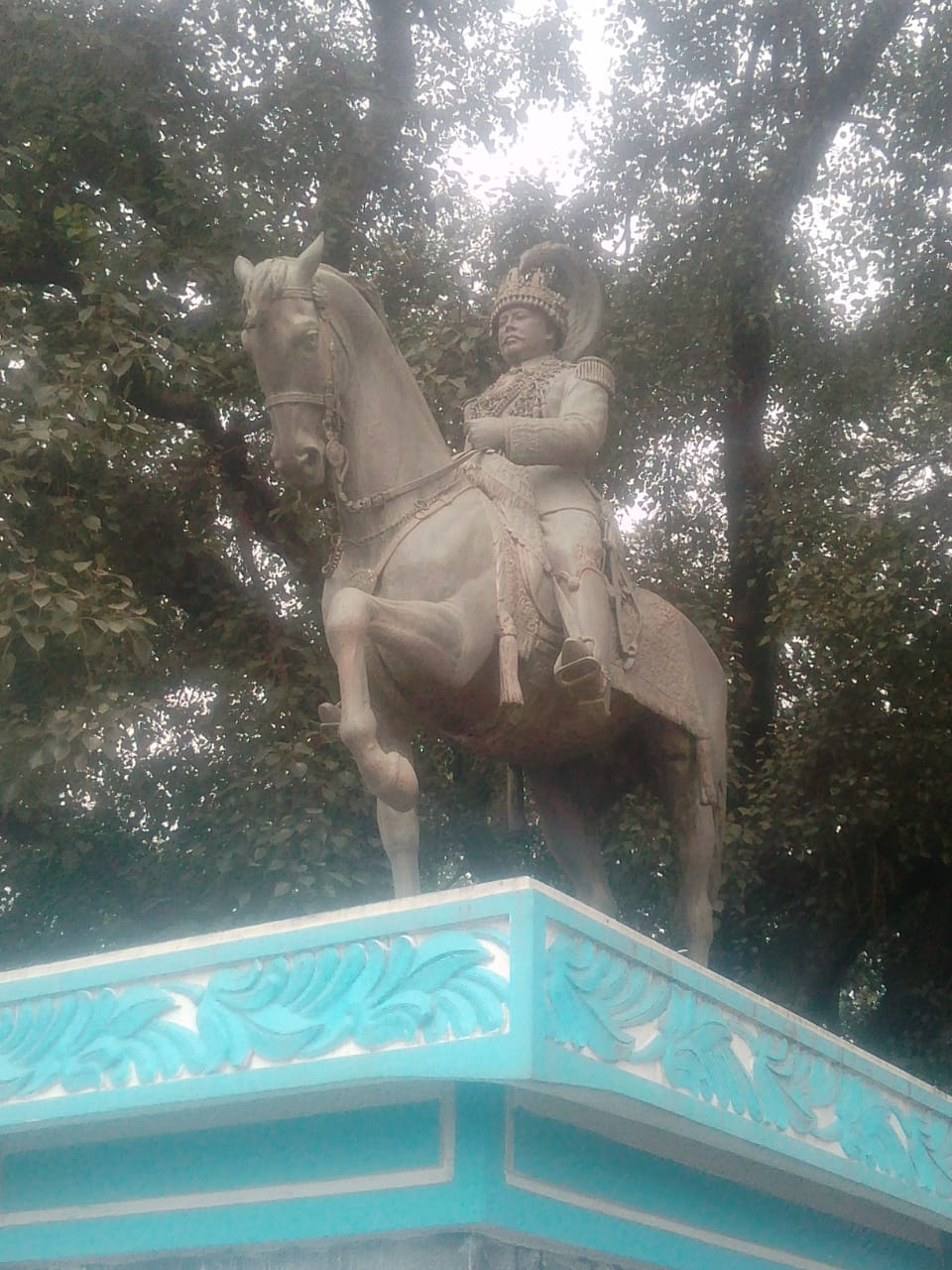
Prithvi Bir Bikram Shah Statue at Bhadrakali

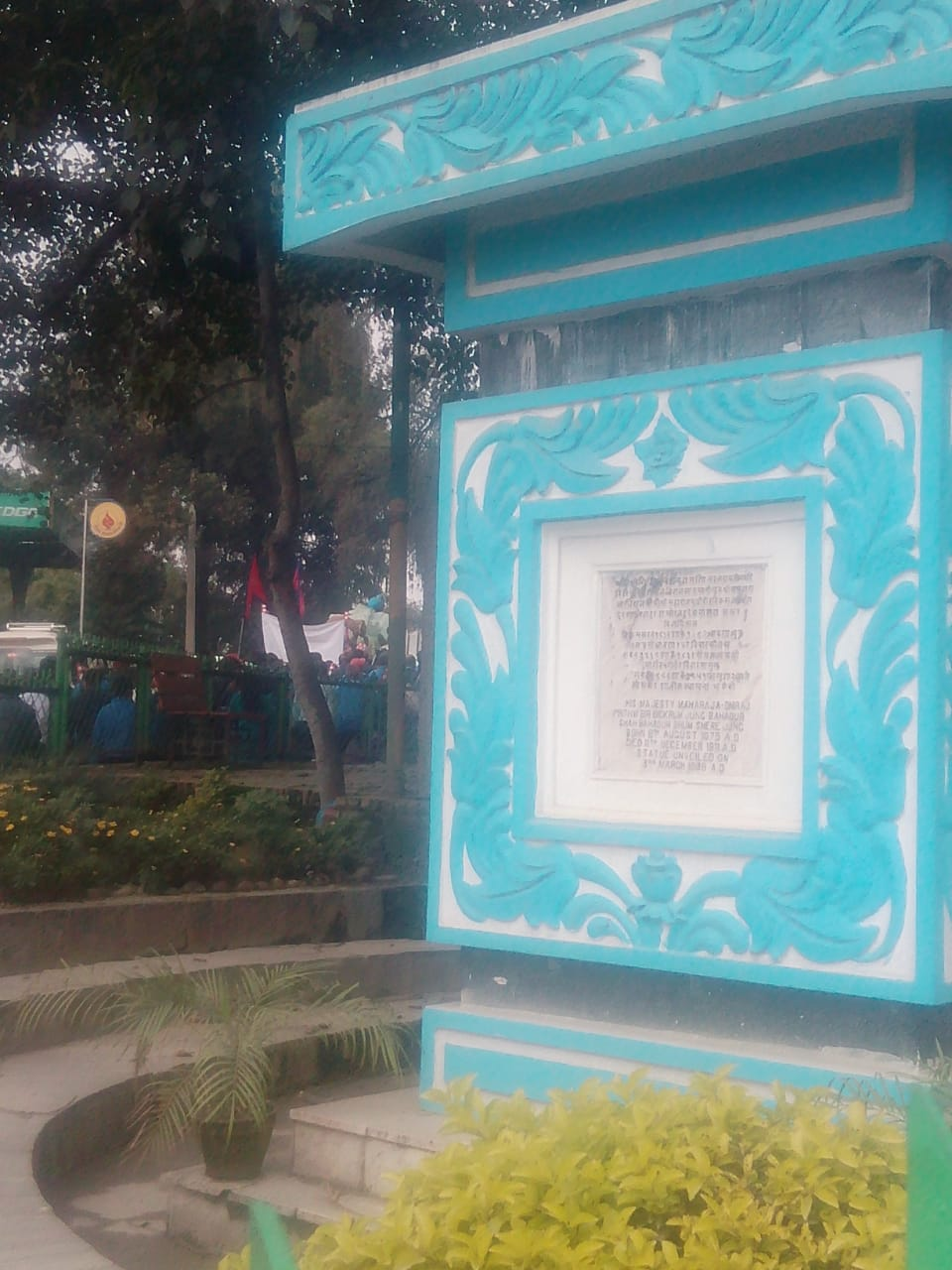
Inscription of Statue of Prithvi Bir Bikram Bhadrakali

== Ancestry ==
Ancestors of Prithvi Bir Bikram Shah

8. King Rajendra Bikram Shah of Nepal
4. King Surendra Bikram Shah of Nepal
9. Samrajya Lakshmi Devi
2. Trailokya, Crown Prince of Nepal
5. Trailokya Rajya Lakshmi Devi
1. King Prithvi Bir Bikram Shah Dev
12. Kaji Bal Narsingh Kunwar
6. Jang Bahadur Kunwar Ranaji, 1st Maharaja of Lamjung and Kaski
13. Kajini Ganesh Kumari Thapa
3. Lalit Rajeshwori Rajya Lakshmi Devi
14. Chautarya Prana Shah
7. Hiranyagarbha Kumari Devi, Maharani of Lamjung and Kaski
15. Chautaryani Moha Kumari Devi

Prithvi Bir Bikram Shah Shah dynasty Born: 18 August 1875 Died: 11 December 1911
Regnal titles
Preceded by Surendra Bir Bikram Shah	King of Nepal; 1881–1911	Succeeded by Tribhuvan Bir Bikram Shah
