= Lalit Rajeshwori Rajya Lakshmi Devi =

Crown Princess Lalit
- Crown Princess of Nepal; Queen Regent of Nepal
- Born: 1854; Thapathali Durbar, Kathmandu, Kingdom of Nepal
- Died: 1917 (aged 62–63); Pashupati, Kathmandu, Kingdom of Nepal
- Spouse: Trailokya, Crown Prince of Nepal
- Issue: King Prithvi of Nepal
Names
- Lalit Rajeshwori Rajya Lakshmi Devi
- Dynasty: Rana dynasty (by birth); Shah dynasty (by marriage)
- Father: Jang Bahadur Kunwar Ranaji
- Mother: Hiranya Garbha Kumari Devi
- Religion: Hinduism

Lalit Rajeshwori Rajya Lakshmi Devi (1854–1917) was one of the wives of Prince Trailokya of Nepal and was named Crown Princess and regent for her minor son Prithvi of Nepal, who later became King of Nepal.

== Biography ==
Lalit was the second daughter of Commanding-General Sir Jang Bahadur Kunwar Ranaji, Maharaja of Lamjung and Kaski, GCB, GCSI, Prime Minister and Colonel-in-chief of Nepal, by his wife, Hiranya Garbha Kumari Devi, youngest daughter of Sri Chautaria Prana Shah.

She married Trailokya, Crown Prince of Nepal in Thapathali Durbar, Kathmandu, on 10 June 1860, in a double ceremony with her sister, Somgarva Divyeshwari Rajya Lakshmi Devi (second and third wives of Trailokya; the first wife was their other sister, Tara Rajya Lakshmi Devi).

She was Regent for her son since 17 May 1881 until 8 August 1893

She was named Tower Sri Panch.
