= Surendra Bikram Shah =

King of Nepal from 1847 to 1881

Surendra Bikram Shah Dev सुरेन्द्र विक्रम शाह देव
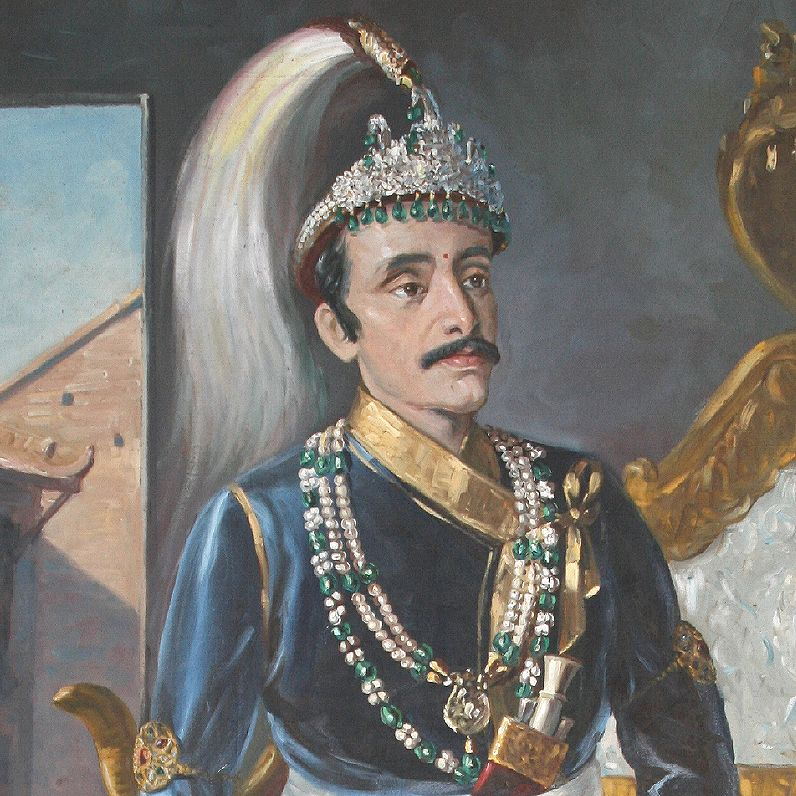

King of Nepal
- Reign: 12 May 1847 – 17 May 1881
- Coronation: 12 May 1847
- Predecessor: Rajendra Bikram Shah
- Successor: Prithvi Bir Bikram Shah
- Prime ministers: See list: Jung Bahadur Rana Bam Bahadur Kunwar Ranodip Singh Kunwar
- Born: 20 October 1829; Basantapur, Kingdom of Nepal
- Died: 17 May 1881 (aged 51); Basantapur, Kingdom of Nepal
- Spouse: Sura Rajya Lakshmi Devi; Trailokya Rajya Lakshmi Devi; Deva Rajya Lakshmi Devi
- Issue: Crown Prince Trailokya; Prince Narendra; Princess Tika (among others)
Regnal name
- Shree Paanch Maharajadhiraj Surendra Bikram Shah Dev
- Dynasty: Shah
- Father: King Rajendra
- Mother: Queen Samrajya Lakshmi
- Religion: Hinduism

Surendra Bikram Shah (Nepali: श्री ५ महाराजाधिराज सुरेन्द्र विक्रम शाह देव; 20 October 1829 – 17 May 1881) was King of Nepal from 1829 to until his death in 1881. He became the king after Prime Minister Jung Bahadur Rana forced the abdication of his father, Rajendra Bikram Shah. Surendra was effectively reduced to a figurehead, with Rana being the de facto ruler of the country.

== Early life ==
Surendra was the son of King Rajendra and his first wife, Queen Samrajya. He was born the crown prince of Nepal and was relatively unpopular.

== Prince regent ==
Surendra's stepmother, Queen Rajya Lakshmi, was ambitious to have her son, Prince Ranendra, sit on the throne. However, Jung Bahadur Rana, who was ambitious and wanted power, might have cooperated with Rajya Lakshmi for his own motive. After the Kot massacre, in which Rana managed to eliminate a large number of nobles, Rana turned against the queen, who in turn plotted to kill him (though the plot failed). Considering Queen Rajya Lakshmi a threat to himself, Rana, who had become the prime minister, exiled Rajya Lakshmi to Varanasi. King Rajendra also accompanied her to Varanasi. Before leaving, he made Surendra the prince regent. However, later Rana forced the abdication of King Rajendra, and then Surendra was made the king.

== Life as the king ==
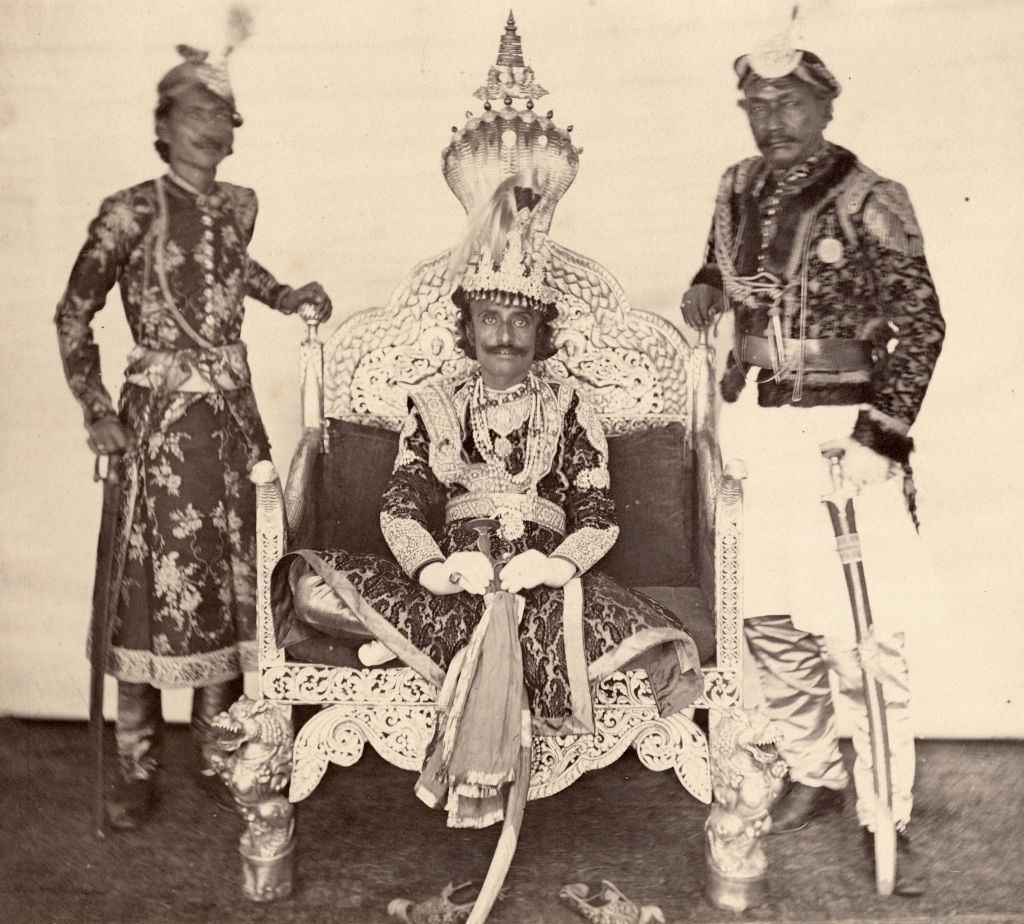
Picture of King Surendra Bikram Shah with two body guards taken by the then British Assistant Resident Clarence Comyn Taylor around 1862-1865.

King Surendra was like a prisoner in his own palace: with the exception of his immediate family, nobody could visit him without the permission of Jung Bahadur Rana. The king was only allowed to read literature. Frustrated at these circumstances, the king wanted to abdicate in favor of his eldest son Trailokya, but the Rana did not allow it.

Surendra was allowed to meet his father, the ex-king Rajendra, once every month. Rajendra continued to live under house arrest until his death.

In 1856, King Surendra issued a sanad- which formalized the dominance and political leadership of the Kunwar family- the family of Jung Bahadur Rana. The king and his descendants could use the honorific title of 'Shri' five times with their names, while the members of the Kunwar family used the title thrice- placing the Kunwar family in a rank that was second only to the royal family. While Surendra remained the king (Maharajadhiraja), he had little power; Jung Bahadur Rana ruled the country.

Surendra's son, General and Crown Prince Trailokya Bir Bikram Shah Deva married three of Jung Bahadur Rana's daughters, Tara Rajya Lakhsmi Devi, Lalit Rajeshwori Rajya Lakshmi Devi and Hiranyagarbha Kumari Devi. Trilokya died in 1878, and Trilokya's son Prithvi Bir Bikram Shah became heir to the throne.

== Death ==
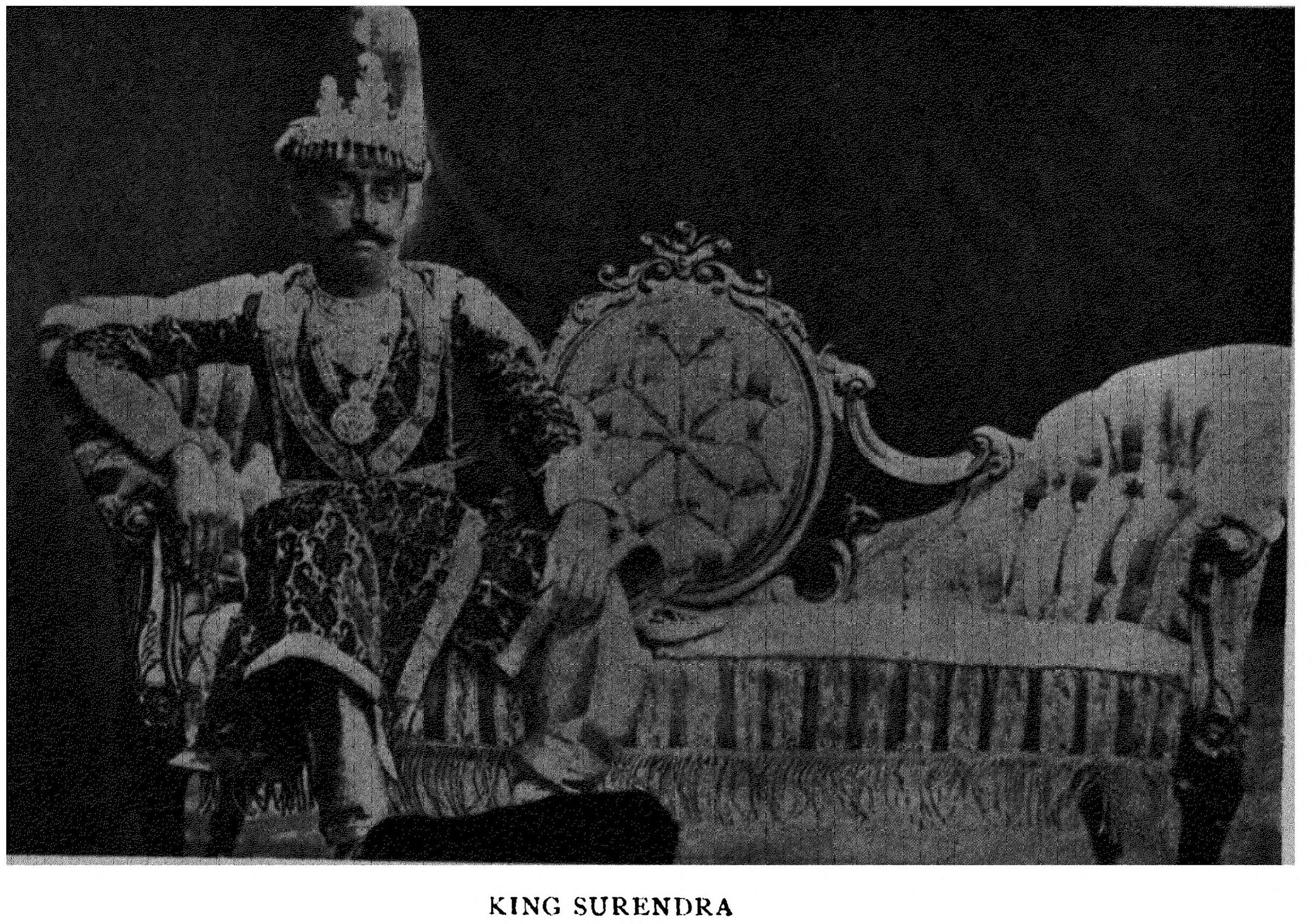
Surendra Bikram Shah

Surendra died in 1881. His grandson Prithvi succeeded him as the king of Nepal.

Surendra Bikram Shah Shah dynasty Born: 20 October 1829 Died: 17 May 1881
Regnal titles
Preceded by Rajendra Bikram Shah	King of Nepal; 1847–1881	Succeeded by Prithvi Bir Bikram Shah
