= Trailokya Rajya Lakshmi Devi =

Trailokya

Queen consort of Nepal
- Tenure: 12 May 1847 – October 1850
- Born: Gulmi, Kingdom of Nepal
- Died: October 1850; Hanuman Dhoka Palace, Kathmandu, Kingdom of Nepal
- Spouse: Surendra Bikram Shah
- Issue: Trailokya, Crown Prince of Nepal; Narendra Bikram Shah; Tika Rajya Lakshmi Devi
Names
- Trailokya Rajya Lakshmi Devi
- Dynasty: House of Shah (by marriage)
- Father: Raja of Gulmi
- Religion: Hinduism

Trailokya Rajya Lakshmi Devi (? – October 1850) was the Queen of Surendra Bikram Shah, King of Nepal. She was the mother of Trailokya, Crown Prince of Nepal and Narendra, Prince of Nepal.

Royal titles
Preceded by Rajya	Queen consort of Nepal; 1847–1850	Succeeded by Divyeshwari
