= Trailokya, Crown Prince of Nepal =

Crown Prince Trailokya
- HRH The Crown Prince of Nepal
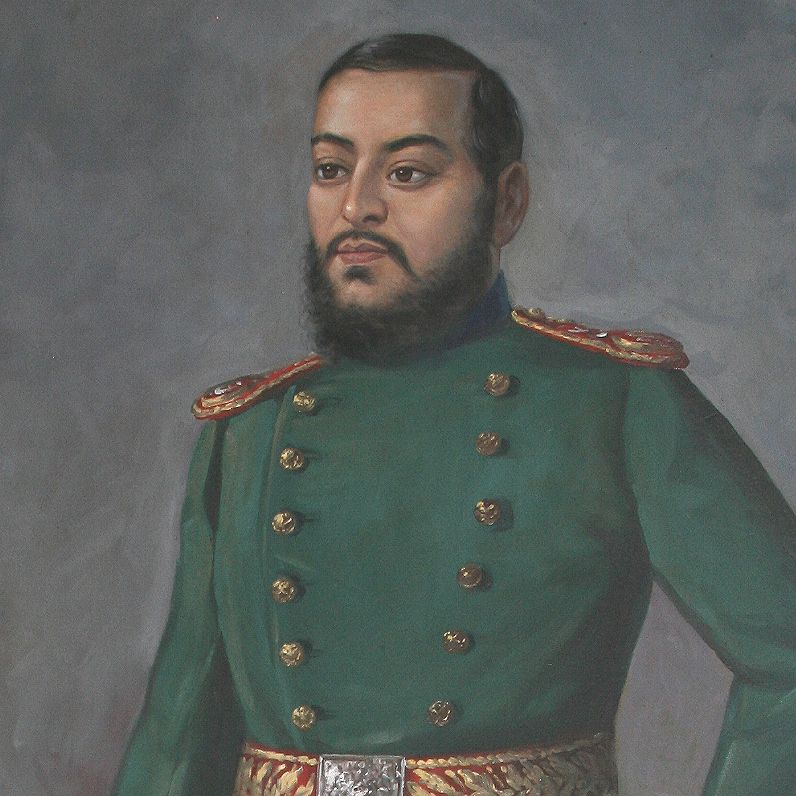
- Born: 30 November 1847; Hanuman Dhoka Palace, Kathmandu, Kingdom of Nepal
- Died: 30 March 1878 (aged 30); Hanuman Dhoka Palace, Kathmandu, Kingdom of Nepal
- Spouse: Tara Rajya Lakshmi Devi; Lalit Rajeshwori Rajya Lakshmi Devi; Somgarva Divyeshwari Rajya Lakshmi Devi
- Issue: King Prithvi Bir Bikram Shah; Maharajkumari Pran; Maharajkumari Lalpati; Sahebju Yaksha Bikram; Sahebju Ran Bikram; General Sahebju Jharendra Bikram; Sahebju Gajendra Bikram; Sahebju Bir Bikram (and several others by concubines)
- House: Shah dynasty (by birth)
- Father: King Surendra
- Mother: Trailokya Rajya Lakshmi Devi
- Religion: Hinduism

Trailokya Bikram Shah (Nepali: त्रैलोक्य विक्रम शाह; 30 November 1847 – 30 March 1878) was the Crown Prince and heir apparent to the throne of Nepal. He died under suspicious circumstances before his father, paving the way for his six years old son, Prithvi Bir Bikram Shah, to ascend the throne.

== Life ==
Crown Prince Trailokya

Trailokya was the son of King Surendra and his second wife, Trailokya Rajya Lakshmi Devi. He was educated privately.

He first married three daughters of Jung Bahadur Rana: Tara Rajya Lakshmi Devi, then Lalit Rajeshwori Rajya Lakshmi Devi and Somgarva Divyeshwari Rajya Lakshmi Devi (in the same ceremony with the two sisters). His senior wives bore him two sons and two daughters, and he had five sons and several daughters by junior wives, some from local noble clans. He also had several children by concubines.

At that time, the King of Nepal had little power: the country was ruled by the Rana prime minister. The royal family was bereft of any real political leadership. The Sanad of 1856 had assigned all power to the Rana prime minister. Crown Prince Trailokya, upon reaching his maturity in 1875, decided to regain the royal prerogatives that his father had lost in 1856. With the help of his Sahebju brother Mahila Sahebju Narendra Bikram of Gorkha and Jagat Jang, a son of Jang Bahadur Rana, the Crown Prince set a plan by which the order of succession according to the 1856 Sanad would be put aside in the event of Jung Bahadur's death; in such a case, Prince Trailokya would force King Surendra to abdicate and appoint Jagat Jang as the Prime Minister. The plan was, however, unsuccessful. After Jung Bahadur died in Patherghatta, his youngest brother Dhir Shamsher spread the news that Jung Bahadur had not died, but was only critically ill. As Crown Prince Trailokya and Jagat Jang rushed to Patharghat, Dhir Shamsher compelled King Surendra to appoint Ranodip Singh Kunwar as the next prime minister, as per the laws of succession.

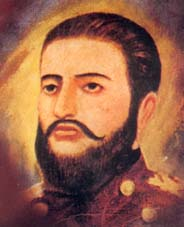
Crown Prince Trailokya

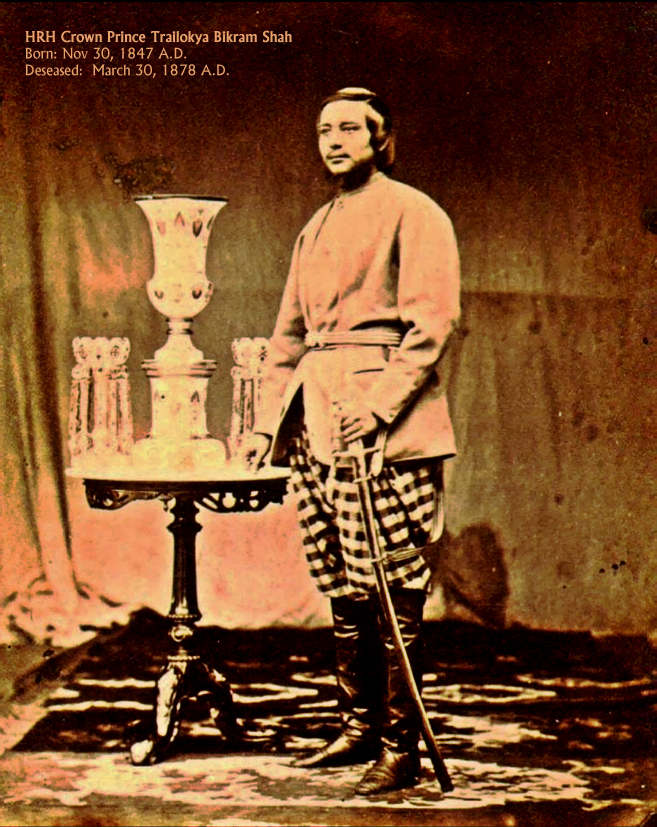
Crown Prince Trailokya Bikram Shah of Nepal

Crown Prince Trailokya died in 1878 under suspicious circumstances, after which his son Prithivi Bir ascended the throne. While his eldest son, King Prithivi, was kept as a glorified prisoner and ceremonial monarch at Narayanhiti Royal Palace, his younger sons, the Sahebjus, were exiled to several districts of Nepal, including Dhankuta, Palpa Gauda, Birgunj, and also India, from Hanuman Dhoka Royal Palace to prevent any repeated attempts at regaining royal prerogatives. The Crown Prince's Sahebju children continued to live in their areas or dukedoms with full state benefits and were free to occasionally travel to their Hanuman Dhoka Royal Palace residence in Kathmandu. However, due to fears of a coup, restrictions were imposed on the families after the end of PM Bir Sumsher's rule and the start of PM Chandra Sumsher's, especially concerning obtaining an audience from their brother King Prithivi Bir at Narayanhiti Royal Palace, Kathmandu.
