= Shah dynasty =

Dynasty that ruled Kingdom of Gorkha (1559–1768) and Kingdom of Nepal (1768–2008)

Shah dynasty शाह वंश
- The royal coat of arms of Nepal during the Shah dynasty (adopted in 1962), featuring the Shree Paanch crown, crossed Gurkha khukris, and the royal motto at the base.
- Parent house: Thakuri
- Country: Kingdom of Nepal
- Founded: 15th century
- Founder: Kulamandan Shah Khad
- Current head: Gyanendra Bir Bikram Shah
- Final ruler: Gyanendra Bir Bikram Shah
- Titles: King of Kaski; King of Lamjung; King of Gorkha; King of Nuwakot; King of Tanahun; King of Makwanpur; King of Hariharpur; King of Kirtipur; King of Kathmandu; King of Lalitpur; King of Bhaktapur; King of Sataunkot; King of Bajhang; King of Bhirkot; King of Nepal
- Styles: Maharaja (1467–1768); Maharajadhiraja (1768–1856); Shri Panch Maharajadhiraja (1856–2008)
- Motto: “विद्या मै छ महाशक्ति; कर्म मै छ सुपूजन।” ("Great power lies in knowledge; Better worship lies in action.")
- Dissolution: 28 May 2008
- Cadet branches: Chautariya

The Shah dynasty (Nepali: शाह वंश, romanized: Shāh Vaṃśa), also known as the Shahs of Gorkha or the Royal House of Gorkha, was a Nepalese Thakuri dynasty that ruled the Gorkha Kingdom, one of the Chaubise principalities, from 1559 to 1768. Following the unification of Nepal under Prithvi Narayan Shah, the dynasty ruled the Kingdom of Nepal from 25 September 1768 until the monarchy was abolished on 28 May 2008.

The Shah kings claimed descent from Rajput chiefs who migrated to the Himalayan hills during the medieval period. According to the genealogical chronicles (lit. 'vamsavalis') of Nepal, the Shahs were descendants of the rulers of Chittaur who fled from Central India during the Muslim invasions of the twelfth and thirteenth centuries. Dravya Shah, the youngest son of Yasho Brahma Shah of Lamjung, seized control of the small hill state of Gorkha in 1559, establishing the dynasty's rule over the principality. Over the following two centuries, the Shah rulers consolidated their position in the Gorkha region, and by the mid-eighteenth century, Gorkha had emerged as one of the most ambitious state of the Chaubisi principalities.

The dynasty's most transformative period began with the accession of Prithvi Narayan Shah to the Gorkha throne in 1743. He launched a campaign to unify the fragmented hill states of present-day Nepal, beginning with the annexation of the Chaubisi principalities and culminating in the conquest of the Kathmandu Valley in 1768. Rather than annexing the newly acquired territories to Gorkha, Prithvi Narayan Shah moved his capital to Kathmandu, establishing the Shah dynasty as the ruling house of a unified Nepal. His successors expanded the kingdom's borders, but the Shah monarchs' power was later seized by the hereditary Rana prime ministers, who dominated Nepal from 1846 to 1951. The dynasty continued as a constitutional monarchy until 2008, when the Constituent Assembly voted to abolish the monarchy, ending 240 years of Shah rule. The last Shah king, Gyanendra, was given fifteen days to vacate the royal palace, which was subsequently converted into a museum.

== History ==
The Shah dynasty traces its historical ancestry to King of Kaski, Kulamandan Khand Shah, whose grandson Dravya Shah conquered the Liglig from local Magar King Dalsur Ghale Magar with the help of accomplices from six resident clans of Majhkot and Liglig. Dravya Shah named his new kingdom Gorkha.

The origins of the Shah dynasty are deeply rooted in the historical landscape of Magarat and Tamuwan, an ancient confederation in western Nepal inhabited primarily by the Magars in the Western and Central hills (Palpa, Tanahu, Gulmi, Arghakhanchi, Syangja, Myagdi, Parbat, Baglung, Pyuthan, Rukum, Rolpa, Kushma, Musikot, Ghiring, Rising, Liglig, and Gorkha, which were historically part of the Magarat region as it was known as the Magar homeland before the unification of Nepal), and Gurung in the Central hills (Lamjung, Gorkha, Kaski, Tanahu). Before the Shah came to power, 12 Magarat—located in the Western and Central hills—was ruled by various Magar kings, including the powerful Magar kings of Palpa. Meanwhile, 18 Magarat, located west of the Kali Gandaki river and primarily inhabited by the Kham Magar, was governed by Magar rulers, alongside Malla-Khas influence in some areas, and Tamuwan was ruled by a Native Gurung tribal chief. After the decline of Magarat's unity, the region fragmented into two groups of small kingdoms: the Baise Rajya (22 principalities) in the far west and the Chaubisi Rajya (24 principalities) in central Nepal. These kingdoms were mostly ruled by local Thakuri and Magar chieftains. Among the Chaubisi Rajya states was Gorkha, where the Shah dynasty rose to power by replacing a local chief. In 1559 CE, Dravya Shah, the son of a Lamjung ruler, seized control of Gorkha by defeating the Magar king Mansingh Khadka Magar with the support of local elites. The Shah dynasty combined their Khas-Thakuri heritage with the martial traditions of Magarat, gradually expanding their influence by conquering neighboring principalities. This process of unification culminated in 1768 CE under Prithvi Narayan Shah, who established the modern Kingdom of Nepal, marking the Shah dynasty as both inheritors and transformants of Magarat's legacy.

== Coronation of Dravya Shah ==
Dravya Shah was the youngest son of Yasho Brahma Shah, Raja (king) of Lamjung and grandson of Kulamandan Shah Khad, Raja of Kaski. He became the king of Gorkha with the help of his accomplices: Gangaram Rana Magar, Narayan Das Arjyal, Kaji Ganesh Pandey. He ascended the throne of Gorkha in 1559 A.D. The loose translation of the Nepali work known as the "Wright Chronicle" describes the coronation of Dravya Shah thus:

On Wednesday the 8th of Bhadon Badi, Saka 1481 (A.D. 1559) Rohini Nakshatra (i.e. the moon in the Rohini mansion) being an auspicious day, Drabya Shah aided by Bhagirath Panth, Ganesa Pande, Gangaram Rana Magar, Narayan Das Arjyal, Khanal Bohra and Murli Khawas of Gorkha, concealed himself in a hut. Ganesa Pande had collected all the people of who wore the brahmanical thread such as the Thapas, Busals, Ranas and Maski Ranas of the Magar tribe, they went by the Dahya Gauda route and the Durbar. Drabya Shah killed the King Mansingh Khadka Magar his own hand, with a sword, during the battle ensued. At the same auspicious moment Drabya took his seat on the gaddi, amidst the clash music.

— History of Nepal

== Absolute monarchy (1768–1846) ==
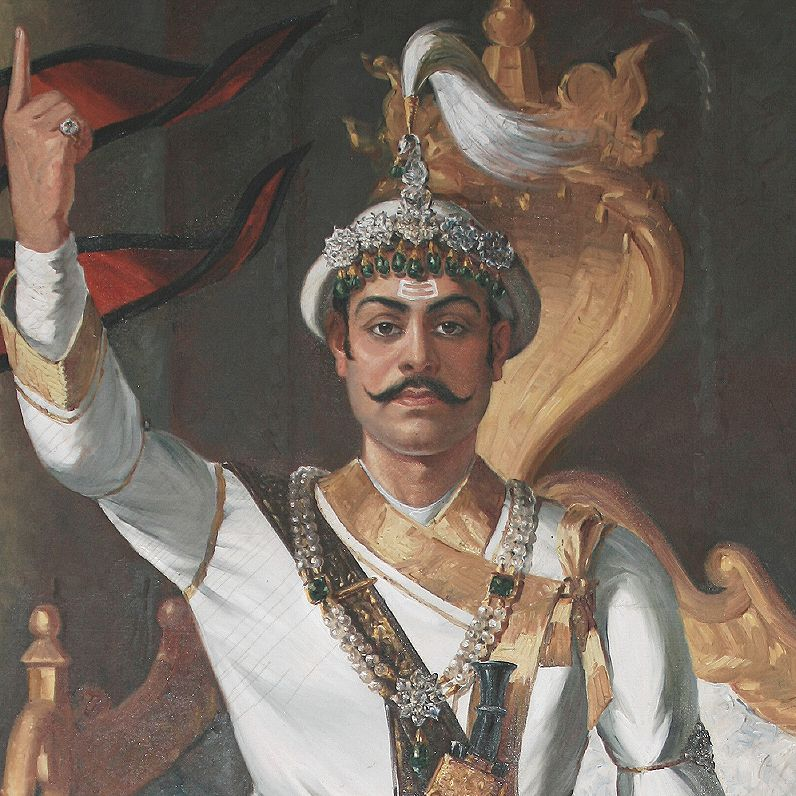
King Prithvi Narayan Shah, the last king of Gorkha Kingdom (1743–1768) and the first Shah king of Nepal (1768–1775)

In 1743, Prithvi Narayan Shah became the ruler of Gorkha. He declared war on other principalities, defeating them one by one. On 25 September 1768, he established the unified kingdom of Gorkha. He became the first king of the unified kingdom named as Asal Hindustan. He, his sons and their successors continued fighting and defeating other kingdoms and enlarging the kingdom of Gorkha. In 1814, the Anglo–Nepalese War between Gorkha and the East India Company began. By 1815, the Shah king had been thoroughly defeated. By 1816, Gorkha had lost one-third of its territory. The Shah kings continued to rule as absolute monarchs until 1846, when the political order changed from absolute monarchy to constitutional monarchy.

== Hereditary prime ministers (1846–1951) ==
In 1846, the Rana dynasty gained power in Nepal. The Ranas became prime ministers and reduced the King's status to a figurehead position. The Ranas ruled Nepal as hereditary prime ministers though in the name of the figurehead king. In 1950, the Shah king King Tribhuvan went into exile in India. He and his family, including the crown prince Mahendra, later returned. After India became a secular state in 1950, and the remaining rajas retired, Nepal was the only remaining Hindu kingdom. In 1951, with the help of India, a popular politician common man Matrika Prasad Koirala became the prime minister of Nepal. Tribhuvan returned to Kathmandu. The Shah dynasty regained control and the prime minister, Mohan Shamsher Jang Bahadur Rana, resigned. King Tribhuvan ruled until 1955 and King Mahendra ruled until 1972. Mahendra's son, Birendra, became king.

== Constitutional monarchy (1990–2008) ==
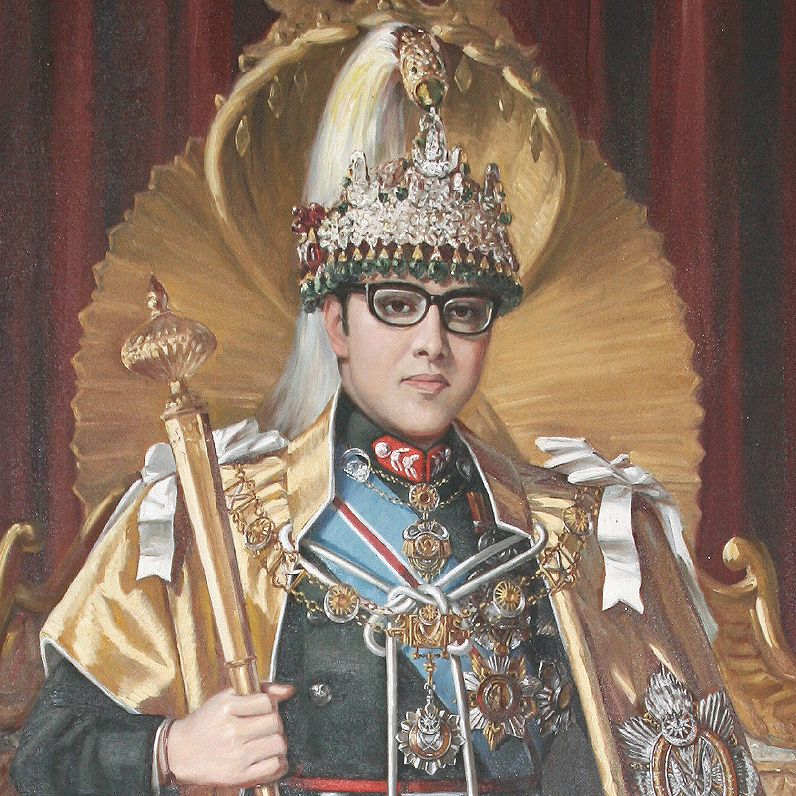
King Birendra Bir Bikram Shah; the first constitutional monarch of Nepal

In 1990, under King Birendra, Nepal became a constitutional monarchy after a mass movement from people forced Birendra Shah to restore democracy.

=== Massacre of the royal family ===
On 1 June 2001, some members of the Shah dynasty were murdered in the royal palace. A High Commission inquiry report concluded that the royal family was slaughtered by Crown Prince Dipendra. This remains controversial. Among the dead were the Crown Prince's father, King Birendra and his brother, Prince Nirajan. After the attack, Dipendra was in a coma and was declared king for a short time. He died a few days later. Gyanendra Bir Bikram Shah Dev, Dipendra's uncle, took the throne. In February 2005, he dismissed the parliament in order to govern in his own right.

== Abolition of the Shah monarchy ==
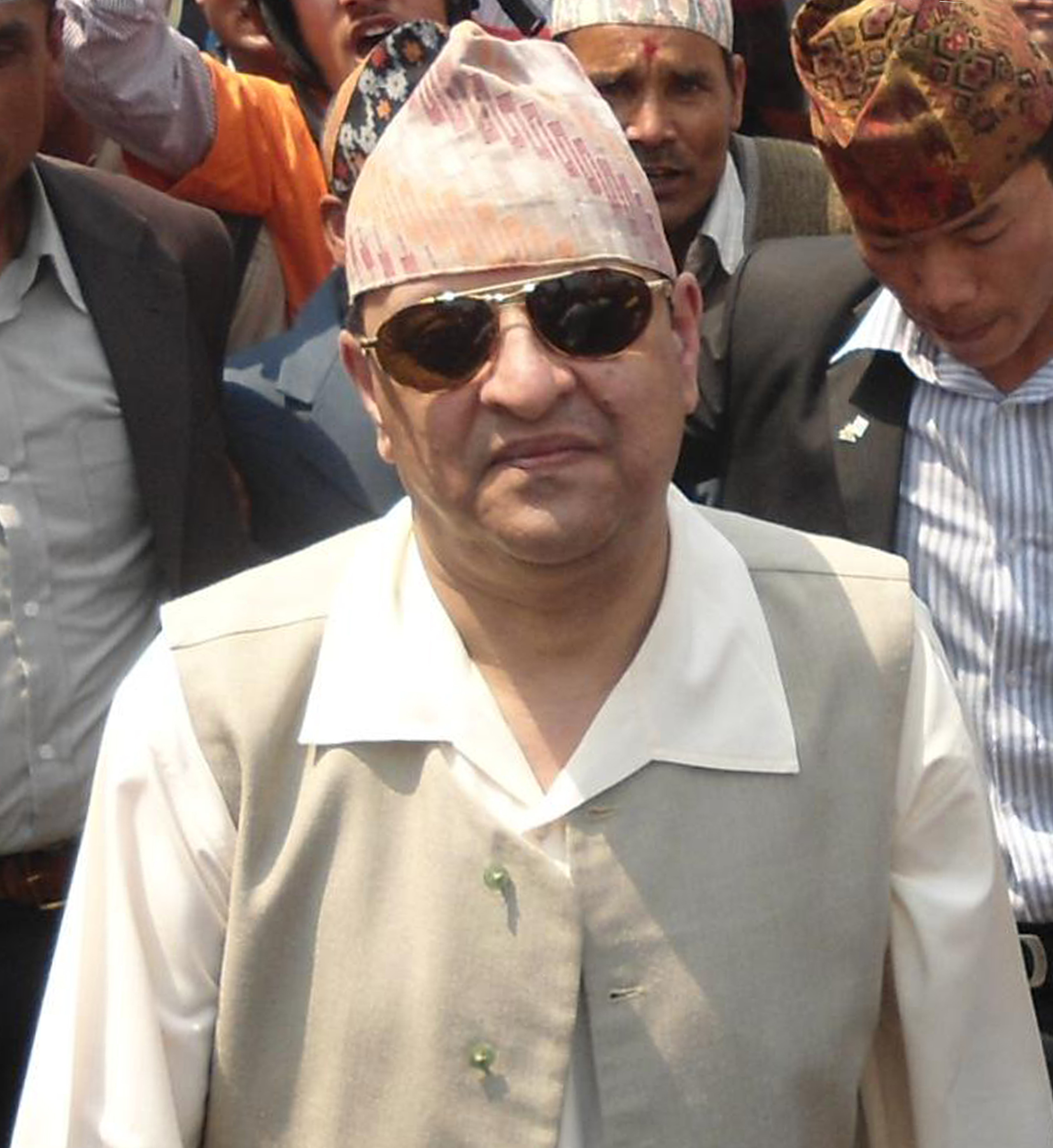
King Gyanendra Bir Bikram Shah; The Last Monarch of Nepal. After a decade of Civil War, monarchy was abolished. (2001-2008)

After Jana Andolan II, the King Gyanendra restore the assembly which was dissolved in 1999 ad, and following it, the parliament unilaterally strip power enshrined in 1990 constitution, and by it, it marked de facto end of 1990 constitution(which was formed after Jana Andolan I). On 24 December 2007, Nepal's Provisional Parliament met. It was decided that the monarchy would be abolished in 2008 after the Constituent Assembly elections. The motion enjoyed overwhelming support in the chamber, passing by a 270-vote majority. Of the 329 sitting members of parliament, only three voted against abolishing the monarchy. It was decided that for the time being, Gyanendra would retain his title and continue residing in the Royal Palace, albeit stripped of all political power and authority.

On 28 May 2008, following scheduled elections, the 1st Nepalese Constituent Assembly declared Nepal a Federal Democratic Republic and the monarchy was abolished, removing the Shah dynasty from power. Kul Bahadur Gurung said of the 601 member assembly, 560 voted in favour, 4 were against and 37 were absent or abstained. Following an Assembly agreement involving the Nepali Congress and both Nepalese Communist parties, (the Leninists and the much larger Maoist faction), Gyanendra stepped down.

Gyanendra vacated the palace in Kathmandu which later became a museum. Until they could find permanent accommodation, the royal couple were offered residence as commoners at the Nagarjuna Palace, a former royal summer residence. The Nagarjuna palace lies in forested hills about eight kilometres (five miles) northwest of Kathmandu.

== Post-Abolition Loyalism ==
The dynasty was conclusively deposed in 2008 due to the Nepalese royal massacre and the subsequent Nepalese Civil War. However, there are still loyalists to the dynasty, as evidenced by the Rastriya Prajatantra Party, the 2023 Nepalese pro-monarchy protests and 2025 Nepalese pro-monarchy protests. During the 2025 Nepalese Gen Z protests, a group of protesters also expressed loyalty to the abolished monarchy and rallied in support of its restoration.

== Monarchs of Shah dynasty (1559–2008) ==
=== Monarchs of Shah dynasty of Gorkha (1559–1768) ===
The following is list of all ten kings of Gorkha hill principality.

Name	Lifespan	Reign start	Reign end	Notes	Family	Image
Dravya Shah: राजा द्रव्य शाह	died 1570	1559	1570	Son of Yasho Brahma Shah	Shah	
Purna Shah/Purendra Shah: पूर्ण शाह/ पूरेन्द्र शाह	died 1605	1570	1605	Son of Dravya Shah	Shah	
Chatra Shah: छत्र शाह	died 1609 (heirless)	1605	1609	First son of Purendra/Purna Shah	Shah	
Ram Shah: Ram Shah The Just; श्रीमन्त महाराजधिराज राम शाह	died 1636	1609	1633 (abdicated)	Second son of Purna/Purendra Shah adopted title of Svasti Sri Giriraj	Shah	Ram Shah of Gorkha
Dambar Shah: डम्वर शाह	died 1645	1633	1645	Son of Ram Shah	Shah	
Krishna Shah: श्रीकृष्ण शाह	died 1661	1645	1661	Son of Dambar Shah	Shah	
Rudra Shah: रुद्र शाह	died 1673	1661	1673	Son of Krishna Shah	Shah	
Prithvipati Shah: पृथ्वीपत्ति शाह	died 1716	1673	1716	Son of Rudra Shah	Shah	
Nara Bhupal Shah: नरभूपाल शाह	1697 – 3 April 1743	1716	1743	Grandson of Prithvipati Shah and Son of Prince Birbhadra Shah	Shah	
Prithvi Narayan Shah: बडामहाराजधिराज पृथ्वीनारायण शाह	7 January 1723 – 11 January 1775 (aged 52)	1743	25 September 1768	Son of Nara Bhupal Shah	Shah	Prithvi Narayan Shah of Gorkha

=== Monarchs of Shah dynasty of Patan (1761–1765) ===
Name	Lifespan	Reign start	Reign end	Notes	Family	Image
Dal Mardan Shah: राजा दल मर्दन शाह	?—?	1761	1765	Son of Nara Bhupal Shah	Shah	

=== Monarchs of Shah dynasty of Nepal (1768–2008) ===
Name	Lifespan	Reign start	Reign end	Notes	Family	Image
Prithvi Narayan Shah: बडामहाराजधिराज पृथ्वीनारायण शाह	7 January 1723– 11 January 1775 (aged 52)	25 September 1768	11 January 1775	Son of Nara Bhupal Shah	Shah	Prithvi Narayan Shah of Nepal
Pratap Singh Shah: प्रतापसिंह शाह	16 April 1751 – 17 November 1777 (aged 26)	11 January 1775	17 November 1777	Son of Prithvi Narayan Shah	Shah	Pratap Singh Shah of Nepal
Rana Bahadur Shah: रण बहादुर शाह	25 May 1775 – 25 April 1806 (aged 30)	17 November 1777	8 March 1799 (abdicated)	Son of Pratap Singh Shah	Shah	Rana Bahadur Shah of Nepal
Girvan Yuddha Bikram Shah: गीर्वाणयुद्ध विक्रम शाह	19 October 1797 – 20 November 1816 (aged 19)	8 March 1799	20 November 1816	Son of Rana Bahadur Shah	Shah	Girvan Yuddha Bikram Shah of Nepal
Rajendra Bikram Shah: राजेन्द्र बिक्रम शाह	3 December 1813 – 10 July 1881 (aged 67)	20 November 1816	12 May 1847 (abdicated)	Son of Girvan Yuddha Bikram Shah	Shah	Rajendra Bikram Shah of Nepal
Surendra Bikram Shah: सुरेन्द्र बिक्रम शाह	20 October 1829 – 17 May 1881 (aged 51)	12 May 1847	17 May 1881	Son of Rajendra Bikram Shah	Shah	Surendra Bikram Shah of Nepal
Prithvi Bir Bikram Shah: पृथ्वी वीर बिक्रम शाह	18 August 1875 – 11 December 1911 (aged 36)	17 May 1881	11 December 1911	Grandson of Surendra Bikram Shah	Shah	Prithvi Bir Bikram Shah of Nepal
Tribhuvan Bir Bikram Shah (1st reign): त्रिभुवन वीर बिक्रम शाह	30 June 1900 – 13 March 1955 (aged 54)	11 December 1911	7 November 1950 (went into exile)	Son of Prithvi Bir Bikram Shah	Shah	Tribhuvan Bir Bikram Shah of Nepal
Gyanendra Bir Bikram Shah (1st reign): ज्ञानेन्द्र वीर बिक्रम शाह	7 July 1947 (age 79)	7 November 1950	7 January 1951 (stepped down)	Grandson of Tribhuvan Bir Bikram Shah	Shah	Gyanendra Bir Bikram Shah of Nepal
Tribhuvan Bir Bikram Shah (2nd reign): त्रिभुवन वीर बिक्रम शाह	30 June 1900 – 13 March 1955 (aged 54)	7 January 1951	13 March 1955	Son of Prithvi Bir Bikram Shah	Shah	Tribhuvan Bir Bikram Shah of Nepal
Mahendra Bir Bikram Shah: महेन्द्र वीर बिक्रम शाह	11 June 1920 – 31 January 1972 (aged 51)	14 March 1955	31 January 1972	Son of Tribhuvan Bir Bikram Shah	Shah	Mahendra Bir Bikram Shah of Nepal
Birendra Bir Bikram Shah: वीरेन्द्र वीर बिक्रम शाह	28 December 1945 – 1 June 2001 (aged 55)	31 January 1972	1 June 2001 (assassinated)	Son of Mahendra Bir Bikram Shah	Shah	Birendra Bir Bikram Shah of Nepal
Dipendra Bir Bikram Shah: दीपेन्द्र वीर बिक्रम शाह	27 June 1971 – 4 June 2001 (aged 29)	1 June 2001	4 June 2001 (declared braindead)	Son of Birendra Bir Bikram Shah	Shah	Dipendra Bir Bikram Shah of Nepal
Gyanendra Bir Bikram Shah (2nd reign): ज्ञानेन्द्र वीर बिक्रम शाह	7 July 1947 (age 79)	4 June 2001	28 May 2008 (Monarchy abolished)	Son of Mahendra Bir Bikram Shah	Shah	Gyanendra Bir Bikram Shah of Nepal

== Paternal roots of Shah dynasty ==
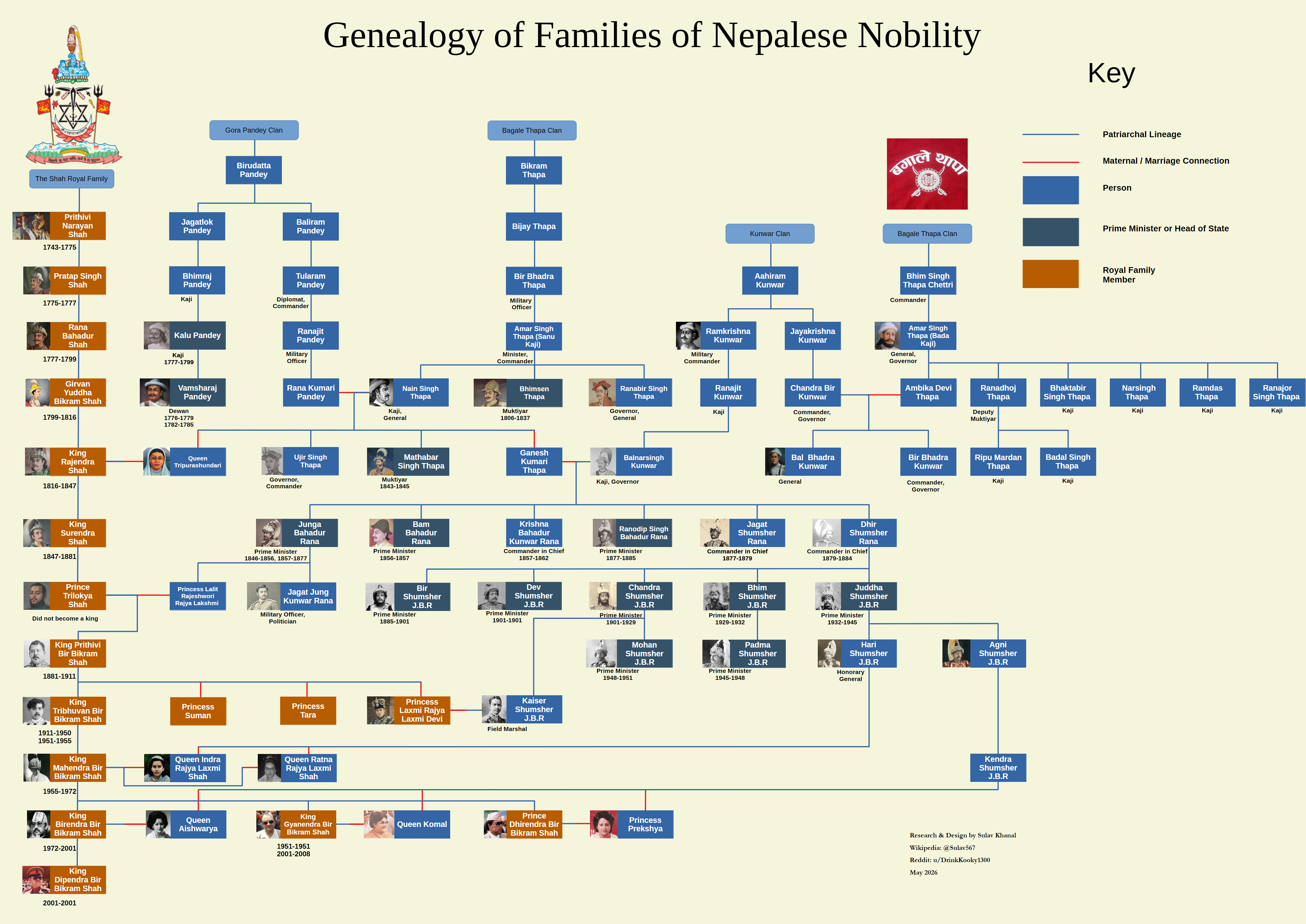
Genealogical chart of the noble families of Nepal connected to the Shah dynasty.

The Chart to the right includes all the Shah kings (1768-2008) from Prithivi Narayan Shah to Gyanendra Shah. The yellow boxes represent royal blood. The Rana family has married into the royal family multiple times. Kalu Pande, Amar Singh Thapa, Ramkrishna Kunwar, Vamsharaj Pande, and Damodar Pande served as general/commander during the unification of Nepal.

King Birendra and his father, Mahendra Bir Bikram Shah, and his father, Tribhuvan Bir Bikram Shah, were all married into the Rana family. Jung Bahadur Rana's daughter was married to Trilokya Bikram Shah, but they did not have any children.

Prithvi Narayan Shah	Narendra Rajya Lakshmi Devi (Rajput)
Pratap Singh Shah	Rajendra Rajya Lakshmi Devi (Thakuri)
Rana Bahadur Shah	Kantavati Devi (Maithil Brahmin)
Girvan Yuddha Bikram Shah	Gorakshya Rajya Lakshmi Devi (unknown)
Rajendra Bikram Shah	Samrajya Lakshmi Devi (Rajput)
Surendra Bikram Shah	Trailokya Rajya Lakshmi Devi (Thakuri)
Trailokya, Crown Prince of Nepal (died as prince)	Lalit Rajeshwari Rajya Lakshmi Devi (Chhetri)
Prithvi Bir Bikram Shah	Divyeshwari Rajya Lakshmi Devi (Rajput)
Tribhuvan Bir Bikram Shah	Kanti Rajya Lakshmi Devi (Rajput)
Mahendra Bir Bikram Shah	Indra Rajya Lakshmi Devi (Chhetri)
Birendra Bir Bikram Shah	Aishwarya Rajya Lakshmi Devi (Chhetri)
Dipendra Bir Bikram Shah

== See also ==
- Nepalese royal massacre

== Books ==
- Wright, Daniel (1877), History of Nepal, Cambridge University Press
- Hamilton, Francis Buchanan (1819), An Account of the Kingdom of Nepal, and the Territories Annexed to this Dominion by the House of Gorkha, A Constable
- Vansittart, Eden (1915). Gurkhas: Handbooks for the Indian Army (PDF). India: Superintendent Government Printing.
- Lecomte-Tilouine, Marie (2009). The Enigmatic Pig: On Magar Participation in the State Rituals of Nepal". Hindu Kingship, Ethnic Revival, and Maoist Rebellion in Nepal, pp. 81–120. Delhi: Oxford University Press.
