= Kulamandan Khand Shah =

Kulamandan Khand 'Shah' कुलमण्दन खाँड

King of Lamjung and Kaski
- Predecessor: Position established
- Successor: Yashobrahma Shah
- Born: Nepal
- Died: Nepal
- Issue: Kalu Shah; Yasho Brahma Shah
- Dynasty: Shah dynasty
- Father: Jagadev Khand
- Religion: Hinduism - Sanatan Dharma

Kulamandan Khand (Nepali: कुलमण्दन खाँड) was the founder of the Shah dynasty in Nepal and the ancestor of King Prithivi Narayan Shah. His son Yasho Brahma Shah succeeded him as King of Lamjung and Kaski. His eldest son Narhari Shah became ruler of Lamjung while the second son ruled over Kaski. His youngest son, Dravya Shah, ruled the Kingdom of Gorkha.

Historically, the Khand kings were closely related to the Magars. According to locals, members of the community who consume local alcohol are called Magars, while non-drinkers change their caste and start writing Khand Thakuri. Both the Magar and Khand Thakuri communities worship Kuldetia or Kul-Puja Alamdevi temple (Nepal's former Shah King's maternal or family deity) in Syangja district, which requires a Magar priest (Maski Rana Magar). National and international historians and anthropologists such as Rajaram Subedi and Francis Buchanan-Hamilton, who studied them, stated that Khand (Thakuri) and Magar are two brothers, Khancha Khand and Mincha Khand, which is also a Magar language.

His successors are as follows:

S.No.	Name of the Ruler	Ruled Period	Kingdom
1.	Yasho Brahma Shah or Yasobam Shah (यशेाब्रह्म शाह)	Unknown	Lamjung and Kaski
2.	Dravya Shah (द्रब्य शाह)	1559–1570, 11 years	Gorkha Kingdom
3.	Purna Shah (पूर्ण शाह)	1570–1605, 35 years	Gorkha Kingdom
4.	Chatra Shah (छत्र शाह)	1605–1609, 4 years	Gorkha Kingdom
5.	Rama Shah (राम शाह)	1609–1633, 28 years	Gorkha Kingdom
6.	Dambar Shah (डम्बर शाह)	1633–1645, 12 years	Gorkha Kingdom
7.	Krishna Shah (कृष्ण शाह)	1645–1661, 16 years	Gorkha Kingdom
8.	Rudra Shah (रूद्र शाह)	1661–1673, 12 years	Gorkha Kingdom
9.	Prithvipati Shah (पृथ्वीपति शाह)	1673–1716, 43 years	Gorkha Kingdom
10.	Nara Bhupal Shah (नरभुपाल शाह)	1716–1743, 27 years	Gorkha Kingdom
11.	Prithvi Narayan Shah (पृथ्वीनारायण शाह)	1743–1775, 32 years	Kingdom of Nepal
