= List of state leaders in 17th-century South Asia =

This is a list of state leaders in the 17th century (1601–1700) AD, of South Asia. These polities are generally sovereign states, but excludes minor dependent territories, whose leaders can be found listed under territorial governors in the 17th century. For completeness, these lists can include colonies, protectorates, or other dependent territories that have since gained sovereignty.

== Bengal and Northeast India ==
- Ahom kingdom (complete list) –

- Sukhaamphaa, King (1552–1603)
- Susenghphaa, King (1603–1641)
- Suramphaa, King (1641–1644)
- Sutingphaa, King (1644–1648)
- Sutamla, King (1648–1663)
- Supangmung, King (1663–1670)
- Sunyatphaa, King (1670–1672)
- Suklamphaa, King (1672–1674)
- Suhung, King (1674–1675)
- Gobar Roja, King (1675–1675)
- Sujinphaa, King (1675–1677)
- Sudoiphaa, King (1677–1679)
- Sulikphaa, King (1679–1681)
- Supatphaa, King (1681–1696)
- Sukhrungphaa, King (1696–1714)

- Baro-Bhuyan (complete list) –

- Musa Khan, Chief (1599–1611)
- Masum Khan, Zamindar (1611–1623)

- Bhurshut (complete list) –

- Pratapnarayan, Maharaja (17th century)
- Naranarayan, Maharaja (17th century)
- Lakshminarayan, Maharaja (c.1695–1712)

- Cooch Behar (complete list) –

- Rup Narayan, Raja (1693–1714)

- Jaintia Kingdom –

- Dhan Manik, King (1596–1612)
- Jasa Manik, King (1612–1625)
- Sundar Ray, King (1625–1636)
- Chota Parbat Ray, King (1636–1647)
- Jasamanta Ray, King (1647–1660)
- Ban Singh, King (1660–1669)
- Pratap Singh, King (1669–1678)
- Lakshmi Narayan, King (1678–1694)
- Ram Singh I, King (1694–1708)

- Mallabhum (complete list) –

- Bir Hambir, King (1565–1620)
- Dhari Hambir Malla Dev, King (1620–1626)
- Raghunath Singha Dev, King (1626–1656)
- Bir Singha Dev, King (1656–1682)
- Durjan Singha Dev, King (1682–1702)

- Kingdom of Manipur (complete list) –

- Khaki Ngampa, King (1597–1652)
- Khunchaopa, King (1652–1666)
- Paikhompa, King (1666–1697)
- Chalailongpa, King (1697–1709)

- Sandwip

- Dilal Khan (1620-1666)

- Kingdom of Sikkim (complete list) –

- Phuntsog Namgyal, Chogyal (1642–1670)
- Tensung Namgyal, Chogyal (1670–1700)
- Chakdor Namgyal, Chogyal (1700–1717)

== Bhutan ==
- Bhutan (complete list) –

- Tenzin Drukgye, Druk Desis (1650–1655)
- Tenzin Drukdra, Druk Desis (1655–1667)
- Minjur Tenpa, Druk Desis (1667–1680)
- Tenzin Rabgye, Druk Desis (1680–1694)
- Gedun Chomphel, Druk Desis (1695–1701)

== Burma ==
- Hsipaw (complete list) –

- Hso Wai Hpa, Saopha (1675–1702)

== India ==
- Ahmadnagar Sultanate: Nizam Shahi dynasty of the Deccan (complete list) –

- Murtaza Nizam Shah II, Sultan (1600–1610)
- Burhan Nizam Shah III, Sultan (1610–1631)
- Hussain Nizam Shah III, Sultan (1631–1633)
- Murtaza Nizam Shah III, Sultan (1633–1636)

- Amber Kingdom (complete list) –

- Man Singh, King (1589–1614)
- Bhau Singh, King (1614–1621)
- Jai Singh I, King (1621–1667)
- Ram Singh I, King (1667–1688)
- Bishan Singh, King (1688–1699)
- Jai Singh II, King (1699–1743)

- Arakkal kingdom (complete list) –

- Abubakar I, Raja (1591–1607)
- Abubakar II, Raja (1607–1610)
- Muhammad Ali I, Raja (1610–1647)
- Muhammad Ali II, Raja (1647–1655)
- Kamal, Raja (1655–1656)
- Muhammad Ali III, Raja (1656–1691)
- Ali II, Raja (1691–1704)

- Bidar Sultanate of the Deccan (complete list) –

- Amir Barid Shah II, Sultan (1591–1601)
- Mirza Ali Barid Shah III, Sultan (1601–1609)
- Amir Barid Shah III, Sultan (1609–1619)

- Bijapur Sultanate: Adil Shahi dynasty of the Deccan (complete list) –

- Ibrahim Adil Shah II, Sultan (1580–1627)
- Mohammed Adil Shah, Sultan (1627–1657)
- Ali Adil Shah II, Sultan (1657–1672)
- Sikandar Adil Shah, Sultan (1672–1686)

- Banganapalle (complete list) –

- Muhammad Beg Khan, Kiladar (1665–1686)
- Muhammad Beg Khan-i-lung, Kiladar (1686–1725)

- Bansda (complete list) –

- Udaisimhji II, Raja Sahib (?–1701)

- Banswara (complete list) –

- Ajab Singh, Rai Rayan (1688–1706)

- Barwani (complete list) –

- Jodh Singh, Rana (1675–1700)
- Parbat Singh, Rana (1700–1708)

- Bhavnagar (complete list) –

- Ratanji, Thakur Sahib (1660–1703)

- Bhor (complete list) –

- Shankaraji Narayan Sacheev, Pant Sachiv (1697–1707)

- Bikaner

- Kings (complete list) –

- Rai Singh I, Rao (1571–1612)
- Dalpat, Raja (1612–1613)
- Sur Singh, Raja (1613–1631)
- Karan Singh, Raja (1631–1667)
- Anup Singh, Maharaja (1669–1698)
- Sarup Singh, Maharaja (1698–1700)
- Sujan Singh, Maharaja (1700–1735)

- Dewans (complete list) –

- Bhag Chand Bachhawat / Sur Singh, Dewan (1619–1620)
- Lakshmi Chand Bachhawat / Sur Singh, Dewan (1619–1620)

- Bundi (complete list) –

- Bhoj Singh, Rao Raja (1585–1608)
- Ratan Singh, Rao Raja (1608–1632)
- Chattar Sal Singh, Rao Raja (1632–1658)
- Bhao Singh, Rao Raja (1658–1682)
- Anirudh Singh, Rao Raja (1682–1696)
- Budh Singh, Rao Raja (1696–1730)

- Chamba (complete list) –

- Udai Singh, Raja (1690–1720)
- Ugar Singh, Raja (1720–1735)
- Raj Singh, Raja (1735–1794)
- Jit Singh, Raja (1794–1808)

- Kingdom of Cochin (complete list) –

- Keshava Rama Varma, Maharaja (1565–1601)
- Veera Kerala Varma, Maharaja (1601–1615)
- Ravi Varma I, Maharaja (1615–1624)
- Veera Kerala Varma, Maharaja (1624–1637)
- Godavarma, Maharaja (1637–1645)
- Veerarayira Varma, Maharaja (1645–1646)
- Veera Kerala Varma, Maharaja (1646–1650)
- Rama Varma I, Maharaja (1650–1656)
- Rani Gangadharalakshmi, Maharaja (1656–1658)
- Rama Varma II, Maharaja (1658–1662)
- Goda Varma, Maharaja (1662–1663)
- Veera Kerala Varma, Maharaja (1663–1687)
- Rama Varma III, Maharaja (1687–1693)
- Ravi Varma II, Maharaja (1693–1697)
- Rama Varma IV, Maharaja (1697–1701)

- Kingdom of Coorg (complete list) –

- Appaji Raja, Raja (16th-17th century)
- Muddu Raja I, Raja (1633–1687)
- Dodda Virappa, Raja (1687–1736)

- Danta (complete list) –

- Prithvisimhji Gajsinhji Barad Parmar, Maharana (1687–1743)

- Dharampur (complete list) –

- Sahadevji, Rana (1680–1727)

- Dholpur (complete list) –

- Gaj Singh, Rana (1699–1713)

- Dhrol (complete list) –

- Jasoji Hardolji, Thakur Sahib (16th-17th century)
- Bamanyanji Jasoji, Thakur Sahib (17th century)
- Hardholji Bamanyanji I, Thakur Sahib (17th century)
- Modji Hardholji, Thakur Sahib (?–1644)
- Kaloji I Panchanji, Thakur Sahib (1644–1706)

- Dungarpur (complete list) –

- Sesmal, Maharawal (1580–1606)
- Karam Singh II, Maharawal (1606–1609)
- Punja Raj, Maharawal (1609–1657)
- Girdhar Das, Maharawal (1657–1661)
- Jaswant Singh, Maharawal (1661–1691)
- Khuman Singh, Maharawal (1691–1702)

- Farooqui dynasty (complete list) –

- Bahadur Shah, Sultan (1597–1601)

- Garhwal Kingdom (complete list) –

- Prithvi Shah, King (1552–1614)
- Medini Shah, King (1614–1660)
- Fateh Shah, King (1660–1708)

- Gondal (complete list) –

- Sagramji I Kumbhoji, Thakur (1648–1713)

- Jaisalmer (complete list) –

- Bhim Singh, Rawal (1578–1624)
- Kalyan Singh, Rawal (1624–1634)
- Manohar Das Singh, Rawal (1634–1648)
- Ram-Chandra Singh, Rawal (1648–1651)
- Sabal Singh, Rawal (1651–1661)
- Amar Singh, Maharawal (1661–1702)

- Janjira (complete list) –

- Kasim Yaqut Khan II, Wazir (1676–1703)

- Jawhar (complete list) –

- Vikramshah I Nemshah Mukne, Raja (1640–1678)
- Patangshah I Vikramshah Mukne, Raja (1678–early 18th century)

- Jhabua (complete list) –

- Kesho Das, Raja (1584–1607)
- Karan Singh, Raja (1607–1610)
- Man Singh, Raja (1610–1677)
- Kushal Singh, Raja (1677–1723)

- Jind (complete list) –

- Choudhary Phula Singh, Raja (c.1652)
- Tiloka Singh, Raja (c.1687)
- Sukhachain, Raja (c.1676–1751)

- Jodhpur State (complete list) –

- Sur Singh, Sawai Raja (1595–1619)
- Gaj Singh I, Maharaja (1619–1638)
- Jaswant Singh, Maharaja (1638–c.1678)
- Indra Singh, Raja (1679–1679)
- Ajit Singh, Maharaja (1679–1724)

- Kahlur/ Bilaspur (complete list) –

- Kalyan Chand, Raja (1600–1636)
- Tara Chand, Raja (1636–1653)
- Dip Chand, Raja (1653–1665)
- Bhim Chand (Kahlur), Raja (1665–1692)
- Ajmer Chand, Raja (1692–1728)

- Kalahandi (complete list) –

- Jugasai Deo III, Raja (1693–1721)

- Karauli (complete list) –

- Kanwar Pal II, Maharaja (1691–1734)

- Khilchipur (complete list) –

- Anup Singh II, Dewan (1679–1715)

- Kishangarh (complete list) –

- Kishan Singh, Maharaja (1611–1615)
- Sahas Mal, Maharaja (1615–1618)
- Jag Mal, Maharaja (1617–1629)
- Hari Singh, Maharaja (1629–1643)
- Rup Singh, Maharaja (1643–1658)
- Man Singh, Maharaja (1658–1706)

- Kota (complete list) –

- Ram Singh I, Maharao (1696–1707)

- Kothi (complete list) –

- Lal Jagat Rai Singh Baghel, Rais (1650-1675)
- Lal Angadh Rai Singh Baghel, Rais (1675-1701)

- Kumaon Kingdom: Chand (complete list) –

- Lakshmi Chand, King (1597–1621)
- Dilip Chand, King (1621–1624)
- Vijay Chand, King (1624–1625)
- Trimal Chand, King (1625–1638)
- Baz Bahadur Chand, King (1638–1678)
- Udyot Chand, King (1678–1698)
- Gyan Chand, King (1698–1708)

- Kingdom of Kutch (complete list) –

- Bharmalji I, King (1585–?)
- Bhojrajji, King (1631–?)
- Khengarji II, King (1645–?)
- Tamachi, King (1654–?)
- Rayadhan II, King (1665–?)
- Pragmalji I, King (1698–1715)

- Limbdi (complete list) –

- Verisalji I Aderajj, Thakur Sahib (17th–18th century)

- Lunavada (complete list) –

- Bir Singh, Rana (1674–1711)

- Madurai Nayak dynasty (complete list) –

- joint rulers group II, King (1595–1602)
- Muttu Krishnappa Nayak, King (1602–1609)
- Muttu Virappa Nayak, King (1609–1623)
- Tirumala Nayaka, King (1623–1659)
- Muthu Alakadri Nayak, King (1659–1662)
- Chokkanatha Nayak, King (1662–1682)
- Rangakrishna Muthu Virappa Nayak, King (1682–1689)
- Rani Mangammal, Queen (1689–1704)

- Malerkotla (complete list) –

- Sher Muhammad Khan Bahadur, Nawab (1672–1712)

- Mandi (complete list) –

- Keshab Sen, Raja (1595–1616 or 1574–1604)
- Hari Sen, Raja (1616–1637 or 1604–1637)
- Suraj Sen, Raja (1637–1664 or 1623–1658)
- Shyam Sen, Raja (1664–1679 or 1658–1673)
- Gaur Sen, Raja (1679–1684 or 1673–1678)
- Sidhi Sen, Raja (1684–1727 or 1678–1719)

- Maratha Empire (complete list) –

- Shivaji, Chhatrapati (1674–1680)
- Sambhaji, Chhatrapati (1680–1689)
- Rajaram I, Chhatrapati (1689–1700)
- Tarabai, Chhatrapati (1700–1707)

- Mayurbhanj (complete list) –

- Savesvara Bhanj Deo, Raja (1688–1711)

- Morvi (complete list) –

- Kanyoji Rawaji, Thakur Sahib (1698–1733)

- Mudhol (complete list) –

- Maloji Raje Ghorpade, Raja (1662–1700)
- Sardar Akhayaji Raje Ghorpade, Raja (1700–1734)

- Mughal Empire (complete list) –

- Jalal ud din Muhammad Akbar (Akbar the Great), Emperor (1556–1605)
- Nur ud din Muhammad Jahangir, Emperor (1605–1627)
- Shahab-ud-din Shah Jahan, Emperor (1627–1657)
- Muhiuddin Muhammad Aurangzeb Alamgir, Emperor (1658–1707)

- Kingdom of Mysore (complete list) –

- Raja Wodeyar I, Maharaja (1578–1617)
- Chamaraja Wodeyar VI, Maharaja (1617–1637)
- Raja Wodeyar II, Maharaja (1637–1638)
- Kanthirava Narasaraja I, Maharaja (1638–1659)
- Dodda Devaraja Wodeyar, Maharaja (1659–1673)
- Chikka Devaraja, Maharaja (1673–1704)

- Nagod (complete list) –

- Fakir Shah, Raja (1685–1721)

- Nawanagar (complete list) –

- Sataji Vibhaji, Jam Saheb (1569–1608)
- Jasaji Sataji, Jam Saheb (1608–1624)
- Lakhaji Ajaji, Jam Saheb (1624–1645)
- Ranmalji Lakhaji, Jam Saheb (1645–1661)
- Raisinhji Lakhaji, Jam Saheb (1661–1664)
- Tamachi Rainsinhji, Jam Saheb (1673–1690)
- Lakhaji Tamachi, Jam Saheb (1690–1708)

- Nayakas of Chitradurga (complete list) –

- Obanna Nayaka I, Chief (1588–1602)
- Kasturi Rangappa Nayaka I, Chief (1602–1652)
- Madakari Nayaka II, Chief (1652–1674)
- Obanna Nayaka II, Chief (1674–1675)
- Shoora Kantha Nayaka, Chief (1675–1676)
- Chikkanna Nayaka, Chief (1676–1686)
- Madakari Nayaka III, Chief (1686–1688)
- Donne Rangappa Nayaka, Chief (1688–1689)
- Bharamanna Nayaka, Chief 1689–1721)

- Nayakas of Keladi (complete list) –

- Hiriya Venkatappa Nayaka, Raja (1586–1629)
- Virabhadra Nayaka, Raja (1629–1645)
- Shivappa Nayaka, Raja (1645–1660)
- Chikka Venkatappa Nayaka, Raja (1660–1662)
- Bhadrappa Nayaka, Raja (1662–1664)
- Somashekara Nayaka I, Raja (1664–1672)
- Keladi Chennamma, Raja (1672–1697)
- Basavappa Nayaka, Raja (1697–1714)

- Orchha (complete list) –

- Ram Shah, Raja (1592–1605)
- Vir Singh Deo, Raja (1605–1626/27)
- Jhujhar Singh, Raja (1626/27–1635)
- Devi Singh, Raja (1635–1641)
- Pahar Singh, Raja (1641–1653)
- Sujan Singh, Raja (1653–1672)
- Indramani Singh, Raja (1672–1675)
- Jaswant Singh, Raja (1675–1684)
- Bhagwat Singh, Raja (1684–1689)
- Udwat Singh, Raja (1689–1735)

- Palanpur (complete list) –

- Firuz Kamal Khan, Diwan (1688–1704)

- Palitana (complete list) –

- Prithvirajji Kandhaji, Thakur Sahib (1697–1734)

- Panna (complete list) –

- Chhatrasal, Raja (1675–1731)

- Patna (complete list) –

- Chhatrasal, Raja (1675–1731)

- Porbandar (complete list) –

- Bhanji Sartanji, Rana (1699–1709)

- Pudukkottai (complete list) –

- Raghunatha Raya Tondaiman, King (1686–1730)

- Golconda Sultanate: Qutb Shahi dynasty of the Deccan (complete list) –

- Muhammad Quli Qutb Shah, Sultan (1580–1612)
- Sultan Muhammad Qutb Shah, Sultan (1612–1626)
- Abdullah Qutb Shah, Sultan (1626–1672)
- Abul Hasan Qutb Shah, Sultan (1672–1687)

- Rajgarh (complete list) –

- Mohan Singh, Rawat (1638–1714)

- Rajkot (complete list) –

- Mehramamji II Bamaniaji, Thakur Sahib (1694–1720)

- Rajpipla (complete list) –

- Durgshahji, Maharana (16th–17th century)
- Mohraj Ji, Maharana (17th century)
- Raishalji, Maharana (17th century)
- Chandrasinhji, Maharana (17th century)
- Gambhirsinhji I, Maharana (17th century)
- Subheraj Ji, Maharana (17th century)
- Jaisinhji, Maharana (17th century)
- Malraj, Maharana (17th century)
- Surmalji, Maharana (17th century)
- Udekaranji, Maharana (17th century)
- Chandrabhaji, Maharana (17th century)
- Chatrasalji, Maharana (17th century–1705)

- Ramnad estate (complete list) –

- Raghunatha Kilavan Sethupathi]], King (1678–1710)

- Ratlam (complete list) –

- Ratan Singh Rathore, Maharaja (1648–1658)
- Chhatrasal, Raja (1695–1706)

- Rewa (complete list) –

- Duryodhan Singh, Maharaja (1593–1618)
- Vikramaditya, Maharaja (1618–1630)
- Amar Singh II, Maharaja (1630–1643)
- Anoop Singh, Maharaja (1643–1660)
- Bhao Singh, Maharaja (1660–1690)
- Anirudh Singh, Maharaja (1690–1700)
- Avadhut Singh, Maharaja (1700–1755)

- Sawantwadi (complete list) –

- Khem Savant I, Chief (1627–1640)
- Som Savant, Chief (1640–1641)
- Lakham Savant, Chief (1641–1665)
- Phond Savant, Chief (1665–1675)
- Khem Savant II Bhonsle, Raja Sar Desai (1675–1709)

- Sirmur (complete list) –

- Karam Prakash, Raja (1616–1630)
- Mandhata Prakash, Raja (1630–1654)
- Sobhag Prakash, Raja (1654–1664)
- Budh Prakash, Raja (1664–1684)
- Mat Prakash, Raja (1684–1704)

- Sirohi (complete list) –

- Durjan Singh, Rao (1697–1705)

- Sisodia (complete list) –

- Amar Singh I, Rajput (1597–1620)
- Karan Singh II, Rajput (1620–1628)
- Jagat Singh I, Rajput (1628–1652)
- Raj Singh I, Rajput (1652–1680)
- Jai Singh, Rajput (1680–1698)
- Amar Singh II, Rajput (1698–1710)

- Sonepur (complete list) –

- Purusottam Singh Deo, Raja (1680–1700)
- Raj Singh Deo, Raja (1700–1725)

- Suket (complete list) –

- Jit Sen, Raja (1663–1721)

- Thanjavur Maratha kingdom (complete list) –

- Ekoji I, Raja (1675–1684)
- Shahuji I, Raja (1684–1712)

- Thanjavur Nayak kingdom (complete list) –

- Achuthappa Nayak, King (1560–1614)
- Raghunatha Nayak, King (1600–1634)
- Vijaya Raghava Nayak, King (1634–1673)

- Tripura: Manikya dynasty (complete list) –

- Yashodhar Manikya, Maharaja (1600–1623)
- Kalyan Manikya, Maharaja (1626–1660)
- Govinda Manikya, Maharaja (1660–1661, 1667–1673)
- Chhatra Manikya, Maharaja (1661–1667)
- Rama Manikya, Maharaja (1673–1685)
- Ratna Manikya II, Maharaja (1685–1693, 1695–1712)
- Narendra Manikya, Maharaja (1693–1695)

- Udaipur (complete list) –

- Amar Singh I, Maharana (1597–1620)
- Karan Singh II, Maharana (1620–1628)
- Jagat Singh I, Maharana (1628–1652)
- Raj Singh I, Maharana (1652–1680)
- Jai Singh, vassal Maharana (1680–1698)
- Amar Singh II, Maharana (1698–1710)

- Vijayanagara Empire: Araveeti dynasty (complete list) –

- Venkata II, King (1586–1614)
- Sriranga II, King (1614)
- Rama Deva Raya, King (1617–1632)
- Venkata III, King (1632–1642)
- Sriranga III, King (1642–1646)

- Wadhwan (complete list) –

- Bhagatsinhji Udaisinhji, Thakur Sahib (1681–1707)

- Wankaner (complete list) –

- Chandrasinhji I Raisinhji, Maharana Raj Shri (1679–1721)

- Yawnghwe (complete list) –

- Hkam Leng, Saopha (1695–1733)

- Zamorin of Calicut (complete list) –

- Asvati Tirunal, Samoothiri (1662)
- Puratam Tirunal, Samoothiri (1663)
- Uttrattati Tirunal, Samoothiri (1671–1684)

== Maldives ==
- Sultanate of the Maldives (complete list) –

Hilaalee dynasty
- Dom Philippe, King (1603–1632)
Utheemu dynasty
- Muhammad Imaduddin I, Sultan (1632–1648)
- Ibrahim Iskandar I, Sultan (1648–1687)
- Kuda Muhammad, Sultan (1687–1691)
- Muhammad Mohyeddine, Sultan (1691–1692)
Hilaalee dynasty
- Muhammad Shamsuddeen I, Sultan (1692)
Isdhoo Dynasty
- Mohamed IV, Sultan (1692–1701)

== Nepal ==
- Gorkha Kingdom –

- Dravya Shah, King (1559–1570)
- Purna Shah, King (1570–1605)
- Chatra Shah, King (1605–1609)
- Ram Shah, King (1609–1633)
- Dambar Shah, King (1633–1645)
- Krishna Shah, King (1645–1661)
- Rudra Shah, King (1661–1673)
- Prithvipati Shah, King (1673–1716)
- Ganesh Pande, Kaji (minister) (1559–1606)

- Malla rulers of Kantipur (complete list) –

- Shivasimha Malla, Raja (1583–1620)
- Lakshminarasimha Malla, Raja (1620–1641)
- Pratap Malla, Raja (1641–1674)
- Chakravartendra Malla, Raja (1669)
- Mahipatendra Malla, Raja (1670)
- Jayanripendra Malla, Raja (1674–1680)
- Parthivendra Malla, Raja (1680–1687)
- Bhupalendra Malla, Raja (1687–1700)
- Bhaskara Malla, Raja (1700–1714)

- Malla rulers of Lalitpur (complete list) –

- Harihara Simha, Raja (c.1600–1609)
- Shiva Simha, Raja (1609–1620)
- Siddhi Narasimha, Raja (1620–1661)
- Srinivasa Malla, Raja (1661–1685)
- Yoga Narendra Malla, Raja (1685–1705)

== Pakistan ==
- Khanate of Kalat (complete list) –

- Qambar Sani Khan Qambrani, Wali (1590–1601)
- Ahmad Khan Qambrani I, Wali (1601–1610)
- Suri Khan Qambrani, Wali (1610–1618)
- Qaisar Khan Qambrani, Wali (1618–1629)
- Ahmad Sani Khan Qambrani II, Wali (1629–1637)
- Altaz Khan Qambrani I, Wali (1637–1647)
- Kachi Khan Qambrani, Wali (1647–1656)
- Altaz Sani Khan Qambrani II, Wali (1656–1666)
- Mir Ahmad I Khan Qambrani III, Wali (1666–1695)
- Mir Mehrab Khan Ahmadzai I, Wali (1695–1697)
- Samandar Khan Ahmadzai, Wali (1697–1714)

== Sri Lanka ==
- Dutch Ceylon (complete list) –

Colony, 1656–1796
For details see the Dutch Republic under Western Europe

- Jaffna Kingdom (complete list) –

- Ethirimana Cinkam, King (1591–1616)
- Cankili II, King (1617–1619)
- Don Constantine, King (1619–1624, Portuguese puppet)

- Kingdom of Kandy (complete list) –

- Vimaladharmasuriya I, King (1590–1604)
- Senarat, King (1604–1635)
- Rajasinghe II, King (1635–1687)
- Vimaladharmasurya II, King (1687–1707)

- Portuguese Ceylon (complete list) –

Colony, 1505–1658
For details see the Kingdom of Portugal under Southwest Europe
