= Mansingh Khadka Magar =

16th-century king of Ligligkot

Mansingh Khadka was the king of Majhakot and Uppalokot in Gorkha until 1559. An annual running event called Liglig Daud whose winner was chosen as King Of Liglig-Kot Kingdom. Dravya Narayan Shah (youngest son of Yashobrahma) was invited by the Brahmins in particular Bhagirath Panth and Ganesh Pande.

Wednesday the 8th of Bhadon Badi, Saka 1481 (A.D. 1559) Rohini Nakshatra was an auspicious day. Dravya Shah, Bhagirath Panth, Ganesh Pande, Ganga Ram Rana Magar, Magar, Aryal, Bohra and khanal of Ligligkot. Dravya shah force attacked the Khadka kingdom King khadka.They traveled the Dahya Gauda route and the Durbar.On the kulpuja day of khadka king, they attacked the Khadka king while they were drunk and unprepared at last they captured gorkha. At the same moment Dravya Shah took his seat on the gaddi and named the newly found kingdom "Gorkha".

Dravya Shah used his army to invade neighboring states and his successors continued this aggression to increase the territory belonging to Gorkha By 1570, when Dravya Shah died, the running race was a forgotten memory.
