= Yasho Brahma Shah =

Yashobrahma Shah यशोब्रम्ह शाह

King of Lamjung and Kaski
- Predecessor: Kulamandan Shah Khad
- Successor: Narahari Shah
- Born: 16th century Nepal
- Died: 16th century Nepal
- Issue: Narahari Shah; Dravya Shah; Narendra Shah
- Dynasty: Shah dynasty
- Father: Kulamandan Shah Khand
- Mother: Sri Devi Khand
- Religion: Hinduism

Yasho Brahma Shah or Yasobam Shah (Nepali: यशोब्रह्म शाह) (dates unknown) was the King of Kaski and Lamjung. He was the youngest son of Kulamandan Shah Khad. His eldest son Narhari Shah succeeded him as King of Lamjung, while his second son ruled over Kaski. His youngest son, Dravya Shah, established the Gorkha Kingdom in 1559.

Preceded by Kulamandan Shah Khand	King of Lamjung ?–?	Succeeded by Narahari Shah

Preceded by Kulamandan Shah Khand	King of Kaski ?–?	Succeeded by unknown
