= Gorkha Palace =

Historic palace in Nepal

- गोरखा दरबार
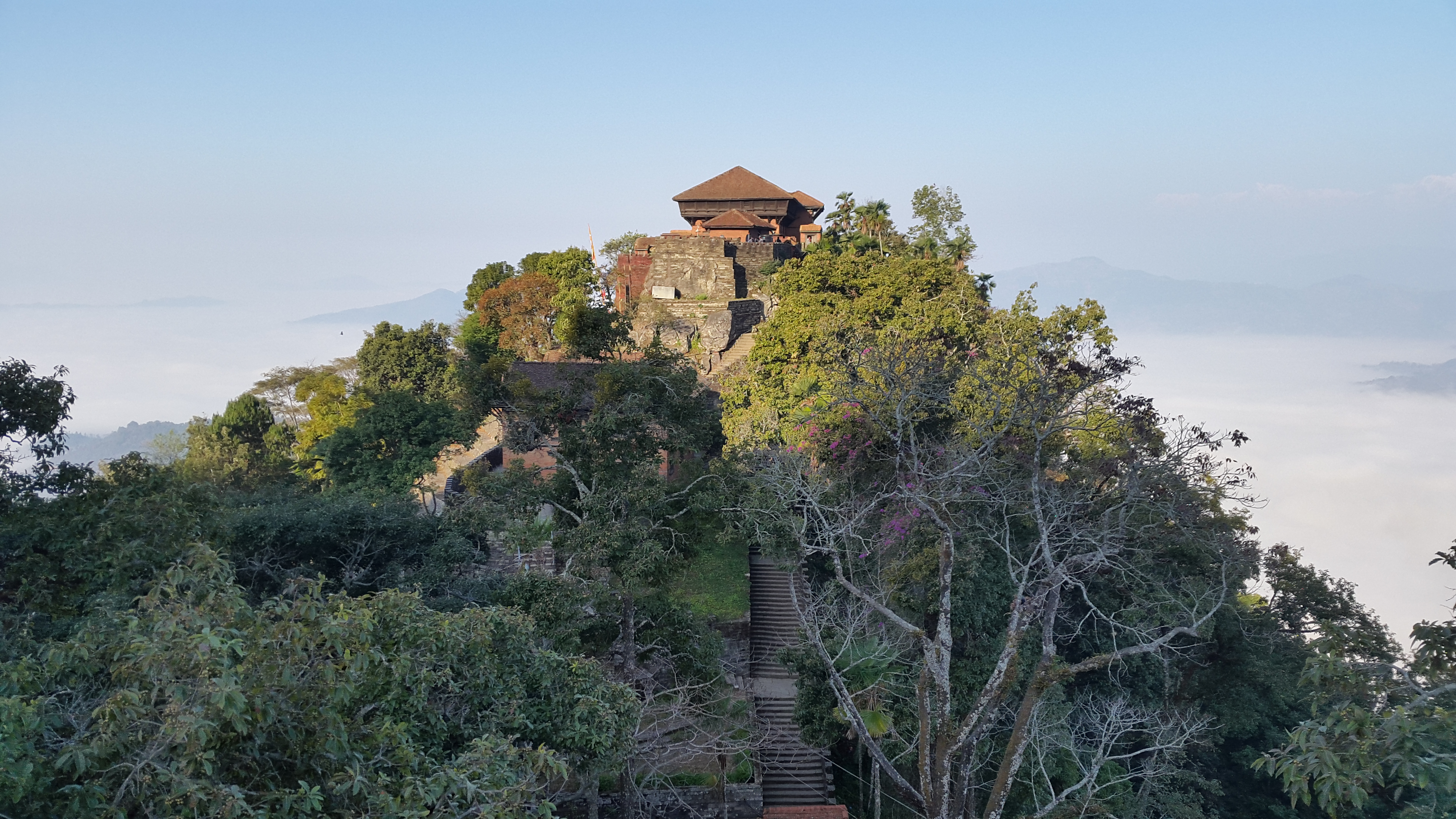
- Gorkha palace seen from afar

General information
- Architectural style: Traditional Newar architecture
- Location: Gorkha, Nepal
- Year built: 17th century (1630 AD)
- Cost: Unknown
- Client: King Ram Shah
- Owner: Government of Nepal

Technical details
- Structural system: Timber, Hill stones, and Clay bricks

The Gorkha Palace, located in the Gorkha district of Nepal, is a historic landmark built in the 17th century by Ram Shah. The palace is built on top of a hill at an altitude of about 1,000 meters (3,300 ft). This palace is an hour walk from the downtown Gorkha bazaar.

The palace is the birthplace of the king Prithvi Narayan Shah who was born in 1723 and started the unification of Nepal. Prithvi Narayan Shah was born in the Dhuni Pari, a part of the Palace.

== The Palace ==
The palace lies on the hilltop and is completely fortified. It is an example of Newari architecture. The walls of the palace are about three feet thick. The floors are supported by extended wooden beams.

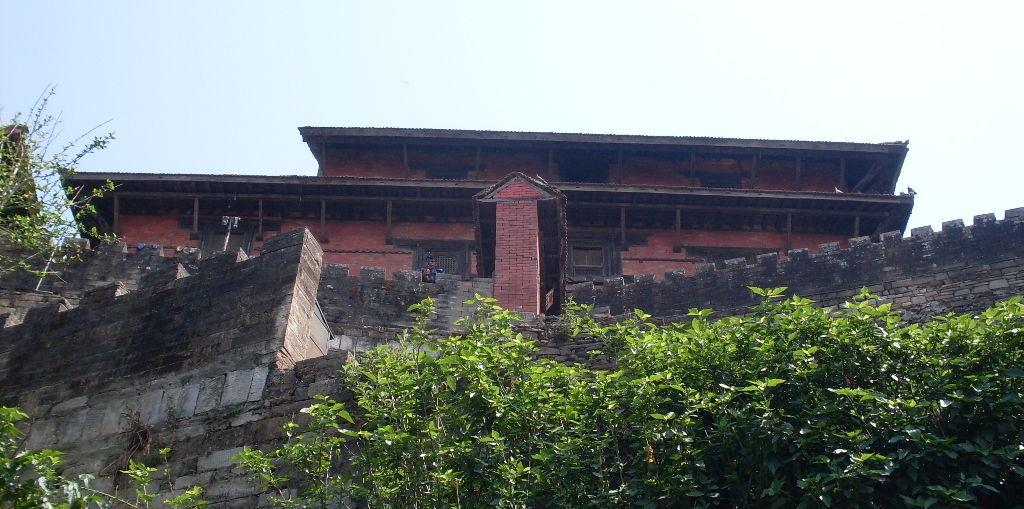
Fortification

== The Palace exemplifies architectural brilliance ==
The Gorkha Palace showcases a remarkable blend of traditional Newari architecture and strategic military design. Built primarily of wood and stone, the structure reflects the craftsmanship of Newari artisans and the architectural principles of the time from the Nepa Valley region (Outside Gorkha). Multiple levels and intricate wooden carvings characterize the palace, with each section serving both aesthetic and functional purposes.

=== Temples inside and near the Palace ===
Gorkha Durbar also has religious importance due to the placement of various Hindu temples inside the palace.

In the western part of the palace lies Kalika temple which was built during the 17th century. The temple has wooden carvings of birds, animals and deities.

The temple of Goddess Gorakhkali lies on the southwestern side of the palace.

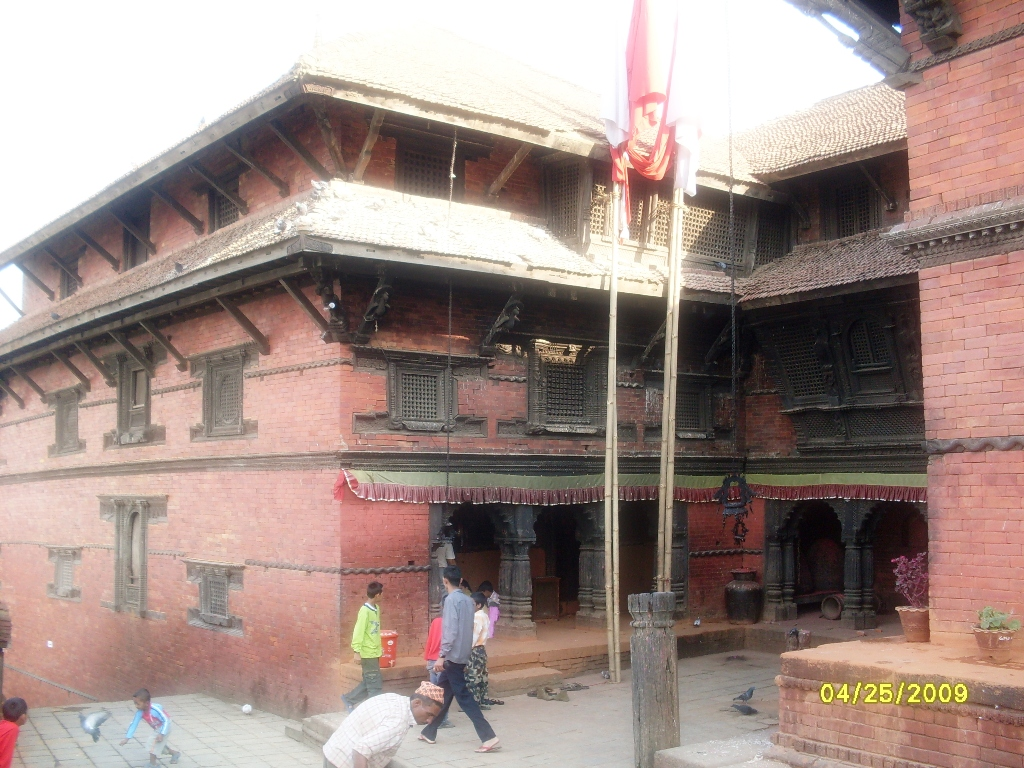
Gorakhkali Temple

The Goraknath temple is located near the Gorakhali temple. Goraknath was a Hindu yogi who was an influential founder of the Nath Hindu movement and also one of the two notable disciples of Matsyendranath. This place holds a fair every year on the day of Baisakh Purnima (the full moon day on the month of Baisakh) in Gorakhnath Cave. There is also a cave that is claimed as the shelter of Gorakhnath where he meditated Tantra.

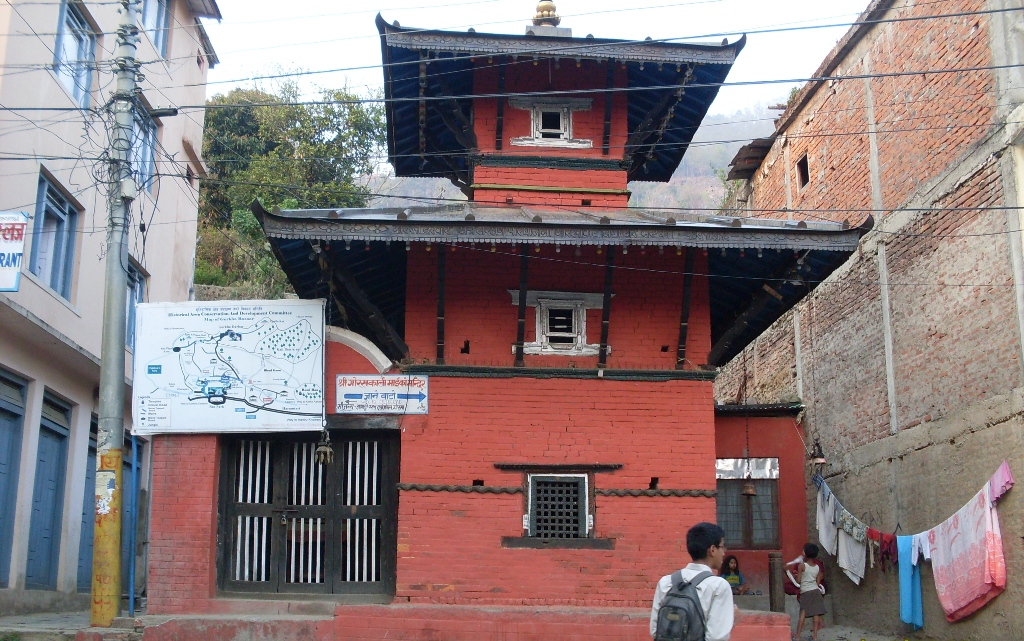
Gorkha Temple

=== Museum ===
The museum located inside the premises of the palace houses various items including armours, paintings and the Divya Upadesh of Prithvi Narayan Shah.

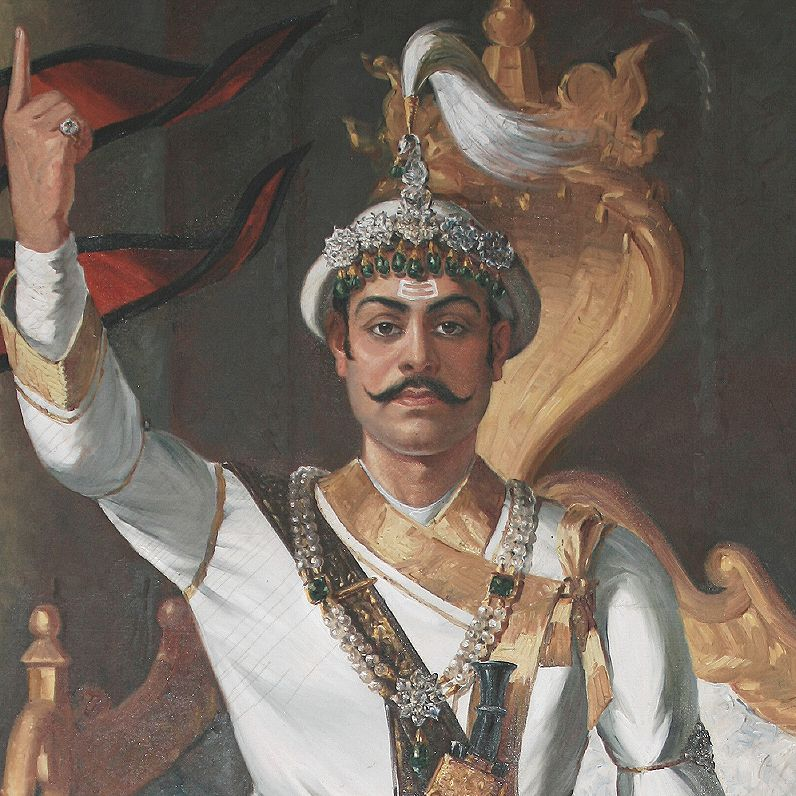
King Prithvi Narayan Shah

=== Surroundings ===
The palace also serves as a viewpoint to observe Manaslu, Himalchuli, Annapurna and Ganesh peaks of the Himalayas in the Northern side while planes of Gorkha and surrounding villages in the southern side.

The “eternal flame” lies on the southern part of the palace which has been lit since the unification of Nepal.

== Impact of 2015 earthquake ==
The April 2015 Nepal earthquake partially damaged the palace. It took over two years for the reconstruction process to start by the Department of Archeology and the work started on November 15, 2017. As of 2022, the repair work is still ongoing.

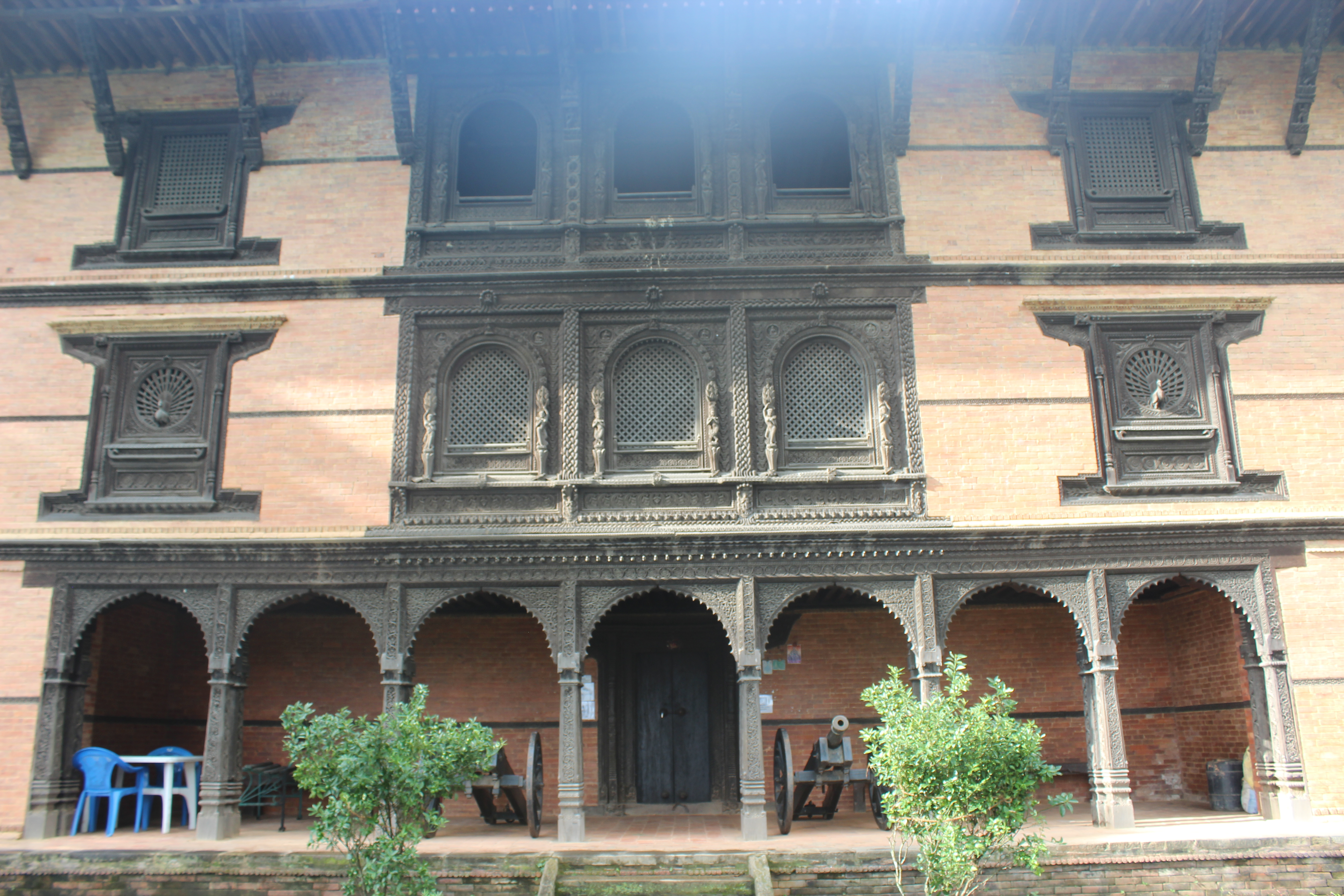
Tallo Durbar (Lower Palace)

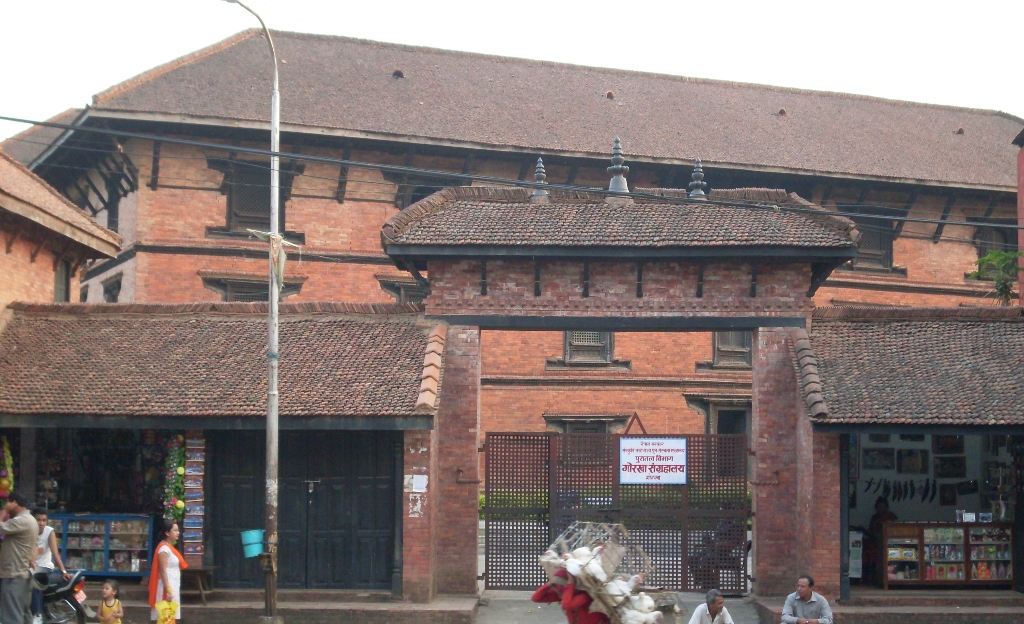
Museum

== Tourism ==
According to the Gorkha Museum, 48,233 people visited the palace in 2015–2016. In 2016–2017, there were 72,648 visitors and in 2017–2018, there were 77,753 visitors.

== See also ==
- Gorkha Municipality
- Narayanhiti Palace
- Sita cave, believed to be the longest cave in Nepal
