= Ram Shah =

King of Gorkha Kingdom from 1606 to 1636

King Ram Shah राजा राम शाह
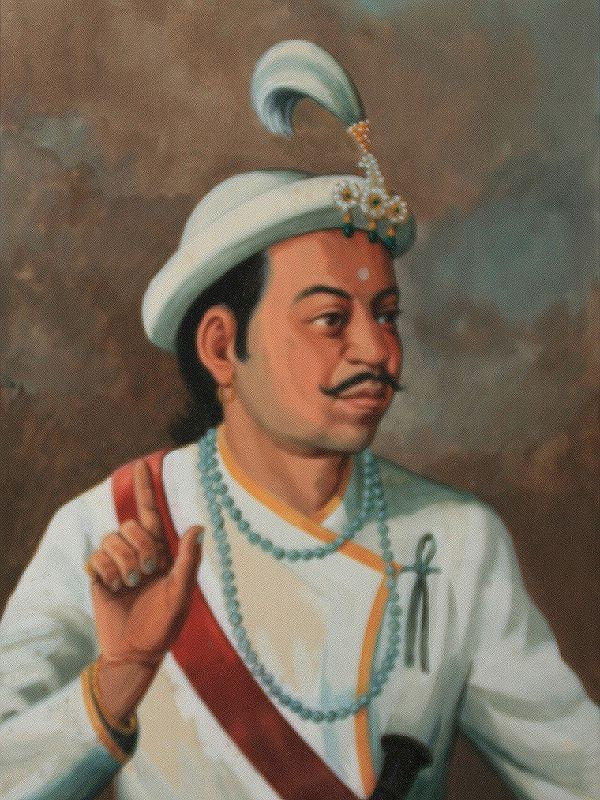

King of Gorkha Kingdom
- Reign: 1606–1636
- Coronation: 1606
- Predecessor: Chatra Shah
- Successor: Dambar Shah
- Born: 1550; Nepal
- Died: 1636 (aged 85–86); Gorkha, Gorkha Kingdom, Nepal
- Issue: Dambar Shah
- Dynasty: Shah dynasty
- Father: Purna Shah
- Religion: Hinduism

Ram Shah (Nepali: राम शाह; reign before 1606 – 1636) was a king of the Gorkha Kingdom (present-day Gorkha District, Nepal). He was the son of Gorkha king Purna Shah and brother of Chatra Shah. He acceded to the throne c. 1606 after his brother's death. He expanded his kingdom as far as the Trishuli River to the east, the Marshyangdi to the west, the Rasuwa to the north, and the Mahabharat Range to the west.

Shah was known as the "great conqueror" and "conscientious". He brought many changes to the Gorkha Kingdom, including fixed and uniform weights and measures, criminal codes, created a fixed rate of interest and built the Newar architecture palace Gorkha Palace. His statue is displayed at his Chautari where he used to administer justice to the people.

== Reign ==
When the first ruler of Gorkha Dravya Shah's son Purna Shah acceded in the throne, he ruled for about thirty-five years. Upon his death, his son Chatra Shah became the King and ruled the kingdom for about seven months until his death, as he did not have any children his brother Ram Shah acceded in the throne in c. 1606. Shah was described as "great conqueror" and "conscientious". He wanted to expand his kingdom which only consisted of Liglig, Gorkha, Siranchok and Ajirgarh.

Gorkha was neighbours with small kingdoms ruled by the Gurungs, Bhotias and the Thakuris. Shah started to expand his army and created a friendship between the kings of Palpa, Jumla, and Lalitpur. King Siddhi Narasimha Malla of Lalitpur, sent 24 merchants to live in Gorkha. In 1620, Ngawang Namgyal signed a friendship treaty with Shah; which allowed 50 people from the kingdom to live in Bhutan.

He began to colonise Barpak, Shyartan, Atharsaya Khola, Ferung, Khari, Meghi Charage, Niwarchok, Dhading; his conquest led the size of the kingdom far as the Trishuli River (east), the Marshyangdi (west), the Rasuwa, (north) and the Mahabharat Range (west). Fearing the rapid expansion of Gorkha, the Lamjung kings invaded the kingdom; which was unsuccessful and led them to withdraw their troops beyond Marshyandi. During the expansion, Kaji Ganesh Pandey led the army against Ghale Raja of Sallayan, in which the Kaji died in the combat. Shah was furious and ordered the soldiers to go back "for running from the field of battle and ordered them to go back to redeem their hounour, which they finally did". Ghale Raja was defeated and killed by a sword.

During his reign, there were not any "fixed and uniform weights and measures" which varied from location to location; in order to fix this, he brought standard weights and measures throughout the kingdom. Shah created a fixed rate of interest, money lenders were not able to charge more than 10% interest and if it was in the form of PIK loan not more than 25% interest. Though, if not paid within 10 years, the moneylenders were able to raise the amount double or triple if it was in PIK loan.

He created an agreement "for grazing grounds for the cattle in each and every village" and those who claimed them would be "severely dealt with"; punishment also extended to the people who cut down trees near a road. Shah introduced many titles including Kaji, Sardar, and Khardar. He introduced criminal codes; that created a saying around the kingdom "Nyaya napaye Gorkha janu (translation: If you don't get justice, go to Gorkha)”. He would "dispense justice and display fairness". During his reign, the Gorkha Palace, Newar architecture palace was built circa 1610; it was destroyed by the April 2015 Nepal earthquake.

== Personal life and legacy ==
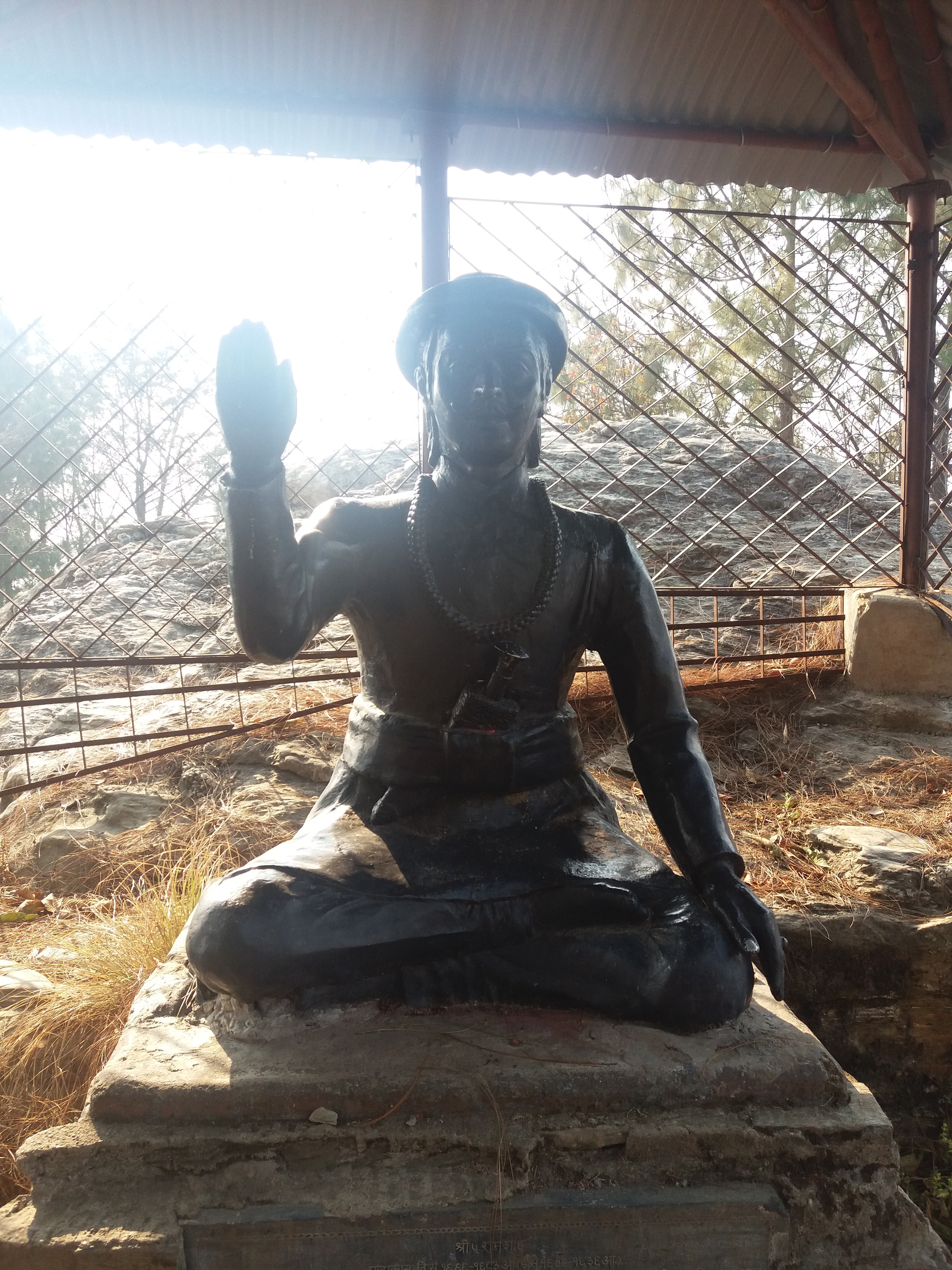
Statue of Ram Shah in Gorkha Durbar.

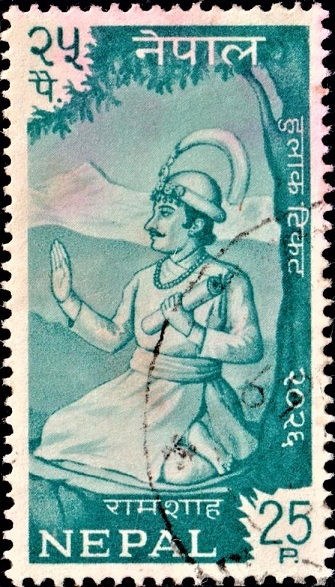
Nepali stamp featuring Shah c. 1969.

The birth date of Ram Shah is unknown; he was the brother of Chatra Shah. He was born to Purna Shah. Ram Shah asked King of Bhutan to send Lamas "to perform [the] rite for the peace in his family and for the birth of a son". They were successful; he had three sons including Dambar Shah. He followed the religion Hinduism. It was believed that he ruled the kingdom for about 27 years until his death in 1633; however, newly discovered information indicated he was ruling in 1636. So it was concluded that ruled until 1636. Upon his death, his wife committed sati or "burn[ed] on the funeral pyre with her husband".

In Gorkha, there is a statue of Ram Shah in Ram Shah's Chautari, where he used to provide justice to the people. His criminal code was used by his successors, including the last king of Gorkha and the first king of Nepal Prithvi Narayan Shah. It is said that wife of Ram Shah possessed the power of the Devi, following the death of Queen, and before revolutionary Lakhan Thapa Magar, another Saint 1st Lakhan Thapa Magar, who is also described as a spiritual guide for King Ram Shah and he also had a very close relationship with the Queen, who was also considered an incarnation of the Goddess Durga Bhawani, an incarnation of Parvati, in that place he Built a Manakamana Temple in Gorkha District and it is mandatory for a priest to be a Magar, the Main Priest must be a descendant of Saint Lakhan Thapa Magar. He was also noted for his justice system.

Preceded by Chatra Shah	King of Gorkha; 1606–1636	Succeeded by Dambar Shah
