= Gorkha kingdom =

Former kingdom in the Himalayas (1559–1768)

Gorkha Kingdom गोरखा राज्य
- 1559–1768
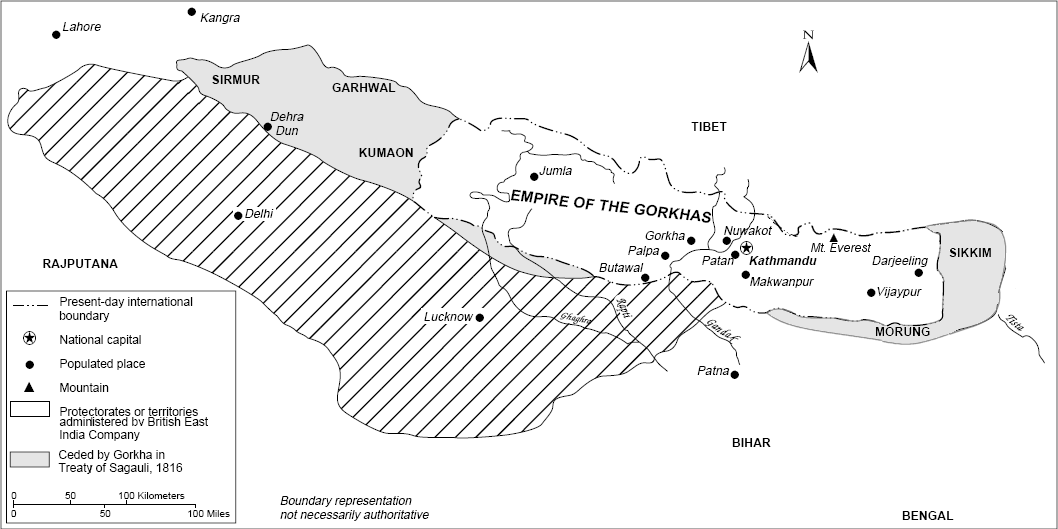
- Territorial expansion and vassal states of the Gorkha (later renamed Nepal), also known as the Gorkha Empire
- Status: Sovereign state
- Capital: Gorkha (seat: Gorkha Palace)
- Common languages: Khaskura
- Religion: Hinduism (official)
- Demonyms: Gorkhali; Gurkha
- Government: Absolute monarchy
- Mahārājā; Mahārājādhirāja
  - 1559–1570: Dravya Shah (first)
  - 1570–1605: Purna Shah (second)
  - 1605–1609: Chatra Shah (third)
  - 1609–1633: Ram Shah (fourth)
  - 1633–1645: Dambar Shah (fifth)
  - 1645–1661: Krishna Shah (sixth)
  - 1661–1673: Rudra Shah (seventh)
  - 1673–1716: Prithvipati Shah (eight)
  - 1716–1743: Nara Bhupal Shah (ninth)
  - 1743–1768: Prithvi Narayan Shah (tenth/last)
- Pradhan Senapati
  - 1559–TBD: Bhagirath Panta (first)
- History
  - Established: 1559
  - Disestablished: 1768
- Currency: Mohur
Preceded by	Succeeded by
Khasa Kingdom	Kingdom of Nepal
- Today part of: Nepal

The Gorkha Kingdom (Nepali: गोरखा राज्य; Gōrakhā Rājya) was an independent hill kingdom in the central Himalayas established in 1559 CE when the prince Dravya Shah of Kingdom of Lamjung seized control of the region. Its capital was centered around the hilltop fortress of Gorkha Palace, it was originally one of the Chaubisi (24) independent kingdoms that emerged following the fragmentation of Khasa-Malla Empire. Under its tenth monarch, Prithvi Narayan Shah, the kingdom began a rapid campaign of territorial expansion in 1743 CE.

By 1768 CE, through strategic warfare and blockades, Gorkha's borders had expanded outward from its original central hill base to encircle the Kathmandu Valley, reaching the Tibet border to the north, the Sunkoshi River and Mahabharata range to the east, the Churia hills and Makwanpur to the south, and the Marshyangdi River to the west. Following the conquest of the Kathmandu Valley, the capital was sifted to Kathmandu, and the kingdom was renamed to the Kingdom of Nepal in 1768 CE.

== Etymology ==
Guru Gorakhnath monument in Nepal.

The name Gorkha (Nepali: गोरखा / गोर्खा) is believed to have been derived from Goraksha (Sanskrit: गोरक्ष), a compound of go (गो), meaning "cow," and raksha (रक्ष्), meaning "protector." Literally translating to "cow-protector, the term originally denoted spiritual and pastoral guardianship within ancient Vedic and Hindu traditions. Over time, as Sanskrit evolved into the spoken Khasa Prakrit and hill dialects of the central Himalayas, Goraksha phonetically shifted to Gorakh, which ultimately developed into Gorkha.

Beyond its linguistic roots, the name is intimately linked to the 11th-century medieval warrior-saint Guru Gorakhnath, the revered founder of the Nath yogic tradition. Regional tradition holds that the saint meditated in a natural cave perched high on the hill ridge where the Gorkha Durbar fortress complex was later constructed. The surrounding settlement and hill took the name Gorkha in tribute to the saint, who was subsequently adopted as the guardian patron deity of the Shah royal house and the state's military forces. The gentilic term Gorkhali emerged to denote the subjects and soldiers of the kingdom, while Gurkha later became its widely recognized Anglicized variant through British military contact during the 19th century.

== History ==
The Gorkha Kingdom was established in 1559 CE by Dravya Shah, the youngest son of Yasho Brahma Shah, the king of Lamjung and Kaski, a hill principality in what is now western Nepal.

At the time, the area around Liglig and Gorkha was ruled by local Magar kings, notably King Dalshur Ghale Magar of ligligkot and King Mansingh Khadka Magar of Gorkha. These regions were part of the historical Magarat confederation, a loose alliance of Magar principalities.

Dravya Shah rose to power with the assistance of influential local Magars, including Gongaram Rana Magar, during the traditional Ligligkot race where the winner would assume kingship. After capturing Ligligkot, he went on to conquer Gorkhakot from King Mansingh Khadka Magar, thereby founding the Kingdom of Gorkha in 1559 CE.

The name Gorkha is believed to be derived from the yogi saint Gorakhnath, who is said to have blessed Dravya Shah's rise to power. His influence continues to be revered in the region, including at the Gorakhnath Temple in Gorkha.

Dravya Shah's descendants eventually unified much of what is now Nepal under the leadership of Prithvi Narayan Shah, initiating the unification of Nepal in the 18th century.

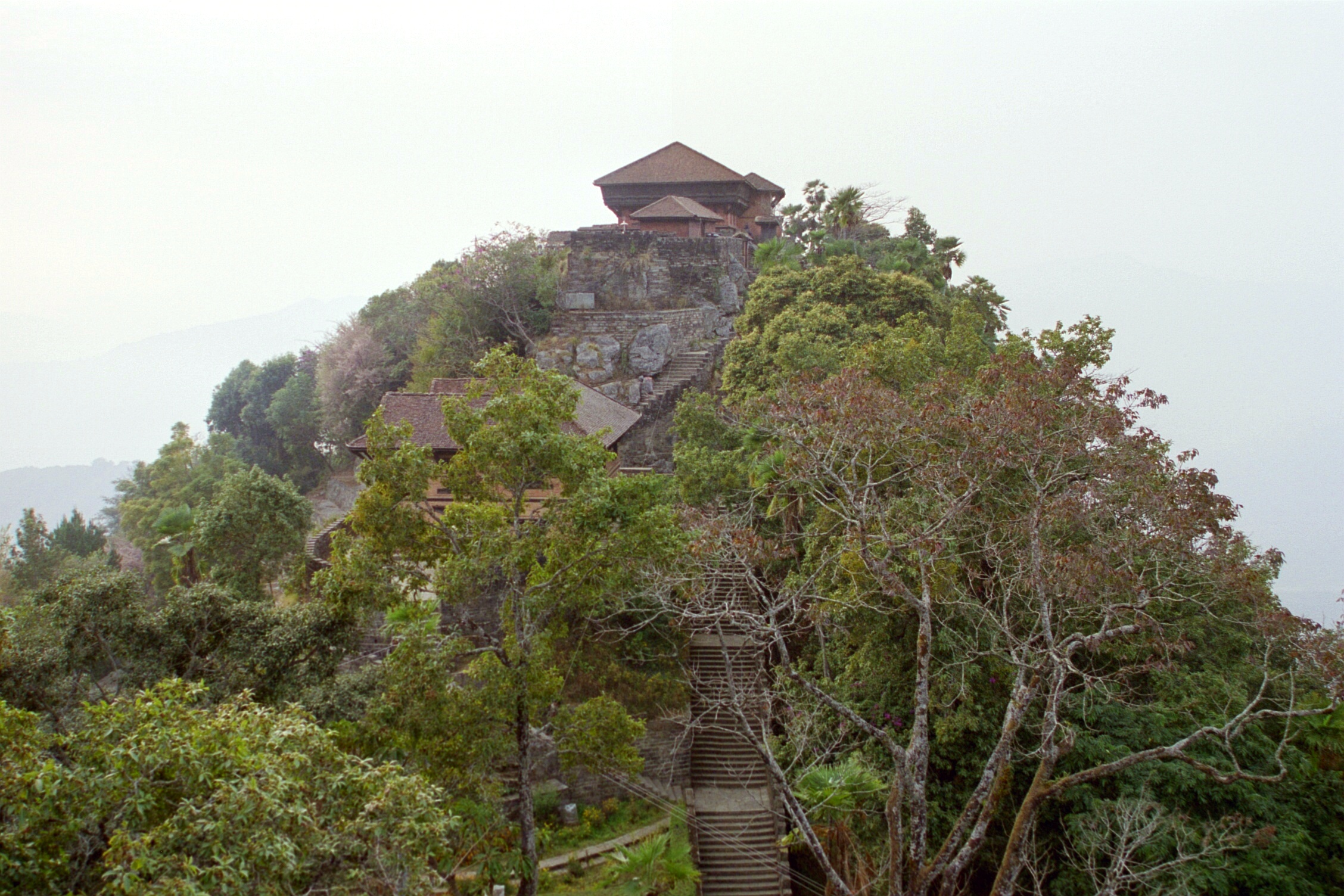
The old king's Darbar at Gorkha

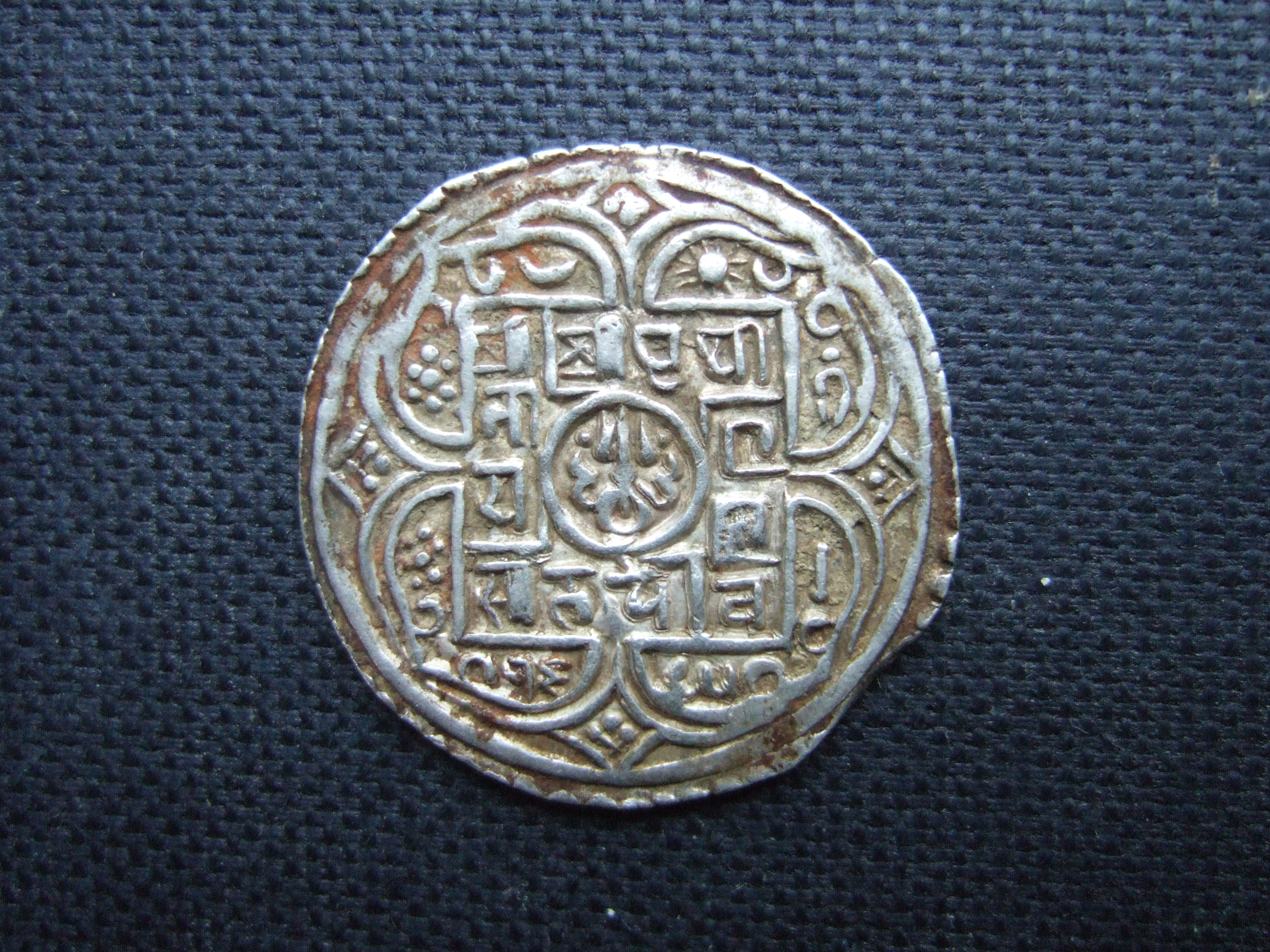
Mohar of Gorkha king Prithvi Narayan Shah dated Saka Era 1685 (1763 CE)

=== Expansion campaigns ===
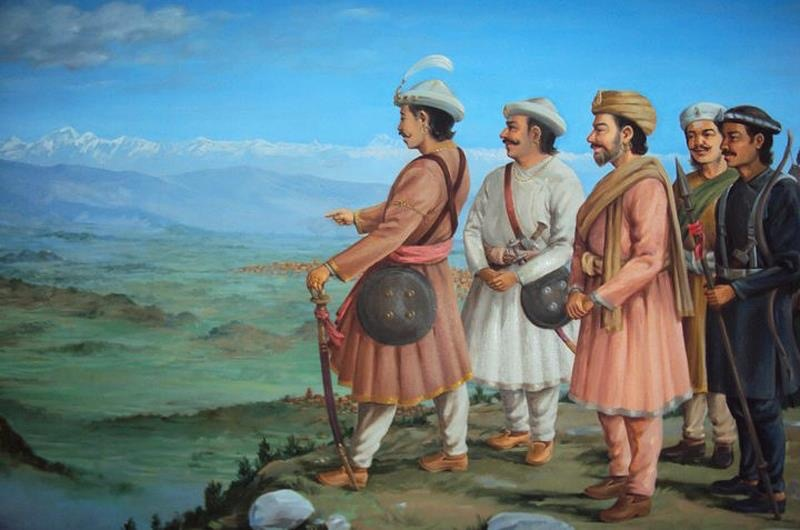
Prithvi Narayan Shah and his close advisors viewing the Kathmandu Valley from Chandragiri Hill top, planning their conquest.

From the 1730s, the Gorkha Kingdom began expanding under King Nara Bhupal Shah, although most of the significant conquests occurred during the reign of his son, Prithvi Narayan Shah, starting in 1743. His campaigns were later continued by his younger son, Bahadur Shah. Over time, they extended their control over large areas to the east and west of Gorkha.

Among their most important acquisitions was the wealthy Newar confederacy of Nepal Mandala, centered in the Kathmandu Valley. Beginning in the 1760s, the Gorkhalis imposed a blockade to weaken the valley’s kingdoms. In response, the Malla kings appealed to the British East India Company for assistance. In 1767, the Company sent an expedition led by Captain George Kinloch, which failed before reaching Kathmandu.

The three Newar capitals—Kathmandu, Lalitpur, and Bhaktapur—fell to the Gorkhalis between 1768 and 1769. Prithvi Narayan Shah then declared Kathmandu the new capital of his unified kingdom.

In 1788, the Gorkhalis turned their attention northward and invaded Tibet, seizing the towns of Kyirong and Kuti, and forcing the Tibetan government to pay tribute. When Tibet stopped the payments, the Gorkhas launched a second invasion in 1791, during which they looted the Tashilhunpo Monastery in Shigatse. In response, the Qing dynasty of China sent an army into Nepal. The Chinese forces advanced to Nuwakot but were halted due to stiff resistance and logistical challenges.

The Gorkha regent Bahadur Shah requested military assistance from the British, including 10 howitzers, but the arms deal fell through. Eventually, peace was negotiated, and the Sino-Nepalese War concluded with the signing of the Treaty of Betrawati in 1792 B.S.

A later conflict, the Nepalese–Tibetan War (1855–1856), resulted in a Nepalese victory and the signing of the Treaty of Thapathali, which granted Nepal financial indemnities and trade privileges.

By the early 19th century, the Gorkha dominion stretched from Kumaon and Garhwal in the west to Sikkim in the east. However, after their defeat in the Anglo-Nepalese War (1814–1816), the Gorkhalis were forced to sign the Treaty of Sugauli, ceding large territories to the British East India Company and reducing the kingdom to its current borders.

== Transition ==
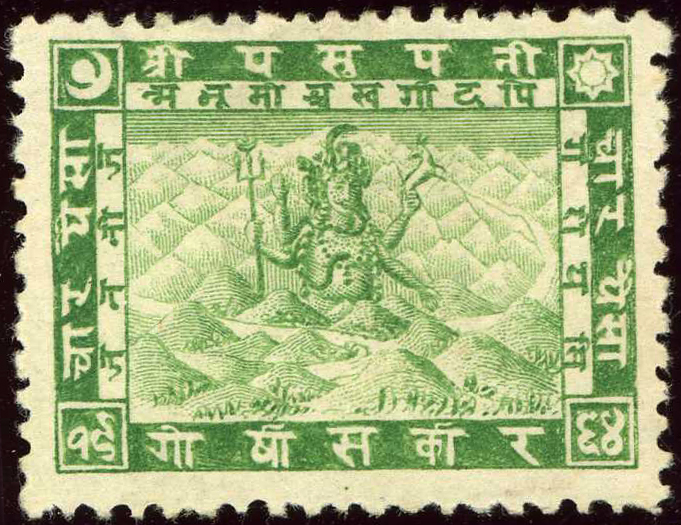
Postage stamp issued by Gorkha government in 1907

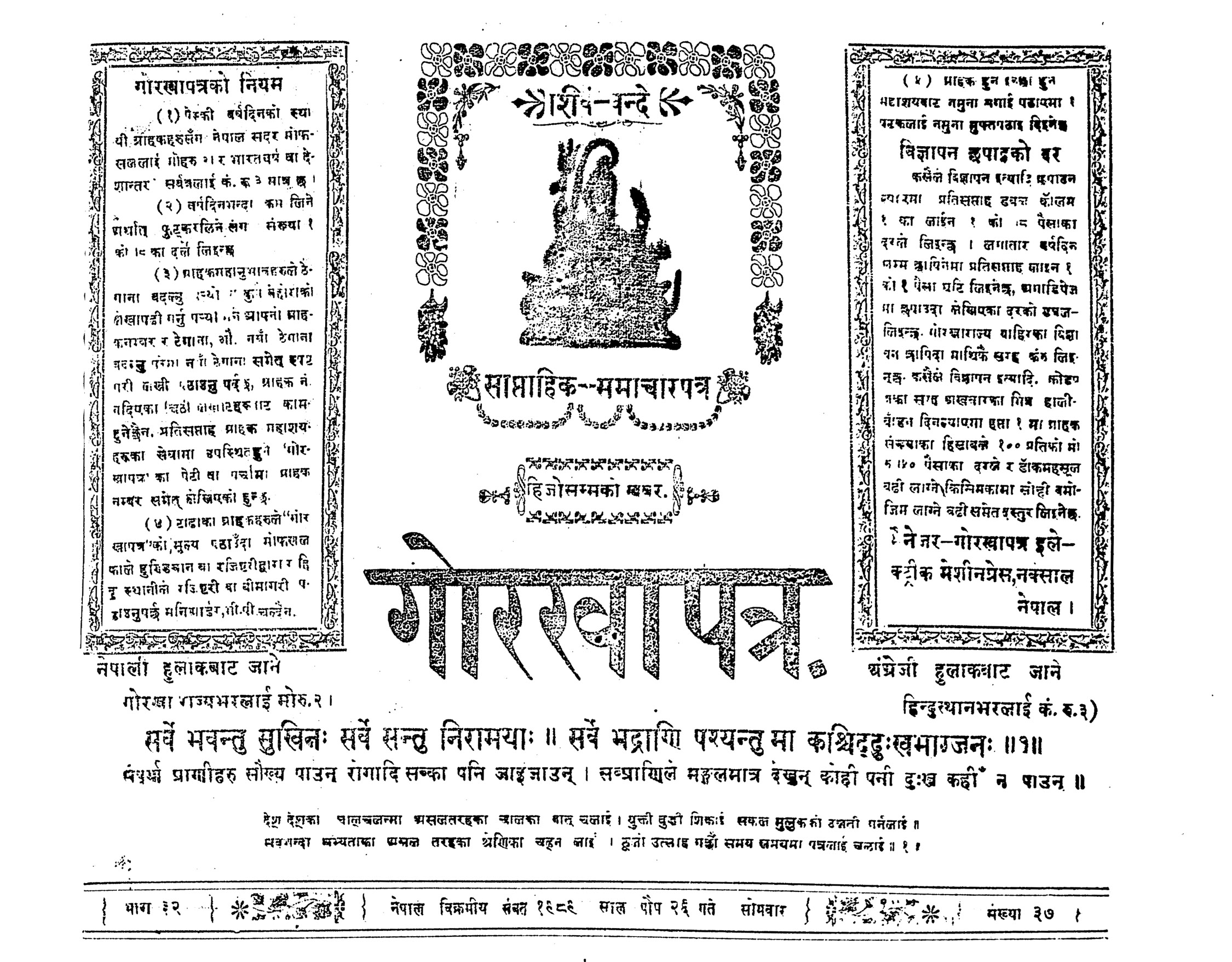
Gorkhapatra dated January 9, 1933

The Gorkha dominion continued to be known as "Gorkha Rajya" (lit. 'Gorkha kingdom') as well as Asal Hindustan until the beginning of the 20th century. Historically, the name 'Nepal' referred mainly to Kathmandu valley, the homeland of the Newars. Since the 1930s, the state began using it to refer to the entire country and 'Nepal Khaldo' (Nepal Valley) became 'Kathmandu Valley'. The name Gorkha Sarkar (meaning Gorkha government) was also changed to Nepal government.

Similarly, the Gorkhali language was renamed as Nepali in 1933. The term Gorkhali in the former national anthem entitled "Shreeman Gambhir" was changed to Nepali in 1951. The government newspaper, launched in 1901, is still known as Gorkhapatra (meaning Gorkha gazette).

The Shah dynasty ruled Nepal until 2008 when it became a republic following a people's movement. Current Gorkha District and Dhading District (across the Trishuli River) are roughly similar to the territory of the former Gorkha Kingdom.

== Government and administration ==
The Gorkha Kingdom was governed as a hereditary monarchy under the Shah dynasty. The king exercised central authority, while military commanders, nobles and local officials played important roles in the administration of the kingdom. The central government included the king, a Chautariya, Kajis, Sardars, secretaries, a chamberlain and a treasurer.

During the reign of Prithvi Narayan Shah, the military and administrative institutions of Gorkha were organized to support the kingdom's expansion. The leading families of Gorkha played an important role in both government and the military, while loyalty to the king and the army formed important elements of the Gorkhali state.

The expansion of the kingdom brought different principalities and communities under Gorkhali rule. In newly conquered territories, the Gorkhali administration often relied on existing local administrative structures and adapted them to local conditions.

== Military ==
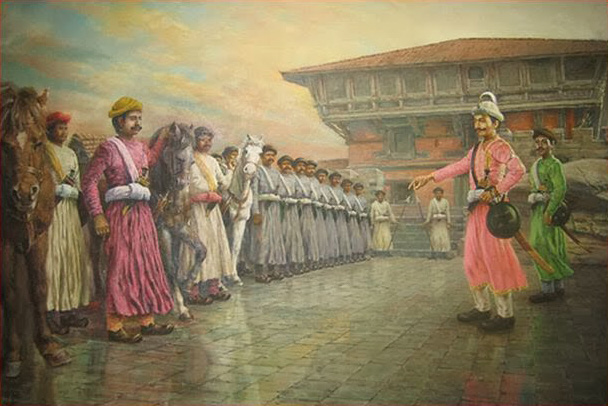
Gorkhali troops preparing war against Kathmandu Valley.

The military apparatus of the Gorkha Kingdom, historically known as the Gorkhali Army (later Nepali Army), was central to the state's survival, territorial expansion, and the eventual unification of Nepal. Originating as a small hill militia under Dravya Shah in 1559 CE, it evolved by the 1768 CE into a disciplined standing army, it relied heavily on high-altitude mountain guerrilla warfare, strategic blockades, and hill fortification defense. ehe high command was consisted of the Kajis, Sardars, Subedar, Jamadar. Infantry recruitment drew broadly from the Khas, Magar, and Gurung hill communities.

Influenced by European military structures, Prithvi Narayan Shah organized the Gorkhali forces into permanent standing companies known as Gulma or Paltan.

=== Gorkhali Units ===
The following is a list of the early standing companies (gulmas) formed during the expansion and unification era of the Gorkha Kingdom, before the establishment of the Kingdom of Nepal in 1768.

No.	Name	Flag	Formation Year (CE)	Role and Historical Significance
1	Shree Shreenath		1762	
2	Shree Barda Bahadur		1762	
3	Shree Kali Baksh		1762	
4	Shree Sabuj		1762	
5	Shree Purano Gorakh		1763	

== List of monarchs ==
The following is a list of Shah monarchs who ruled the Gorkha Kingdom before the establishment of the Kingdom of Nepal in 1768.

No.	Ruler	Depliction	Reign (CE)
1	Dravya Shah		1559–1570
2	Purna Shah		1570–1605
3	Chatra Shah		1605–1609
4	Ram Shah		1609–1633
5	Dambar Shah		1633–1645
6	Krishna Shah		1645–1661
7	Rudra Shah		1661–1673
8	Prithvipati Shah		1673–1716
9	Nara Bhupal Shah		1716–1743
10	Prithvi Narayan Shah		1743–1768

== Society and culture ==
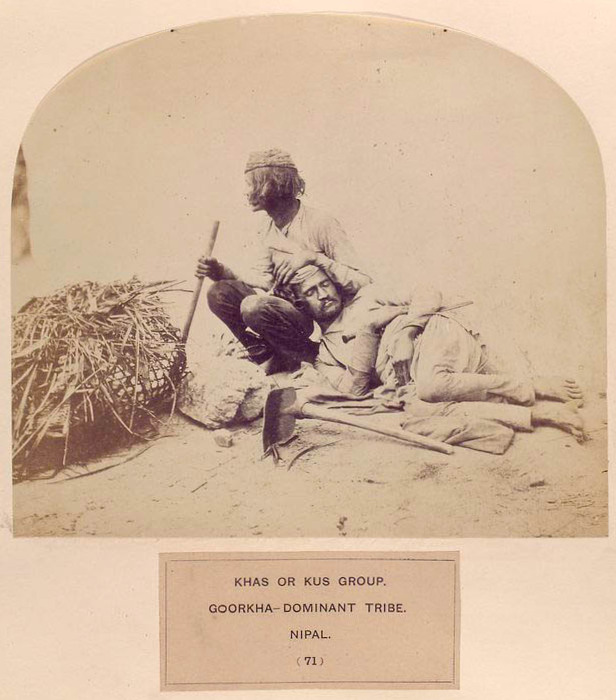
Gorkha-dominant men from Khas community.

The society of the Gorkha Kingdom was multi-ethnic, multi-caste, predominantly rural, structured around agrarian mountain livelihood, traditional martial culture, and syncretic religious traditions.

== Legacy ==
=== Gurkhas ===
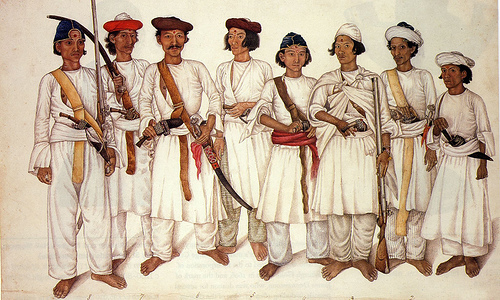

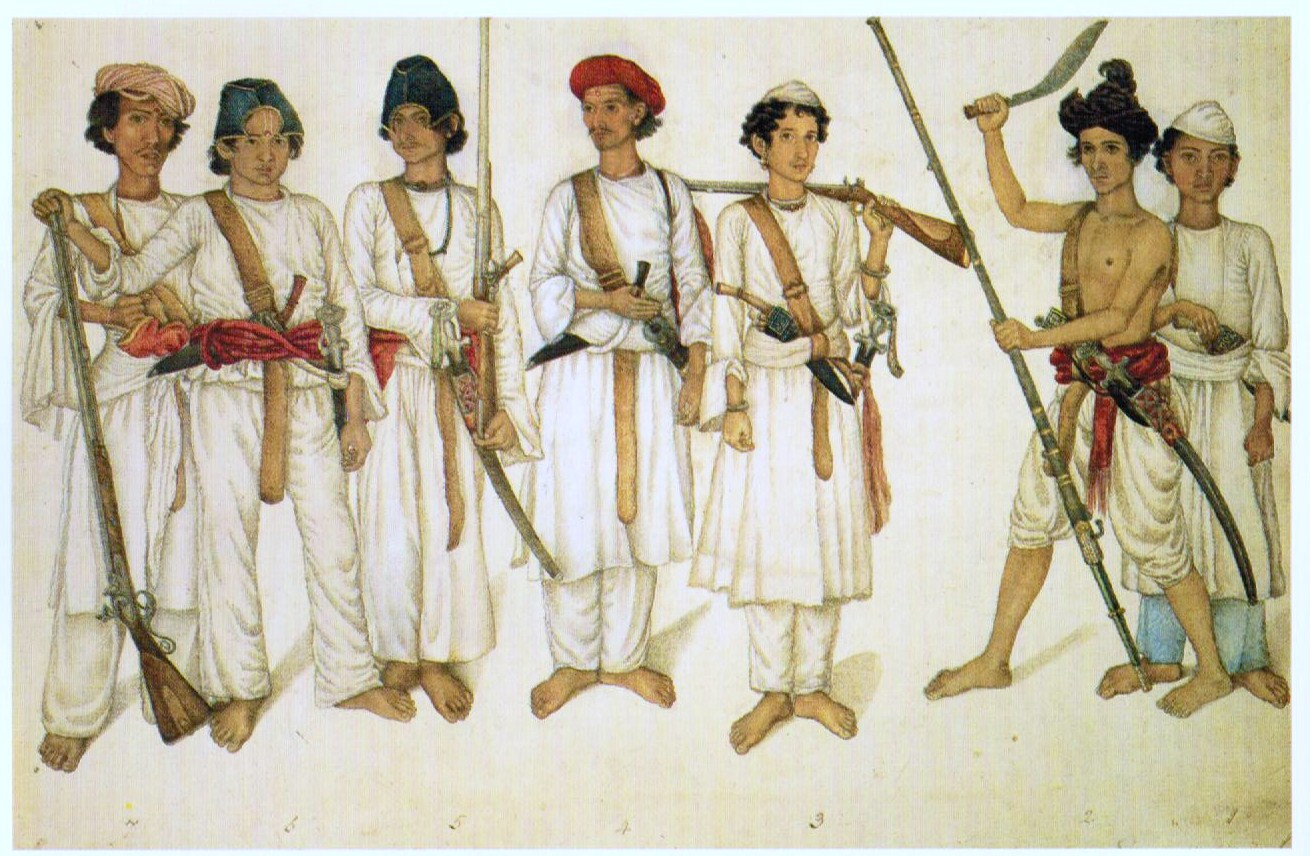
Gorkhali soldiers, 1815

The Gurkhas are soldiers originally from Gorkha kingdom (later Kingdom of Nepal and now Nepal), who have served in the armies of the United Kingdom and India. British recruitment of Gurkha soldiers began during the Anglo-Nepalese War (1814–1816), when British forces encountered Gurkha troops serving the Kingdom of Nepal. Impressed by their military abilities, the British East India Company began recruiting Gurkhas during and after the war.

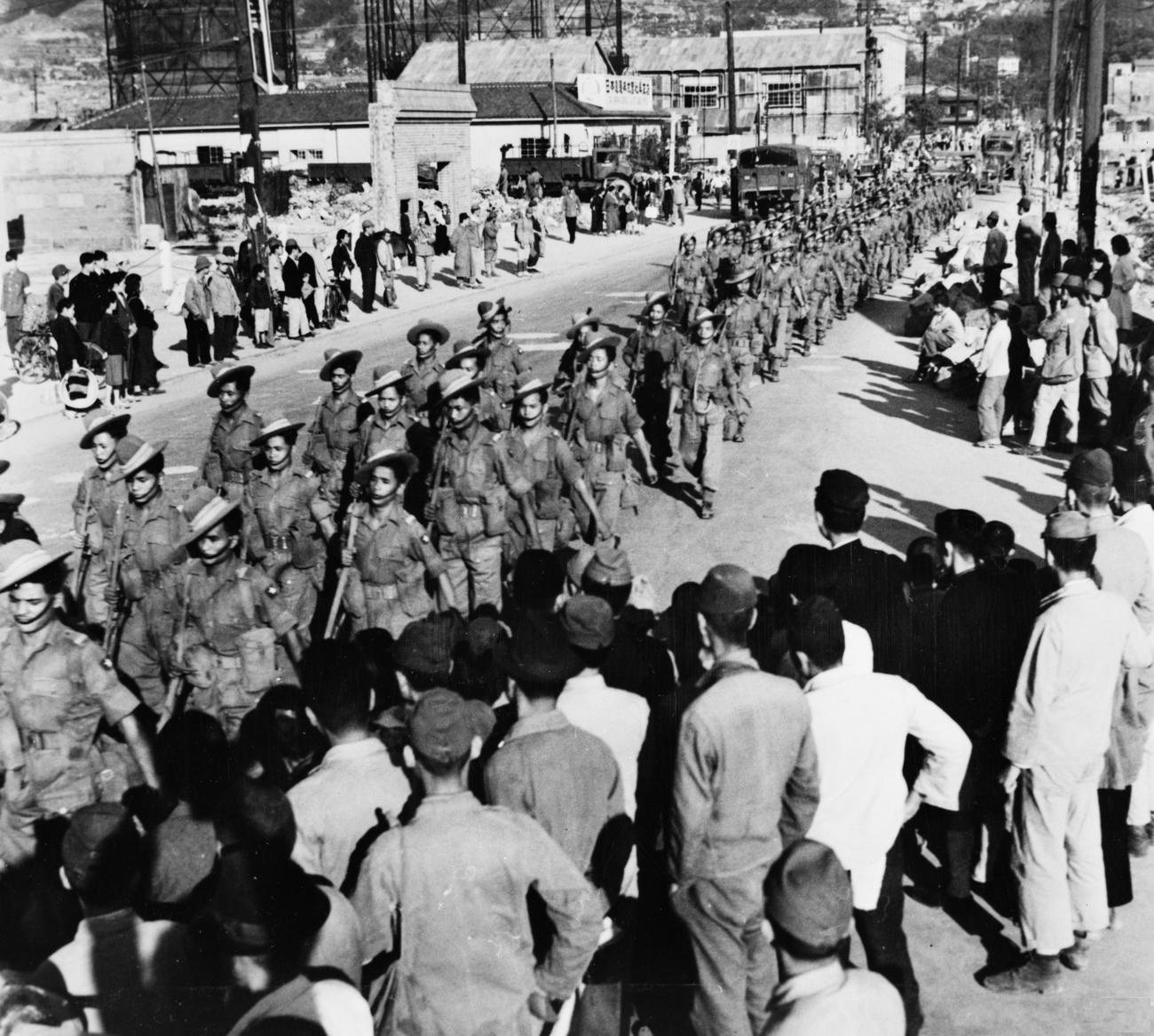
Gurkha soldiers arriving in Japan in 1946 as part of the Allied occupation forces

Gurkha recruitment has historically included soldiers from several ethnic groups and communities in Nepal, including the Gurung, Magar, Rai, Limbu, Tamang and Khas communities. The Gurkha regiments became part of the British Indian Army and later continued in the British Army and Indian Army after the independence of India in 1947. In 1948, four Gurkha regiments were transferred to the British Army, while six were allocated to the Indian Army.

During the First World War, around 100,000 Gurkhas served in the British Indian Army. Gurkha battalions fought on the Western Front and in Mesopotamia, Persia, Palestine and Gallipoli. They received hundreds of gallantry awards and suffered more than 20,000 casualties.

During the Second World War, more than 110,000 Gurkhas served in 40 battalions in theatres including the Western Desert campaign, Italy, Greece, Malaya, Singapore and Burma. Nearly 30,000 were killed or wounded during the war. Gurkha units received numerous decorations for gallantry during the conflict and continued to serve in the British and Indian armies after the war.

Gurkha soldiers have received some of the highest military decorations for bravery. Kulbir Thapa became the first Gurkha recipient of the Victoria Cross during the First World War, after rescuing wounded soldiers while under enemy fire during the Battle of Loos. In total, 13 Gurkha soldiers have been awarded the Victoria Cross.

Gurkhas have continued to serve in British military operations after the Second World War, including in the Falklands War, Kosovo, Bosnia and Herzegovina, Sierra Leone, Afghanistan and Iraq. In 2010, Dipprasad Pun, a soldier of the Royal Gurkha Rifles, was awarded the Conspicuous Gallantry Cross for his actions while defending a position against an attack in Helmand Province, Afghanistan.

Following Indian independence, the British Gurkha units became part of the Brigade of Gurkhas within the British Army. The Brigade continues to recruit in Nepal and remains a distinctive part of the British Army.

== Gallery ==
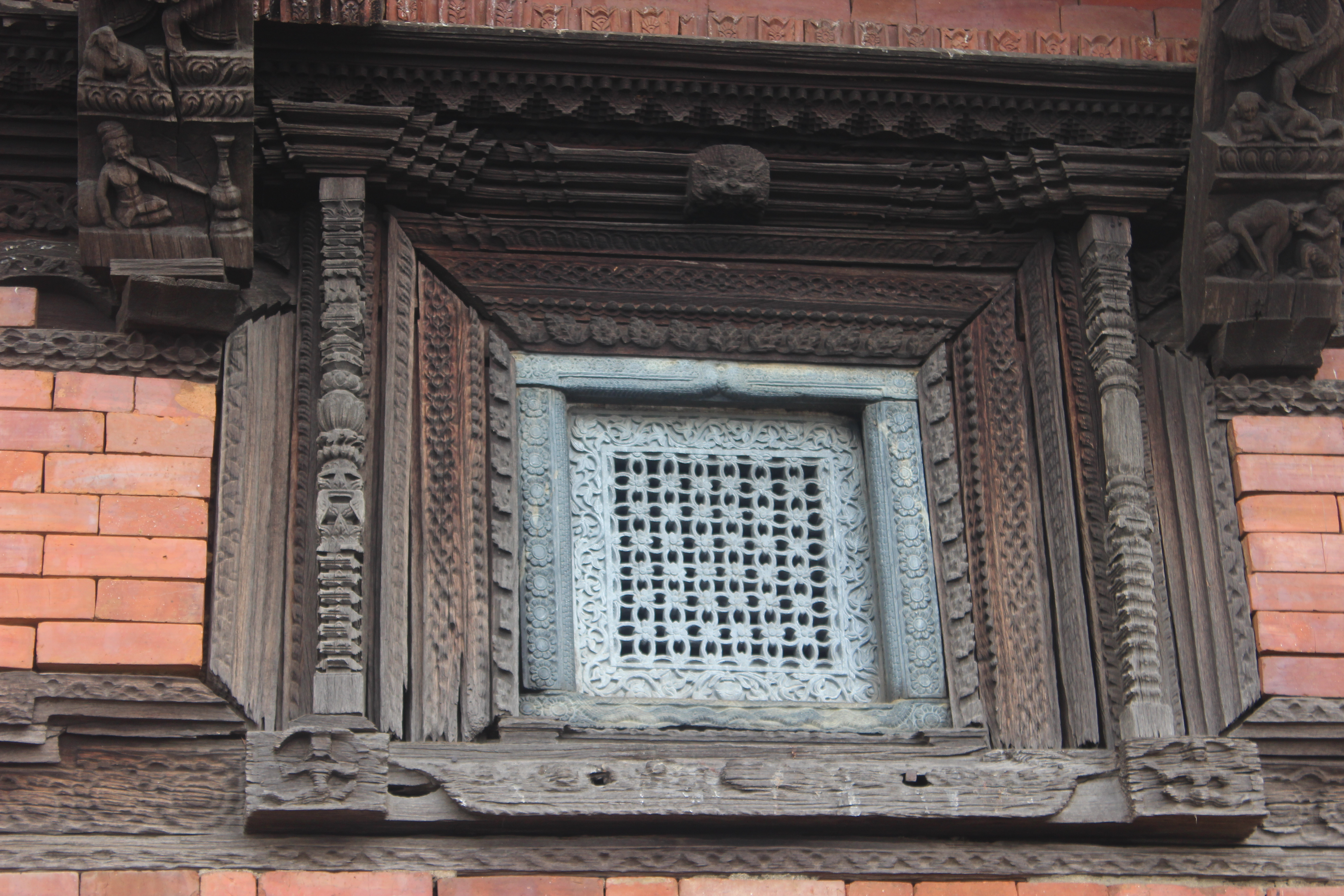
Metal window

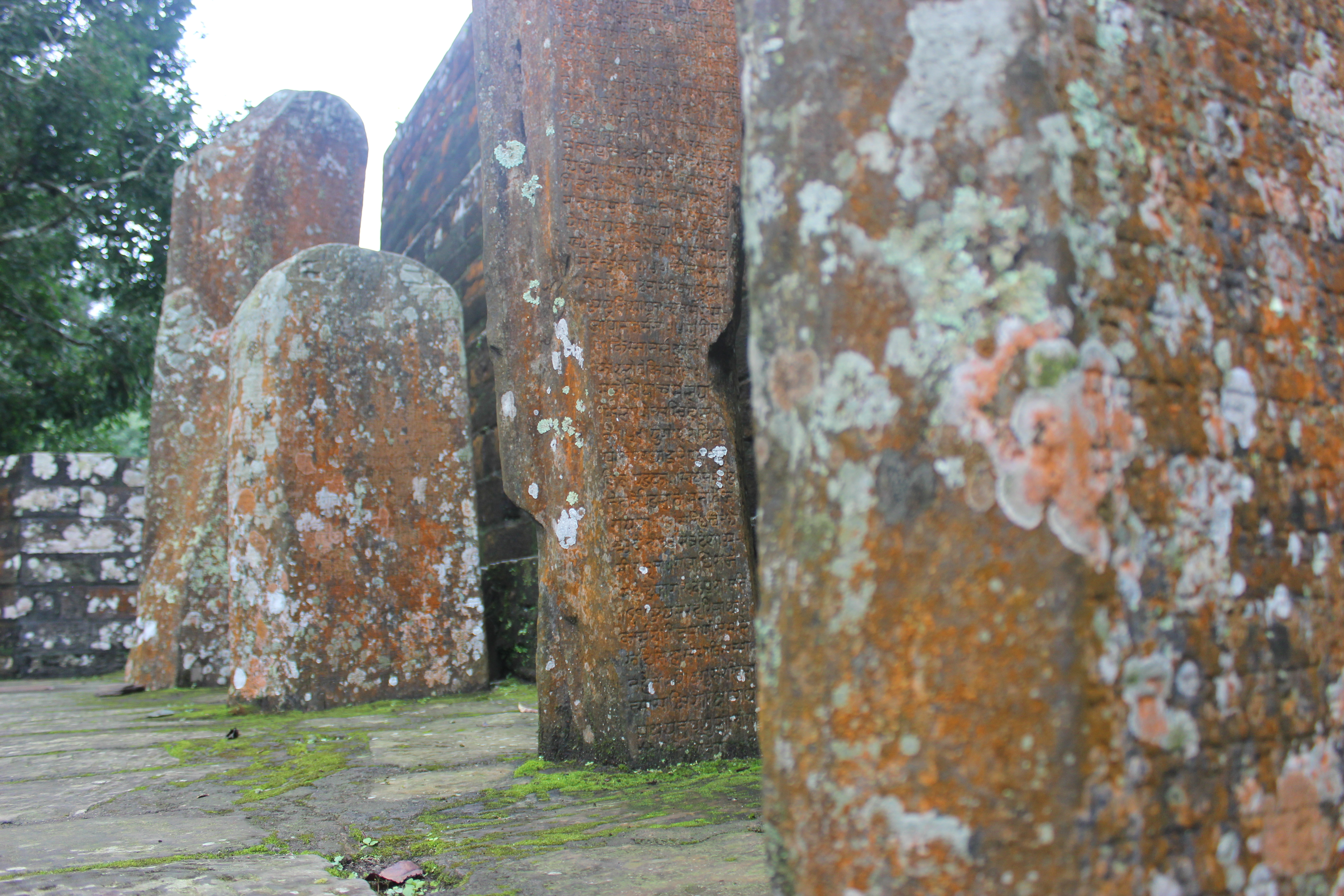
Stone history

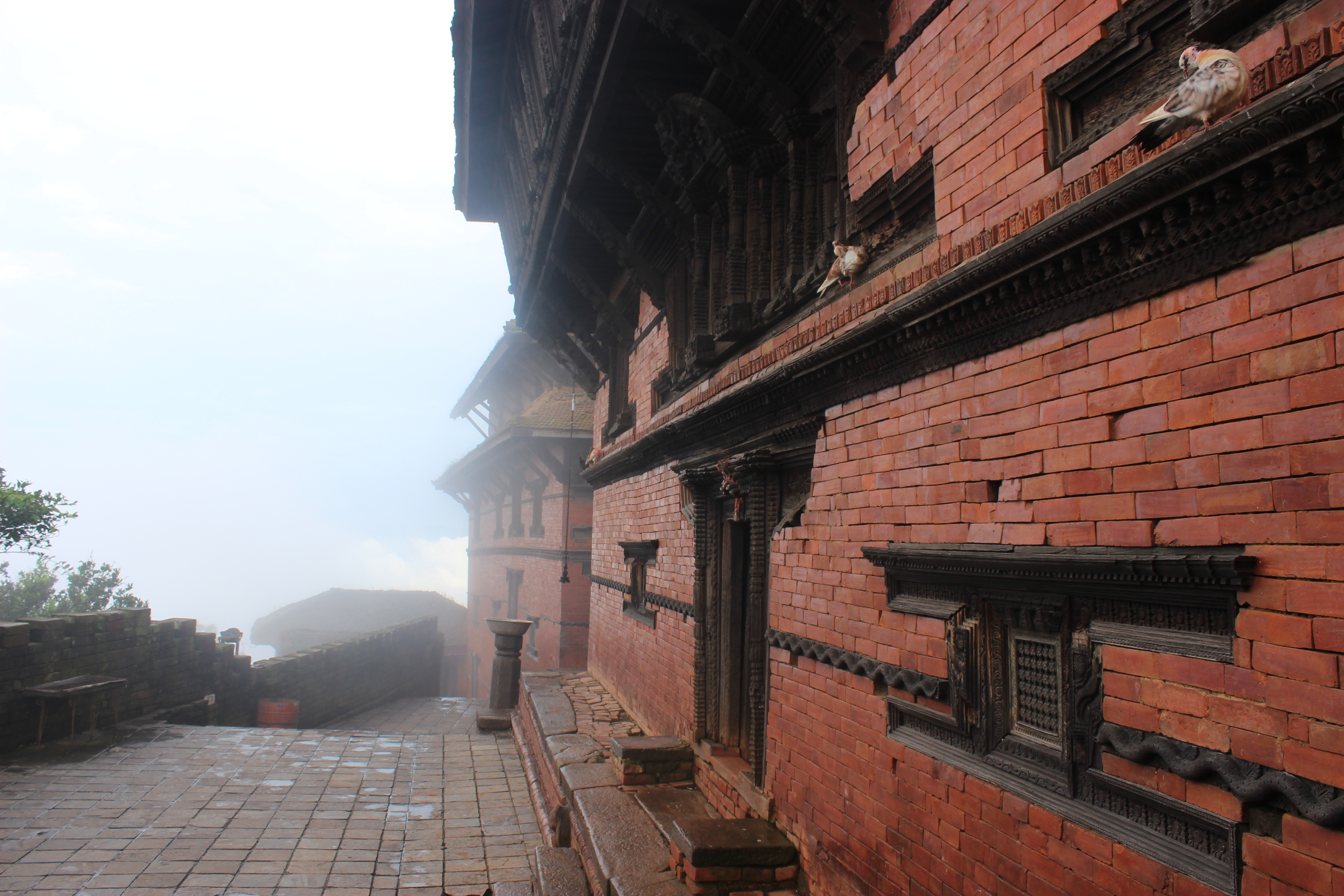
Gorkha Durbar

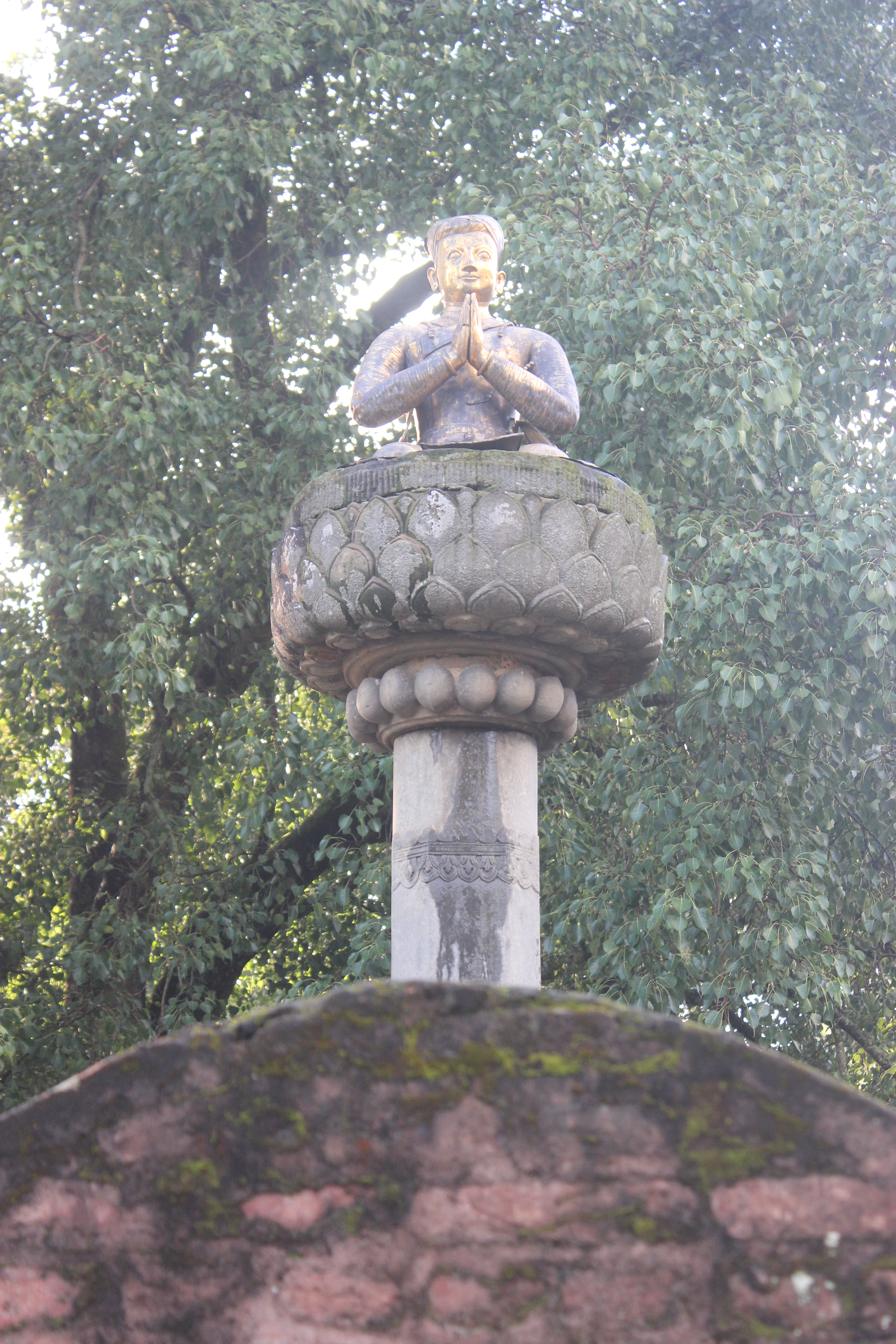
King Prithavi Pati

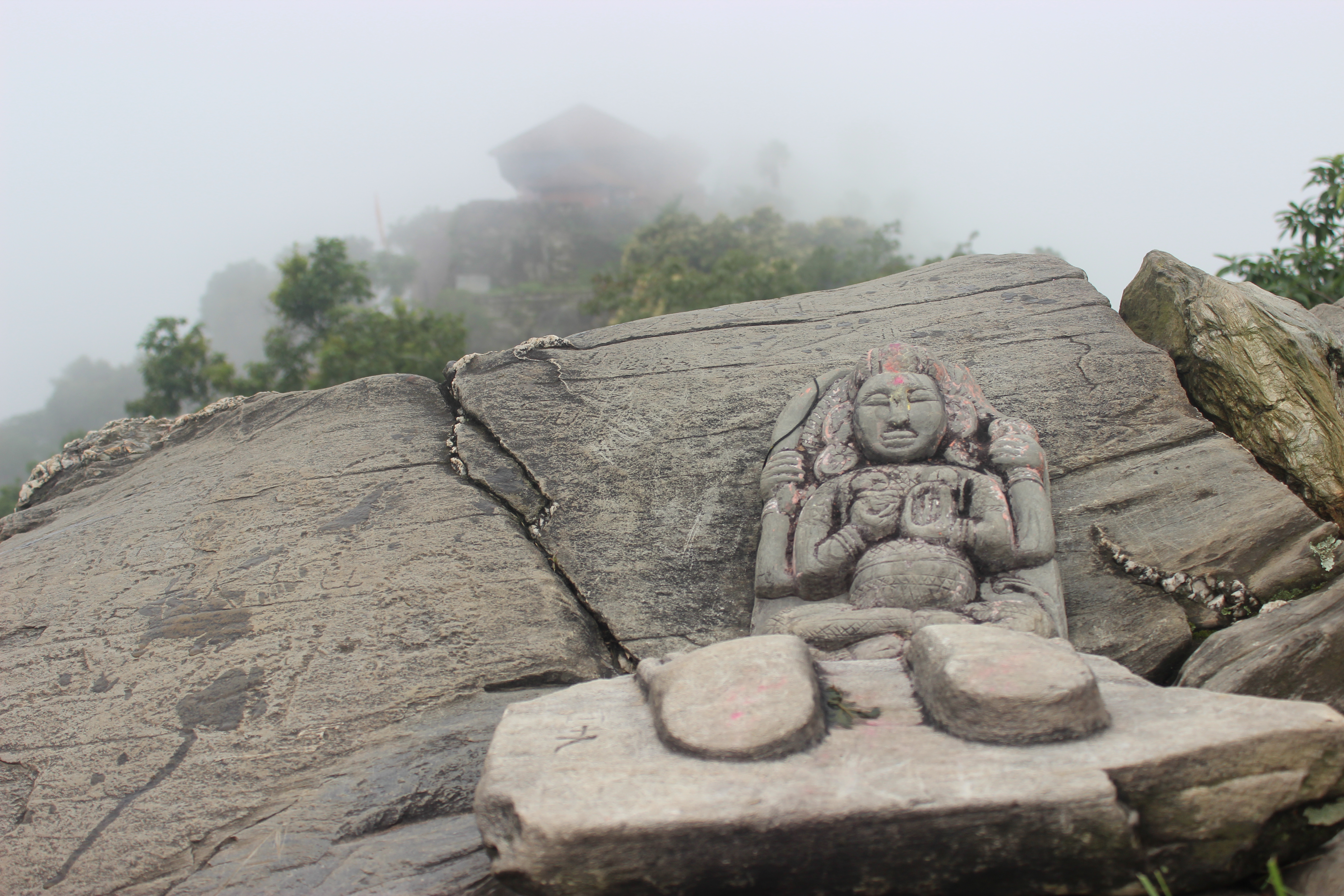
Image of goddess & Gorkha Palace

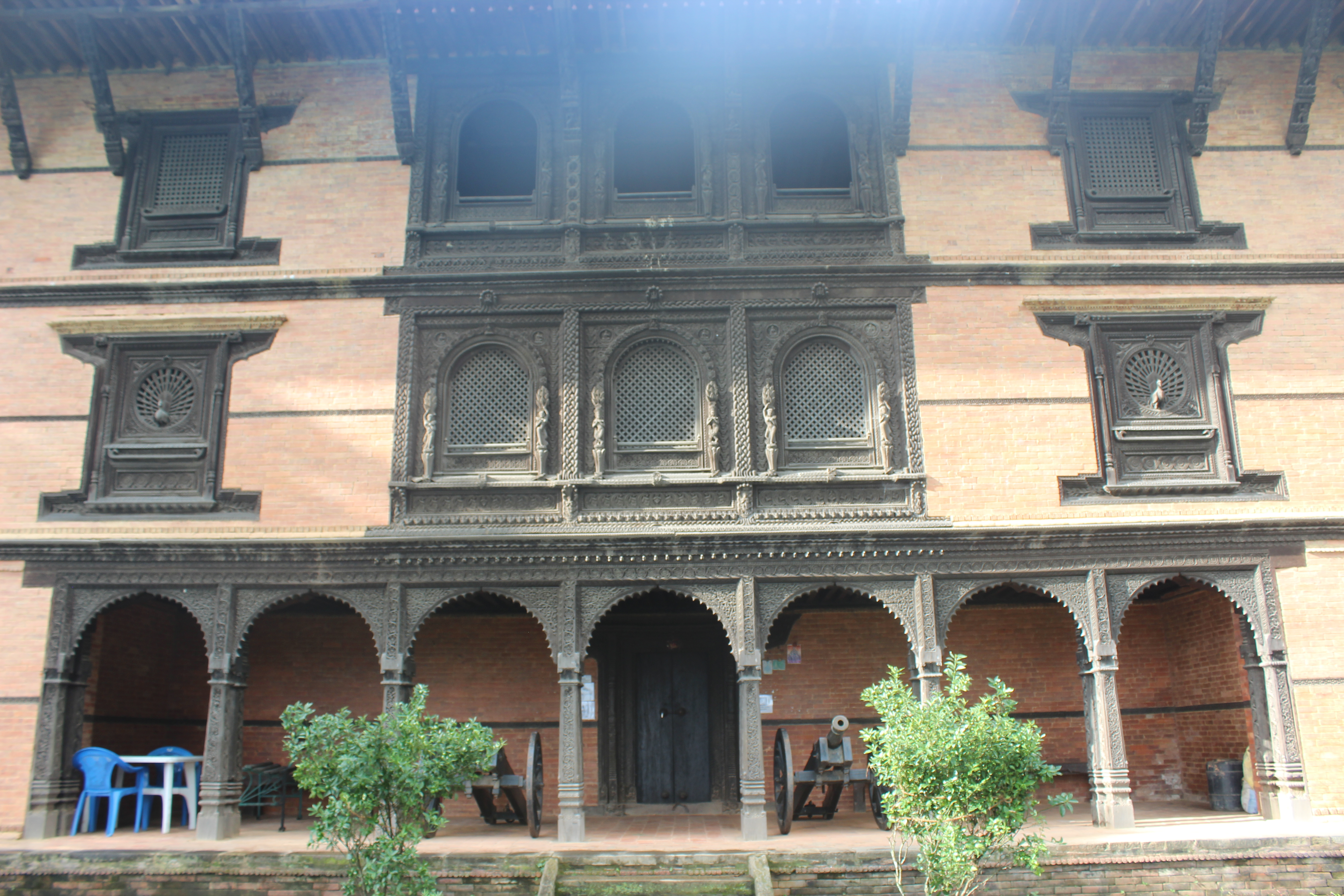
Gorkha Tallo Durbar

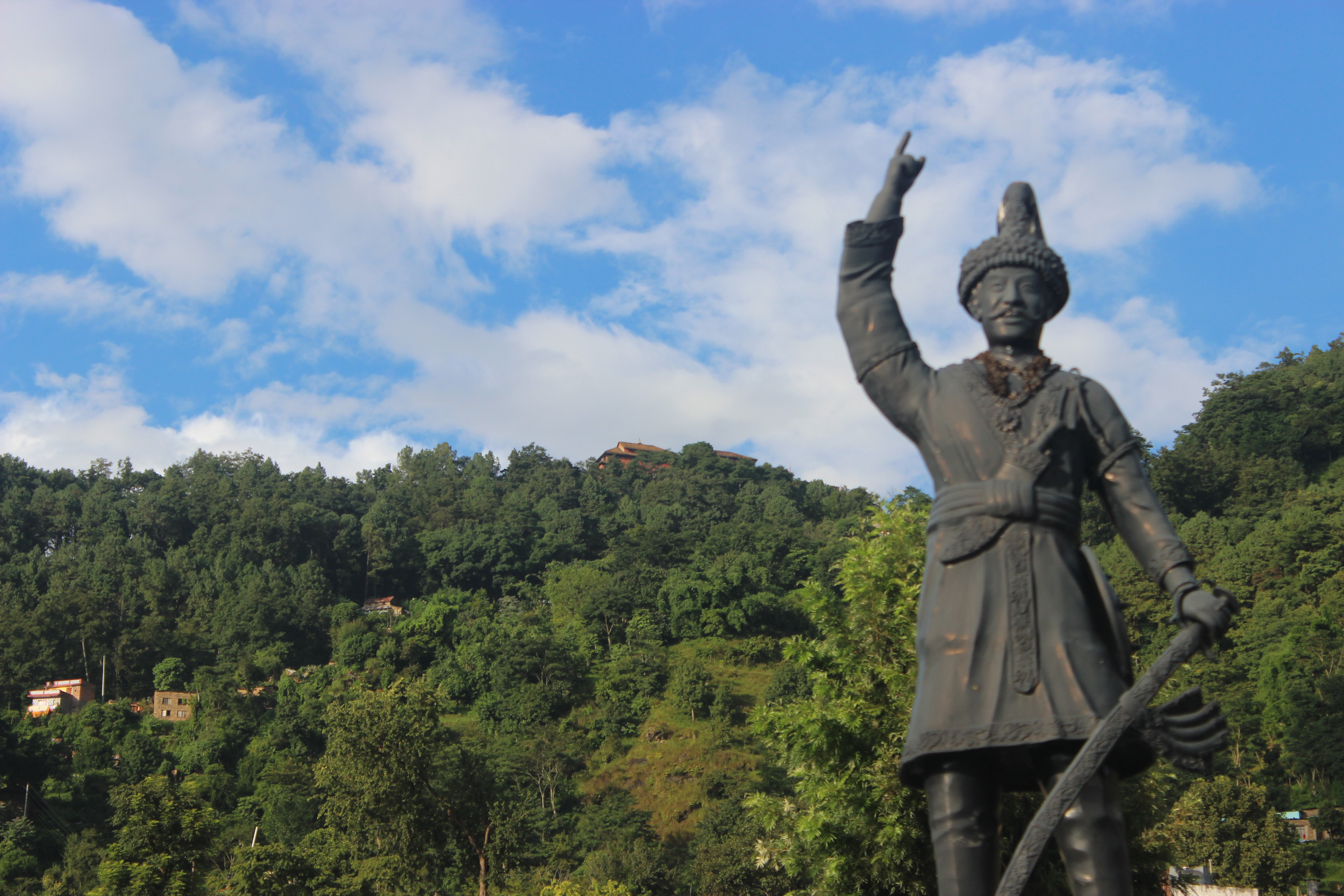
Shree Panch Bada Maharajadhiraj Prithavi Narayan Shah Dev

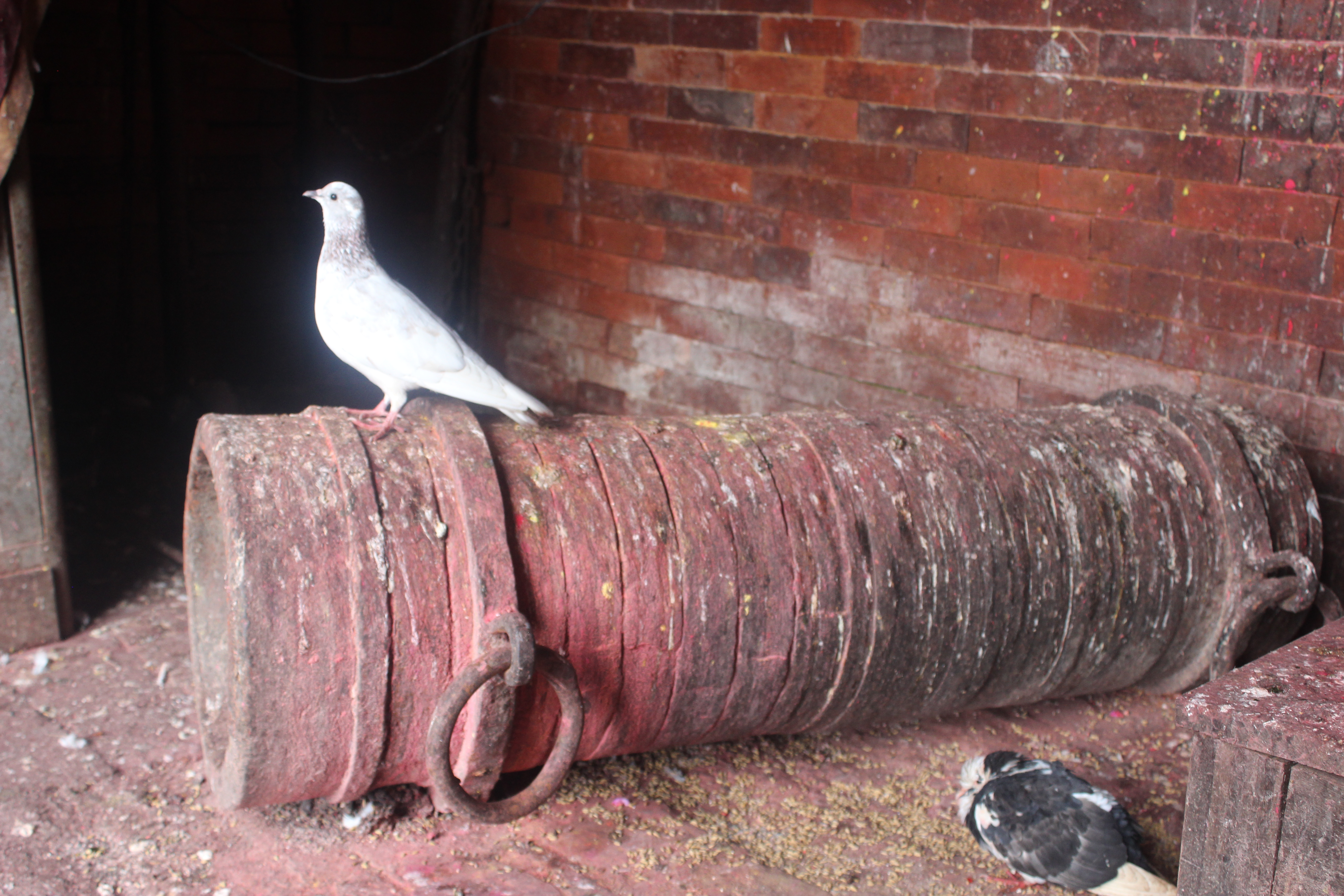
Nepali cannon

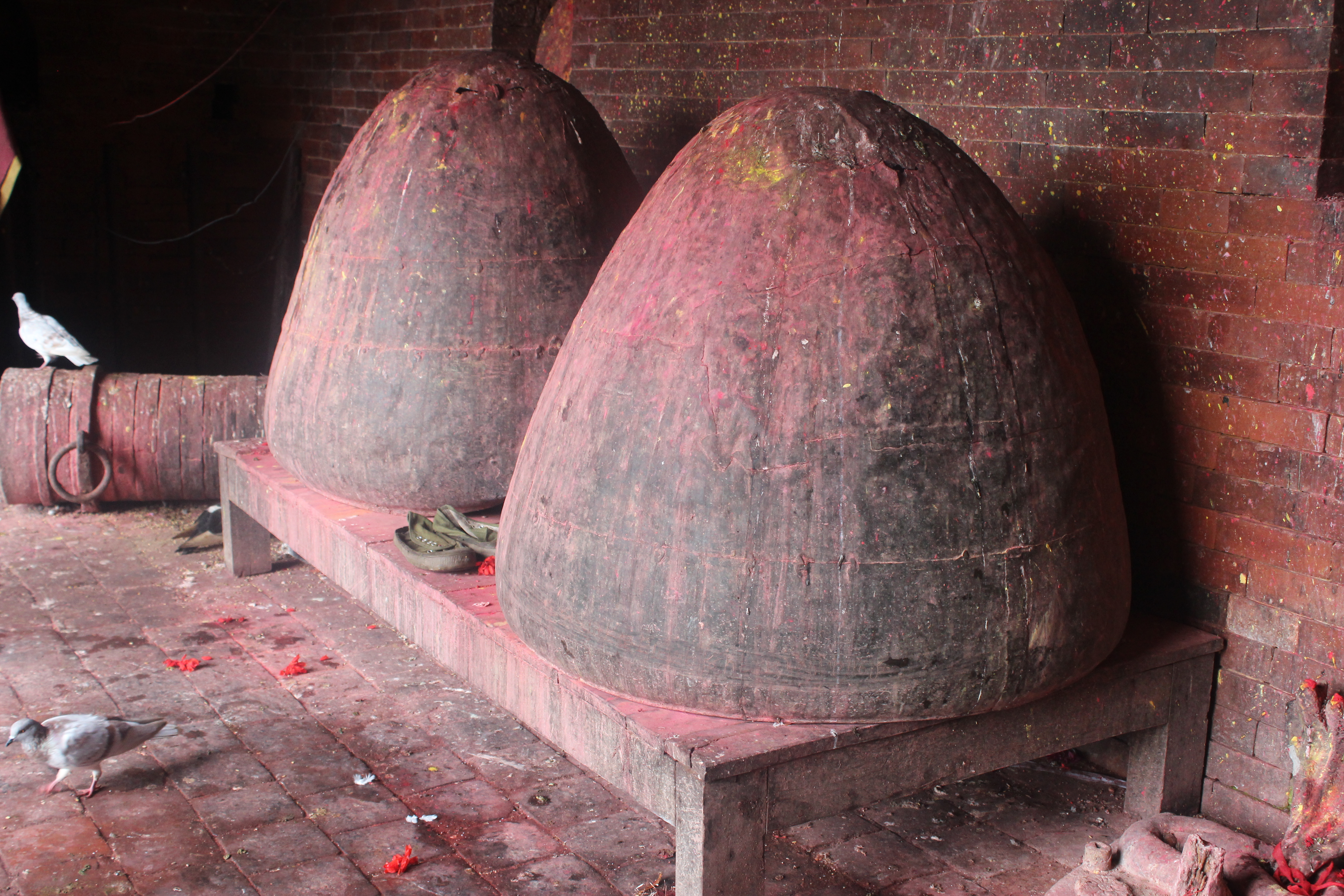
Nagada

== See also ==
- Gurkha
- Battle of Kathmandu
- Kingdom of Nepal
- List of Hindu empires and dynasties
- Shah dynasty
- Rana dynasty
