= Liglig =

Hill top in Gorkha, Nepal

- लिगलिगकोट
- Palungtar Municipality,
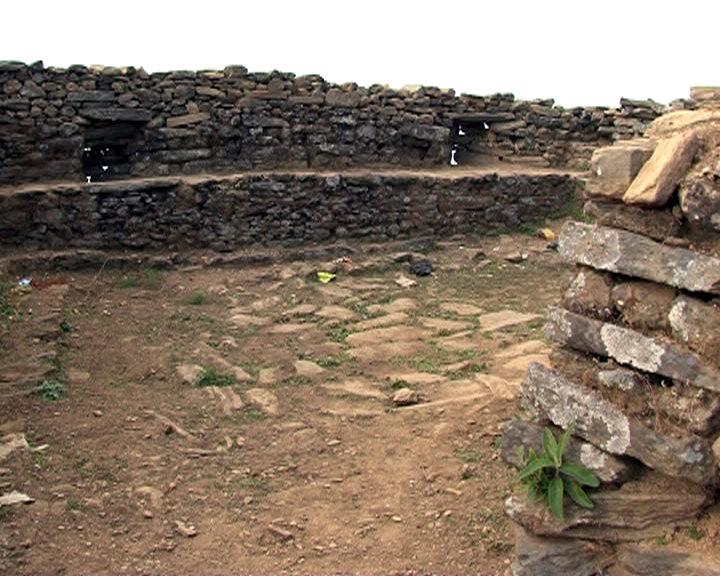

Site information
- Condition: Ruin

Location
- Location within Nepal
- Coordinates: 28.0622°N 84.526°E

Site history
- Materials: stone
- Events: Liglig Marathon Liglig Cycle Race

Liglig, better known as "ligligkot" is a hill top located in Palungtar Municipality of Gorkha, Nepal. It is located at the height of 1437 meters (4790 feet) mean sea level. Gorkha District has a long and intriguing history. It's where a Royal Shah Dynasty got its start and the famous Gurkha soldiers got their name. Located 80 kilometers (50 mi) due west of Kathmandu (140 kilometers by road). It is the place where the former monarchy of Nepal was established.

Drabya Shah, then brother of King Narahari Shah of neighboring Lamjung District established the small kingdom at around 1616 BS /(1559 AD). Still the remaining stones of the ancient palace could be seen in the hill top at Ligligkot.

== Origin of Word Liglig ==
There have been different opinions regarding the origin of the word "Liglig". However, it is assumed that it came from the word "lingling" from Magar language meaning clear, pristine, beautiful view. It seems plausible as it fell on the Magars Kingdom then, and Magar language was the predominant in that part of the region. Later, after the victory of Shah kings, the Nepali language (Khas Kura) took over the prevalent Magar language in Liglig, Gorkha.

== History of Liglig kingdom ==
In Ligligkot it was decided that whoever won the race from Chepeghat to the Ligligkot top will be the king for next year (however some historians deny it and say that the start point was from Chorkate the other side of the Chepeghat).

Dalsur Ghale Magar was king of Ligligkot. Ghale Magar is a member of the Thapa Magar clan's subdivisions. The word ‘Ghale’ refers to the Head of state or community given by Shah dynasty. The race would be organized every Dashain Tika day. Only the local Magars participated, and among them, the Thapa clan consistently dominated and won the race for many years. During one of the annual races, Gangaram Rana Magar, became unhappy after losing. He moved to Lamjung, where his close friends lived, and later he allied with Drabya Shah, the brother of King Nara Bhupal Shah of Lamjung. Knowing the routes and terrain of Ligligkot, Gangaram Rana guided the Lamjung forces and attacked the area in 1616 BS and killed the Magar King. Since then, the Shah dynasty was established in the Ligligkot kingdom and his descendants established the Gorkha Kingdom and one of the Shah descendant Prithvi Narayan Shah established Nepal winning small kingdoms scattered around the Gorkha district. There have been different stories regarding the history of Liglig kingdom. The widely accepted notion states that after the death of Yakshya Malla, the Gorkha kingdom was under Palpa's King Mukunda Sen. After the demise of King Mukunda Sen their sons couldn't control their big kingdom resulting the small kingdoms in Gorkha with the respective administrators being the kings.

== Battle of the LigLig Fort ==
Drabya Shah, the youngest son of Yashobrahma Shah, king of Lamjung, became the king after capturing Liglig fort with much tactfulness on Vijaya Dashami 1616 B.S. (1559 A.D.) having marched from Lamjung. At that time Uppallokot (fort in the upper part) area and Tallokot (fort in the lower part) area of Gorkha were ruled by King Mansingh Khadka Magar and King Dalsur Ghale Magar. Khadka Magar is a member of the Rana Magars clan's subdivisions and Ghale Magar is a member of the Thapa Magars clan's subdivisions. Thus the areas with two tribal chiefs after the conquest by Drabya Shah was called Gorkha. The battle of Liglig is of much importance in the Gorkha Kingdom, nomenclature of Gorkha and in the formation of the modern Nepal. King Drabya Shah was the founder of Gorkha Kingdom. It is also believed that Drabya Shah with the help of his friends secretly killed the local who were ahead of him and thus secured first position in the race.

His descendants expanded the tiny kingdom to Gorkha and one of his great-grandson Prithvi Narayan Shah unified the Nepal as present Nepal.

Drabya Shah also conquered Dhading and other places. But it was one of his descendants who, two centuries later, went on to fully unify the Kingdom of Nepal. The ultimate unifier was Prithvi Narayan Shah who, from his base in the Gorkha hills, succeeded in putting the Shah dynasty in the history of Nepal by subduing Newar kings of Kathmandu Valley and making Kathmandu his capital. The year was 1769 AD.

== Liglig's Amppipal Hospital ==
A half century ago, the residents of Liglig and surrounding villages and hamlets were first introduced to modern agriculture, education and health development. In the late 1950s, several Western missionaries showed on the eastern flanks of Liglig mountain at a tiny ridge-top village called Amppipal (named for two trees: "Amp" or mango and "pipal", a type of fig). They came to see what they could do to help the locals improve their lives. In one of his books, Dr Thomas Hale describes how the first missionaries asked the people of Amppipal what they needed. They said “health, education and better agriculture”. So the missionaries started a community development project to help meet those felt needs.

First, a demonstration farm was established to introduce the locals to new crops and farming methods, and improved and more productive breeds of livestock. Over time, village water systems were upgraded, reforestation projects were begun and agricultural extension works were taken up in the villages. Two schools were opened, one on the ridge at Amppipal and another nearby at Luitel on the south slopes of Liglig mountain. And a small health dispensary was set up near the mission farm. Soon, however, the demand for health services had so outgrown the tiny health post that the missionaries began building a real hospital about 15 minutes’ walk down the north side of Liglig mountain. It opened in late 1969 AD and ran for many years under the leadership of Dr Helen Huston, a dedicated and greatly admired Canadian medical missionary.

For half a century, missionary doctors, nurses, teachers and agriculture workers came from Europe, North America, India and Australia to work at Amppipal, Luitel and the vicinity. They were highly committed and hard-working folk who provided great services to the local people. They learned to speak Nepali, and their dedication and skills led to many changes and improvements in the lives of the villagers amongst whom they lived.

During the 1990s, however, political unrest across Nepal created difficulties at Aanppipal, and the missionaries opted to leave. In 2001, Amppipal Hospital was handed over to the Nepal government. Today, eight years on, it functions as a community hospital with some government help, along with Gorkha Foundation assistance. Dr Wolfhard Starke, a retired surgeon from Germany, serves as a volunteer doctor. He is assisted by a dozen Nepali nurses, an administrative officer and other staff.

Similarly, the former mission schools and many new ones around the mountain fall under the auspices of the government's District Education Office. They, too, receive assistance from the Nepal government, the Gorkha Foundation and a few other private organizations.

The origional demonstration farm at Amppipal is gone, while the schools and hospital have continued to function. There is now a road to the hospital, and on over Amppipal bhanjhyang (where the trail crosses the ridge), and another leads to the villages of Luitel, Liglig and the viscinity. The roads are used by tractors and trucks to move people and haul supplies, and to send produce to market.
