= Sita cave =

Cave in Nepal

Sita cave (सीता गुफा) is located at Sulikot Gaupalika, Swara in Gorkha district of Nepal at the elevation of 1165 m above the sea level. It spreads from Surpani, Auawang, Aruchanaute to Arughat. The cave is about 2 feet wide and 40 feet high. The total length is unknown due to inaccessibility, but is believed to be longest in Nepal.

Historically, Gurung priests used to meditate in this cave. There are pictographs in the surface of the cave walls depicting cows, bees and tigers. The cave is an important attraction for Hindus and tourists. A festival is celebrated near the cave on the day of Ramnavami.
