= Kingdom of Kaski =

Former kingdom located in present-day Nepal

Kingdom of Kaski Nepali: कास्की
- Government: Monarchy
- Historical era: Chaubisi Rajyas
Succeeded by
Kingdom of Nepal
- Today part of: Nepal

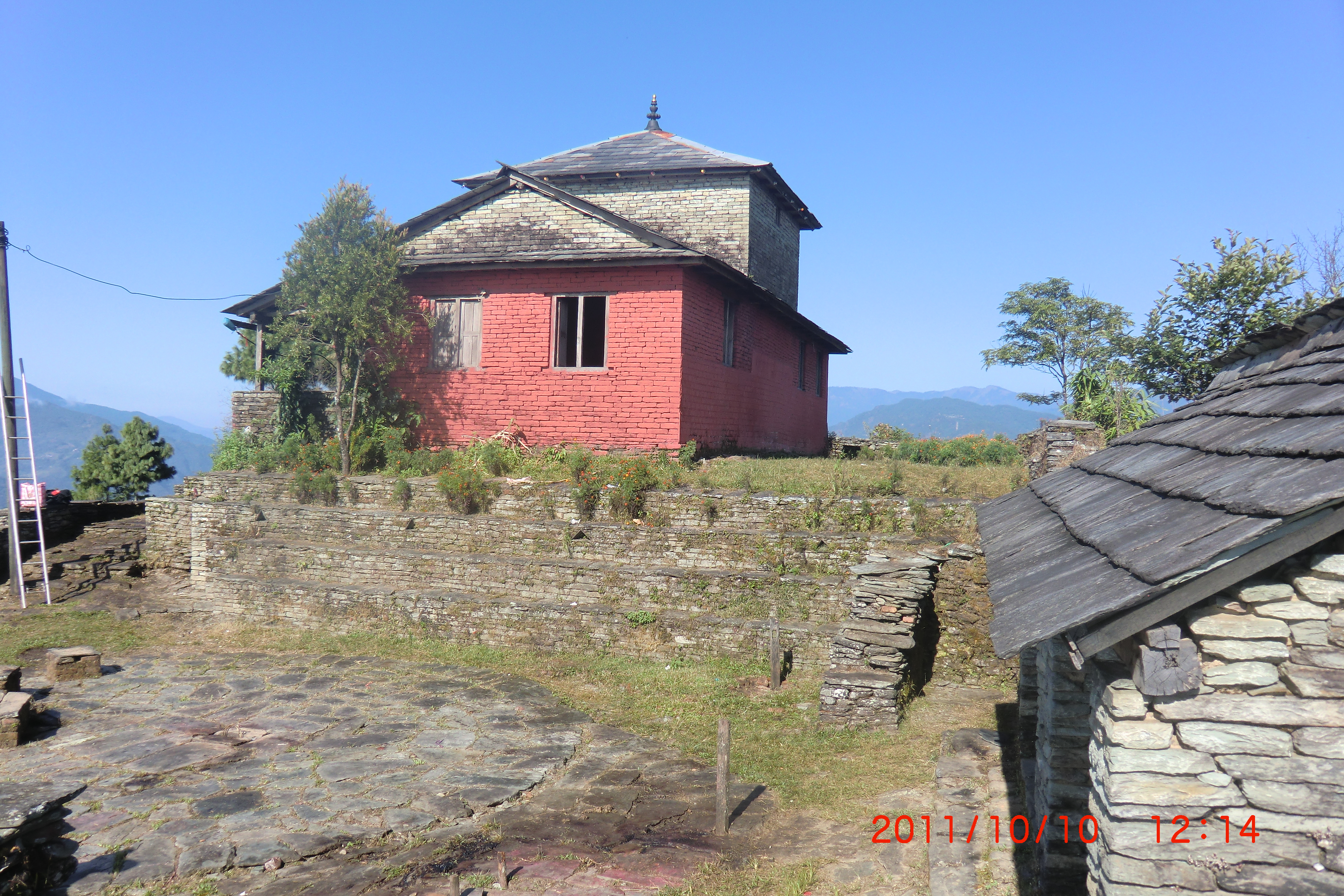
Ancient palace in Kaskikot built during King Kulmandan Shah’s era.

The Kingdom of Kaski (Nepali: कास्की राज्य) was a petty kingdom in the confederation of 24 states known as Chaubisi Rajya. Kaski was annexed to the Kingdom of Nepal during the Unification of Nepal.
