= Kingdom of Lamjung =

Former kingdom located in present-day Nepal

Kingdom of Lamjung Nepali: लमजुङ
- Government: Monarchy
- Historical era: Chaubisi Rajyas
Succeeded by
Kingdom of Nepal
- Today part of: Nepal

The Kingdom of Lamjung (Nepali: लमजुङ राज्य) was a petty kingdom in the confederation of 24 states known as Chaubisi Rajya. King of Lamjung, Narahari Shah's young brother Dravya Shah went on to establish the Gorkha Kingdom which later became present-day Nepal.
