= Krishna Shah (Nepalese royal) =

King of Gorkha Kingdom from 1645 to 1661

- Posthumous painting of Krishna Shah

King of Gorkha
- Reign: 1645–1661
- Predecessor: Dambar Shah
- Successor: Rudra Shah
- Issue: Rudra Shah
- Dynasty: Shah dynasty
- Father: Dambar Shah
- Religion: Hinduism

Krishna Shah (Nepali: कृष्ण शाह; 1625–1661) was King of the Gorkha Kingdom in the Indian subcontinent, present-day Nepal, who succeeded his father Dambar Shah, and reigned from 1645 till his death in 1661. He was the father of his successor Rudra Shah.

Preceded by Dambar Shah	King of Gorkha; 1645–1661	Succeeded by Rudra Shah
