= Rudra Shah =

King of Gorkha Kingdom from 1661 to 1673

- Posthumous painting of Rudra Shah

King of Gorkha
- Reign: 1661–1673
- Predecessor: Krishna Shah
- Successor: Prithvipati Shah
- Issue: Prithvipati Shah
- Dynasty: Shah dynasty
- Father: Krishna Shah
- Religion: Hinduism

Rudra Shah (Nepali: रूद्र शाह) was King of the Gorkha Kingdom in the Himalayan region, present-day Nepal, between 1661 and 1673.

Krishna Shah, his predecessor, was his father. Rudra reigned from 1661 to 1673 and was succeeded by his son Prithvipati Shah.

Preceded by Krishna Shah	King of Gorkha; 1661–1673	Succeeded by Prithvipati Shah
