= Purna Shah =

King of Gorkha Kingdom from 1570 to 1605

- Posthumous painting of Purna Shah

King of Gorkha
- Reign: 1570–1605
- Predecessor: Dravya Shah
- Successor: Chatra Shah
- Issue: Chatra Shah; Ram Shah
- Dynasty: Shah dynasty
- Father: Dravya Shah
- Religion: Hinduism

Purna Shah (Nepali: पूर्ण शाह; ruled 1570–1605), or Purendra Shah, was King of the Gorkha Kingdom in present-day Nepal in the Indian subcontinent. He was the father of Chatra Shah, as well as the father of Ram Shah, the fourth king of Gorkha.

Preceded by Dravya Shah	King of Gorkha; 1570–1605	Succeeded by Chatra Shah
