= Dambar Shah =

King of Gorkha Kingdom from 1636 to 1645

- Posthumous painting of Dambar Shah

King of Gorkha
- Reign: 1636–1645
- Predecessor: Ram Shah
- Successor: Krishna Shah
- Issue: Krishna Shah
- Dynasty: Shah dynasty
- Father: Ram Shah
- Religion: Hinduism

Dambar Shah (Nepali: डम्बर शाह, ?–1645) was a King of the Gorkha Kingdom, present-day Gorkha District, Nepal who reigned from 1636 until his death in 1645. He was the father of Krishna Shah.

== Reign ==
King Tula Sen wanted to attack Gorkha after the death of Ram Shah, father of Dambar.

Dambar Shah visited the Kingdom of Lalitpur after being invited by Siddhi Narasimha Malla to celebrate the construction of Krishna Mandir. Unfortunately, King Pratap Malla attacked them, and the wealth of Dambar Shah was also confiscated. One of the Bansawali states that Dambar Shah was married to Padmavati, the daughter of King Hambir Sen of Tanahu. Bhasa Bansawali states that he had four other Queens, and Krishna Shah, the Crown Prince of Gorkha was born through Varnavati.

Preceded by Ram Shah	King of Gorkha; 1636–1645	Succeeded by Krishna Shah
