= Chatra Shah =

King of Gorkha Kingdom from 1605 to 1606

- Posthumous painting of Chatra Shah

King of Gorkha
- Reign: 1605–1606
- Predecessor: Purna Shah
- Successor: Ram Shah
- Issue: None
- Dynasty: Shah dynasty
- Father: Purna Shah
- Religion: Hinduism

Chatra Shah also Chhatra Shah, Ksatra Shah (Nepali: छत्र शाह; c. 1605–1606) was briefly King of the Gorkha Kingdom, in present-day Nepal in the Indian subcontinent, after the death of his father Purna Shah. He was the brother of Rama Shah.

Preceded by Purna Shah	King of Gorkha; 1605–1606	Succeeded by Ram Shah
