= Dravya Shah =

King of Gorkha Kingdom from 1559 to 1570

Dravya Shah श्री श्री राजा द्रव्य शाह
- Posthumous painting of Dravya Shah

King of Gorkha
- Reign: 1559–1570
- Coronation: September 1559
- Predecessor: Position established
- Successor: Purna Shah
- Born: Nepal
- Died: 1570; Gorkha, Gorkha Kingdom, Nepal
- Issue: Purna Shah
- Dynasty: Shah dynasty
- Father: Yasho Brahma Shah
- Religion: Hinduism

Dravya Shah (Nepali: द्रव्य शाह; 1559–1570) was the first King of the Gorkha Kingdom in Nepal. He was the father of Purna Shah, king of Gorkha. Dravya Shah's allies were Bhagirath Panta, Ganesh Pandey, Keshav Bohara, Narayan Aryal, Sarveshwar Khanal, and Gangaram Rana Magar, all of whom belonged to the six families of courtiers in Gorkha—known as the Thar Ghar—and knew all parts of the region. Following his coronation in 1559 after defeating the Magar kings Dalsur Ghale Magar of Liglig and Mansingh Khadka Magar, Narayan Aryal was Dravya Shah's spiritual tutor (guru); Sarveshwar Khanal was the royal pandit; Ganesh Pandey and Bhagirath Panta were minister (Kaji) and commander-in-chief, respectively; Keshav Bohara was given the responsibility to regulate lands and land revenue; and Gangaram Rana Magar was appointed chief of the administration of justice.

| Preceded by established | King of Gorkha; 1559–1570 | Succeeded by Purna Shah |
