= Biraj Thapa Magar =

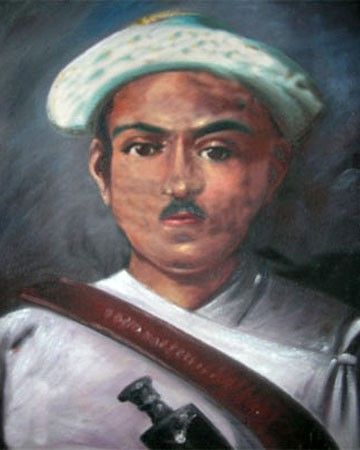
Kaji Biraj Thapa Magar, 1st Army Chief of Prithvi Narayan Shah of Gorkha

Kaji Biraj Thapa Magar ( काजी बिराज थापा मगर ) (died 1721) played an important role in the Gorkha Kingdom. His leadership, prudence and courage all exhibit that he was one of the important Royal courtier Gorkha/Gorkhali Bhardars (गोरखाली भारदार) that helped Narbaupal Shah become King of Gorkha. He may also be seen as a King Maker in the modern day term. According to different genealogies, he had taken Narabhupal Shah and his mother Malikavati in custody for three months. The Queen Mother and her son were secretly protected at his residence. After the death of his grandfather, Narabhupal Shah became the King of Gorkha in 1716 and died in 1743. His son, King Prithvi Narayan Shah, succeeding him began unification of small principalities to found modern Nepal.

== Birth, childhood and education ==
No record so far is available as to when and where was Biraj Thapa Magar born but according to Prithvidhoj Thapa Magar's report, he died 4 years after Narbhupal Shah's accession to the throne of Gorkha Kingdom in 1716 which would mean he died in 1721 (Pant 2041: 245). He seems to have been born to the famed Saint Lakhan Thapa Magar - I family of Gorkha. Saint Lakhan Thapa Magar - I, was a spiritually famed associate and adviser to King Ram Shah (1606 - 1636) and priest of Manakamana Temple also. There is a long description on Lakhan Thapa Magar - I in the Gorkhavamshavali, the only authoritative Genealogy of Shah Kings of Nepal. Historian Bikramjit Hasrat has also written that Saint Lakhan Thapa Magar - I, ran Gorkha Kingdom administration while King Ram Shah was deep in meditation, tapas for 4 months.

== King Prithvipati Shah's long rule ==
King Prithvipati Shah became King of Gorkha in 1669. He ruled Gorkha for 47 years until his death in 1716 . But Birbhadra Shah (बीरभद्र शाह), the crown prince died very young. The crown prince's wife Malikavati was pregnant and had gone to her father's home in Tanahu. The king's another son Uddhot Shah (उद्धोत शाह) claimed his stake on the throne. Therefore, there was some unrest in the Gorkha household as to who should succeed the king.

== A Panchyat convenes ==
To choose a new king, a Panchayat (Committee of Bhardars) convened and it decided to crown deceased King Prithvipati Shah's another son Randurlav Shah (रणदुर्लभ शाह ). It was not a unanimous decision. In protest, Kaji Biraj Thapa Magar, along with Kaji Bhimraj Pande(father of Kaji Kalu Pande), Kaji Bireshwor Panday, Gaureshwor Pant, Laxmipati Pant and Bali Kadariya did not attend the meeting. (Pant 2041:175) So, the plan by some other Bhadars to crown Randurlav Shah failed flat.

== Bhardars meet at Biraj Thapa's residence ==
Since Narabhupal Shah was the deceased Crown Prince Birbhadra Shah's son, the Youngest son of King Prithivipati Shah's, prince Chandrarup Shah believed it was too important to bring Narabhupal Shah to Gorkha and this point of view was supported by Biraj Thapa as he also argued for lawful line of accession to the throne. As a result, Narabhupal Shah and his mother were in Biraj Thapa's custody for three months. Other Bhardars: Madhukar Shah, Janaggir Shah, Bhim Raj Panday, Bireshwor Panday, Gaureshwor Pant, Laxmipati Pant and Bali Kadariya agreed and supported Biraj Thapa's stand. So, those all Bhardars went to Biraj Thapa's residence to crown Narabhupal Shah of Gorkha kingdom.

If Kaji Biraj Thapa Magar had not taken such a bold step and risk, some other prince would have become King of Gorkha and there would have been no Prithvi Narayan Shah to unify modern day Nepal.

After the death of Kaji Biraj Thapa Magar in 1721, his office was entrusted to his son Kaji Ram Krishna Thapa Magar.
