= Battle of Makwanpur =

Battle of Makwanpur may refer to:

- Battle of Makwanpur (1762), a battle between the Gorkha Kingdom and the Kingdom of Makwanpur
- Battle of Makwanpur (1763), a battle between the Gorkha Kingdom and the Nawab of Bengal
- Battle of Makwanpur (1816), a battle between the Kingdom of Nepal and the East India Company
