= Birbhadra Upadhyay =

18th century treasurer and military commander of Nepal

- वीरभद्र उपाध्याय

Treasurer
- Monarch: Prithvi Narayan Shah

Military service
- Allegiance: Gorkha kingdom; Kingdom of Nepal
- Branch/service: Nepalese Army
- Rank: Commander
- Battles/wars: Battle of Sindhuli (1767)

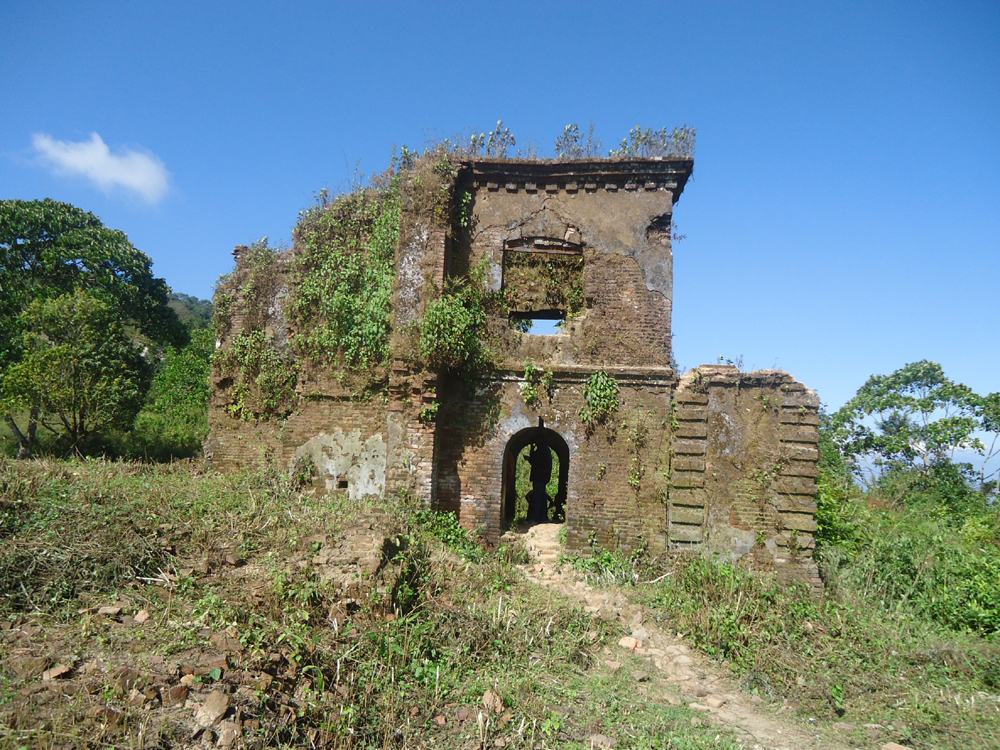
Ruins of the Sindhuli Gadhi

Birbhadra Upadhyay was a Nepalese administrative official and military commander during the reign King Prithvi Narayan Shah. He served as a treasurer (Kajanchi), overseeing state finances, logistics, and military supplies. He is known for his role in the Battle of Sindhuli, a major military conflict fought during the unification of Nepal.

During the battle, Updhayay served as both a logistician and a military commander. He led his Grokhali troops alongside Kaji Shriharsha Panta, Kaji Vamsharaj Pande, and Sardar Banshu Gurung in defending an expeditionary force of the East India Company, led by Captain George Kinlock.

== See also ==
- Sindhuligadhi War Museum
