= Bishnu Pratap Shah =

Chief Election Commissioner of Nepal

Secretary, Ministry of Information and Communication

Chief Election Commissioner of Nepal
- In office 26 April 1993 – 3 August 2001
- Monarchs: Birendra (until 1 June 2001), Gyanendra
- Preceded by: Surya Prasad Shrestha

Personal details
- Born: 1 August 1936
- Died: 29 April 2005 (aged 68)
- Citizenship: Nepalese
- Spouse: Ishwori Shah
- Occupation: Administrator

Bishnu Pratap Shah (1 August 1936 – 29 April 2005) was a Nepalese bureaucrat and administrator in the service sector. Shah, who had been appointed to important positions of Zonal Commissioner and Government Secretary during the party-less Panchayat era, also served as the Chief Election Commissioner of Nepal, after the restoration of democracy in 1990, on the basis of his personal integrity and dedication to work.

He occasionally published in Kantipur daily. In one article he underlined the need to hold Constituent Assembly elections as he determined the root cause of the Maoist insurgency.

Shah steered the Election Commission so perfectly that it facilitated Nepal to hold Parliamentary, as well as local level elections on the basis of the principle of adult-franchise to the satisfaction of all the political parties and the mission of the Peoples Movement. He is also the longest serving Chief Election Commissioner of Nepal's history.

== Personal life ==
He was Born in Maidi VDC Ward No. 2, Dhading district on 29 August 1937 to father Captain Lal Jung Shah and mother Subhadra Kumari. Shah was married to Ishwori Shah in 1971 and has a son Bimal Pratap Shah and a daughter Binita Shah (Khadka) and grandchildren Shivashish Pratap Shah and Biraj Khadka. Shah died on 29 April 2005.

== Education and career ==
Shah had received Master's Degree from Michigan State University in Anthropology. Shah started his career in civil service as the publicity officer of the then Election Commission in 1958 B.S. and served under different capacities including district Panchayat Secretary, Palpa, Chief District Officer of Gorkha, Syangja and Sunsari, Deputy Director General of Radio Nepal, Joint Secretary in different government offices including the National Planning Commission, Zonal Commissioner of Bagmitati Zone and Secretary in the Ministry of Home Affairs and Ministry of Information and Communication, and the Prime Minister's Office. He also served as the first Chief Election Commissioner of Nepal after the restoration of democracy in 1990. He had also served as board of director of different organizations including Radio Nepal and also served as the first chairperson of the French owned Indosuez Bank in Nepal.

== Representing Nepal ==
He had represented various government delegations to different countries including China, India, Cambodia, France and USA under different capacities. Shah paid visits to different countries including United States, Italy, France, Finland, the Netherlands, Germany, United Kingdom, Philippines, Cambodia, China, India, Hong Kong, Switzerland, Spain, Thailand, Pakistan, Sri Lanka, Egypt and Bangladesh under different occasions.

== Honors and accolades ==
Besides being honoured as the Chairman of Association of Asian Election Authorities (AAEA), he was also decorated with Trishakti Patta (Second) and Gorkha Dakshina Bahu (Second) at home and Legion of Honour (highest civilian honour of France). Shah had also served as chairman of board of directors of different schools, colleges and trusts. He had also authored various articles in Nepal and abroad on the topics of history, politics, administration, literature, tourism etc.

Shah was a patriotic person, dedicated civil servant and an efficient administrator. "With his quality to identify and solve problems, democratic attitude and thorough political analysis, many people will remember him for a long time" writes Ghanashyam Kandel. Senior journalist Yuvaraj Ghimire points out that "Shah did not only display honesty and spotless nature during his 45 year long career in public positions, he had also become non-controversial despite the change in political system and successfully conducted four elections including parliamentary and local level ones. He was liberal, cooperative and continued academic studies even after retirement from public service." "Shah always tried to forge consensus among the election commissioners while taking key decisions and he had never tried to impose his ideas on others" recalls BIrendra Prasad Mishra, who had worked as the Election Commissioner under the tenure of Shah. As a student Shah was talented, a mixable friend, qualified administrator, honest and loving parent of his family members. He had extraordinary wisdom, dedication and hardworking capacity and capacity to analyze things. We all may get inspiration from his life full of dedication, hard work, honesty and high intellectual capacity.

== Lineage ==
Bishnu Pratap Shah, according to the Shah dynastic linkage tree, directly represents the 16th generation of the then King Dravya Shah, the first king of Gorkha and Shah is descendant of Chandrarup Shah and Chautariya Pushkar Shah. Chandrarup Shah was the youngest son of King Prithwi-pati Shah [1] and Queen Kulangavati. He was appointed as Regent for his nephew Maharaj Nara Bhupal Shah, while Chautariya Pushkar Shah was appointed to the post of Prime Minister in 1838.

== See also ==
- Chief Election Commissioner of Nepal
