= Chandrarup Shah =

Maharaj Adhirajkumar Chandrarup Shah was the youngest son of Prithvipati Shah and Rani Kulangavati. He is notable in the history of Nepal for skillfully resolving a power struggle within the Royal House of Gorkha between Dal Shah and Udyot Shah following the death of their elder brother, Crown Prince Birbhadra Shah. Chandrarup Shah was subsequently appointed as the regent for his nephew, Maharaj Nara Bhupal Shah.

== Death of Yuvaraj Birbhadra Shah ==
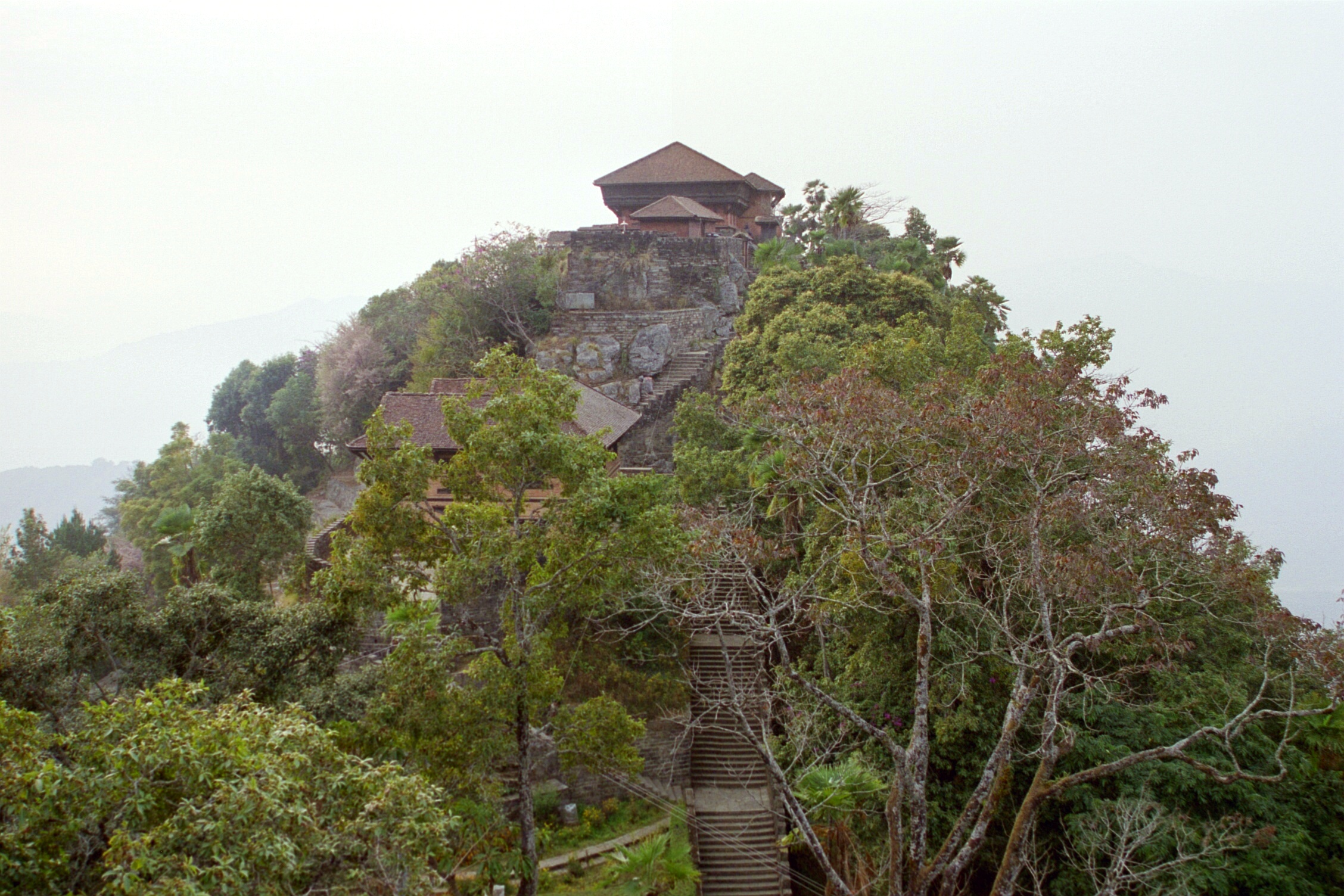
Gorkha Palace

Yuvaraj Birbhadra Shah, the eldest son of Prithvipati Shah, entered into matrimony with the daughter of the Raja of Tanahun. From the outset, he maintained strict discretion regarding the queen's pregnancy, keeping the matter private within the family.

In a deeply personal and solemn conversation, his youngest brother, Chandrarup Shah, confided:

"Our bond has been profound since childhood, and I entrust this matter to you alone. My health appears frail, with little hope of recovery. My queen is with child and has sought refuge at her father’s residence. Should I be taken by divine will, I implore you to ensure her welfare and to provide her with your steadfast support."

Birbhadra Shah pledged, with unwavering resolve, to fulfill his brother's wishes with every measure of his strength, wealth, and life. He reassured Chandrarup that his household would be carefully tended, offering solace while urging him not to dwell on the uncertainties of fate.

Upon Birbhadra's untimely passing, Chandrarup discreetly learned that the late queen had successfully given birth to Nara Bhupal Shah in Tanahun. This event preserved the continuity of the royal lineage and honored the solemn promise made between brothers, marking a significant moment in the history of the Shah dynasty.

== Maharaj Narabhupal Shah ==
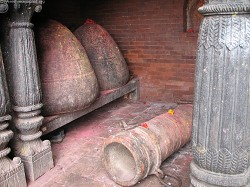
Cannon with inscription mentioning the contribution of Chandrarup Shah during the reign of King Prithivipati Shah, Gorkha Palace

Maharaj Prithwipati Shah reigned over Gorkha from 1673 to 1716 A.D. Enthralled by the splendor of Malla art and architecture during his sojourn in Kathmandu, he sought to replicate its grandeur in Gorkha. Consequently, he commissioned the construction of temples dedicated to goddess Kali, Lord Pashupati, Hanuman (the Monkey god), and the footprints of the sage Gorakhnath, from whom Gorkha derived its name. Remarkably, the images of Pashupati and Hanuman mirrored those found in the Kathmandu Valley. Maharaj Prithwipati Shah's contributions also extended to the establishment of the revered temple of Goddess Manakamana.

In his advanced age, Maharaj Prithwipati Shah faced a dilemma regarding the selection of a successor. The loss of his eldest son without an heir raised concerns. The second son, Dal Shah, was deemed unfit due to having only one eye, while choosing the third son, Udyot Shah, posed the ethical challenge of favoring a younger heir over an elder. The royal council was divided, with some advocating for the second son and others for the third, unable to reach a consensus.

During this period of uncertainty, Chandrarup Shah approached Maharaj Prithwipati Shah in a private audience, proposing that the established tradition be maintained. According to this practice, not all sons of the Raja could ascend to the throne, and adherence to precedent would resolve the impasse.

Chandrarup Shah then informed the Maharaj of the pregnant queen of Birbhadra Shah and the subsequent birth of Nara Bhupal Shah. Though reassured, Prithwipati remained cautious. Attempts to secure Nara Bhupal Shah from the Raja of Tanahun were initially unsuccessful, as he refused to release the child due to ambitions over Gorkha's sovereignty.

Undeterred, Chandrarup Shah devised a plan, bribing the nurse and attendants of Nara Bhupal Shah. With their assistance, he brought the child to his residence in Gorkha and safeguarded him for three years. In the fourth year, Chandrarup orchestrated a pivotal moment: placing Nara Bhupal Shah on the back of a slave, he presented him before the Maharaj. When asked about the boy's identity, the slave confirmed he was the Sahib ji (heir apparent), yet the Maharaj remained silent.

During a subsequent occasion, when Nara Bhupal Shah was seen swimming nude before the Maharaj, the ruler recognized him as the incarnation of Birbhadra Shah. Seizing the moment, he brought the young heir to the Durbar, where he ascended the gaddi seated on the Maharaj's lap.

In recognition of Chandrarup Shah's role in restoring the lost heir, the Maharaj praised him, saying, "Syabas! You have fulfilled your duty to the utmost." He further declared, "Henceforth, my descendants will regard yours as their own brothers," and granted that Chandrarup's jagirs and birtas would descend to his posterity rent-free.

Following the death of Prithwipati Shah, the loyalty of Chandrarup Shah and other courtiers ensured that Nara Bhupal Shah ascended the throne without bloodshed. Nara Bhupal Shah later became the father of Prithvi Narayan Shah, who ascended the gaddi at the age of twelve in Saka 1644 (1742 A.D.).

== Descendants ==
Chandrarup Shah had two sons: Vishnurup Shah and Birbaha Shah. Vishnurup Shah had only one son, Jiv Shah. Jiv Shah, in turn, had three sons: Sri Chautaria Prana Shah (granted the title of Sri Chautaria in 1803), Shamsher Shah, and General H.E. Sri Chautariya Pushkar Shah.

General H.E. Sri Chautaria Pushkar Shah was born in 1784 and received a private education. He served as the governor of Doti from 1831 to 1837, as a special ambassador to China from 1837 to 1838, as Mukhtiyar (Prime Minister) from 1838 to 1839, and as Councilor of State from 1840 to 1843. He died in 1841. He had four sons: Sri Chautaria Bhim Bikram Shah, Rana Bikram Shah, Colonel Sri Chautaria Bir Bikram Shah, and Colonel Ambar Bikram Shah.

Colonel Ambar Bikram Shah was executed by the Ranas for his involvement in an attempted coup d'état at Teku in January 1882. His son, Jabbar Jung, escaped from Kathmandu disguised as a Jogi along with his son Amar Jung Shah, seeking refuge in a village. Jabbar Jung's mission was to organize an army to overthrow the regime of Ranodeep Singh Kunwar.

Jabbar Jung's daughter married Maharaj Bhim Shamsher Jung Bahadur Rana, and she gave birth to Maharaj Padma Shumsher.
