= Daljit Shah =

- Prince of Gorkha
- Born: Gorkha Kingdom
- Died: Nepal
- Nepali: दलजित शाह
- Dynasty: Shah dynasty
- Father: Nara Bhupal Shah
- Religion: Hinduism

Daljit Shah (Nepali: दलजित शाह) was a Prince of the Gorkha Kingdom. He was active during the military campaign known as the Unification of Nepal led by his brother, King Prithvi Narayan Shah.

He held the rank of Chautaria, and Kaji. Shah commanded various battles including the Capture of Palanchok, the Battle of Kirtipur, the Battle of Kavre, and the Battle of Makwanpur.

Shah and Bahadur Shah were allegedly conspiring against Pratap Singh Shah to crown Bahadur Shah as the king of Nepal. When the conspiracy was discovered, Daljit Shah and Bahadur Shah were imprisoned in Nuwakot.
