= Kaushalyavati Devi =

Queen of Gorkha Kingdom (c. 18th century)

- Queen consort of Gorkha
- Born: Palpa
- Died: Gorkha
- Spouse: Nara Bhupal Shah
- Issue: Prithvi Narayan Shah; Dal Mardan Shah; Prithvi Pal Shah; Padma Kumari Devi; Bisaul Budana Devi
Names
- Kaushalyavati Devi
- Dynasty: House of Shah (by marriage)
- Father: Gundharva Sen, Raja of Palpa and Binayakpur
- Religion: Hinduism

Kaushalyavati Devi (Nepali: कौशल्यावती शाह) or Kaushalyawati Devi was a queen consort of Gorkha.

Her father, Gundharva Sen, was a Raja of Palpa and Binayakpur. He added considerably to his lands, with the help of the Rajas of Gulmi and Kanchi. She was the second wife of King Nara Bhupal Shah, and the mother of Prithvi Narayan Shah, who was the king of unified Nepal from 1768 to 1775 C.E., She gave birth to Prithvi Narayan Shah prematurely, after 7 months of pregnancy.
