= Asal Hindustan (historical name) =

Historical name of Nepal

Flag of Nepal used from 1856 to around 1930

Asal Hindustan (Nepali: असल हिन्दुस्तान, lit. 'real Hindustan') was a historical name of the Kingdom of Nepal establishment by the Gorkha King Prithvi Narayan Shah during the 18th century CE. The term Asal Hindustan was coined by the Gorkha King Prithvi Narayan Shah for his newly conquered territories. The King Prithvi Narayan Shah unified Nepal in the 18th century. He used the term Asal Hindustan to distinguish his kingdom from the northern Indian plains, which were then under the Mughal regime and pejoratively called as Mughlana.

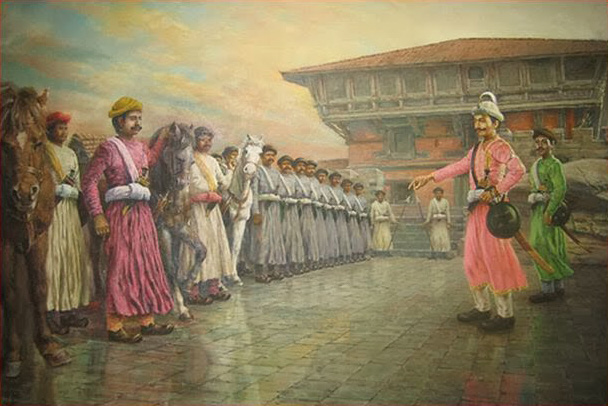
The Gorkhali Army preparing for war on the Kathmandu Valley.

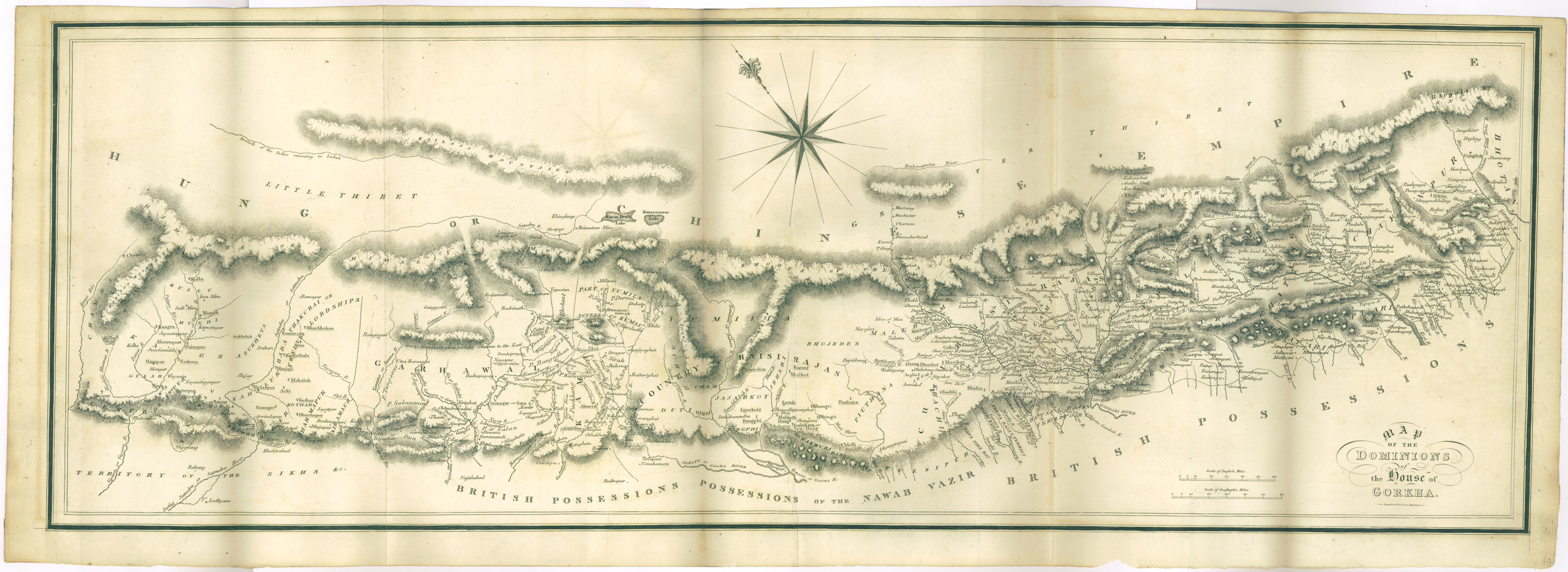
Map of the dominions of the House of Gorkha from Francis Hamilton M. D. named "An Account of the Gorkha Kingdom and the Territories annexed to this Dominion by the House of Gorkha", 1819

== Etymology ==
The literal meaning of the term Asal Hindustan is a true land of Hindus. It is also translated as real Hindustan. The term "Asal" is derived from Arabic and translates to "real" or "genuine" and similarly the term "Hindustan" literally translates to "the land of Hindus". Thus the literal meaning of Asal Hindustan is a "genuine land of Hindus" and/or a "real Hindustan".

== History ==
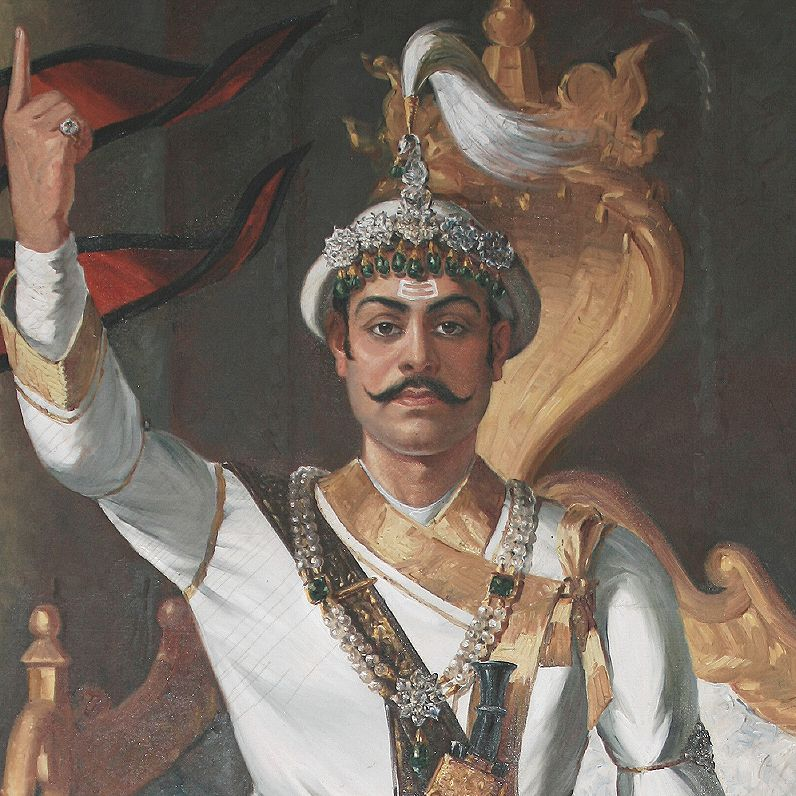
Image of Prithvi Narayan Shah, the founder of the modern Himalayan nation of Nepal.

During the period of the 17th – 18th century, the major part of the Indian subcontinent was under the rule of foreigner invaders known as Mughal Empire. The Gorkha King Prithvi Narayan Shah, after ascending the throne of his own Gorkha Kingdom, started unifying the northern smaller hill states of the Indian subcontinent. He conquered all the states of the Baisi Rajya and Chaubisi Rajya in the subcontinent. He also conquered the valley of Kathmandu. After that he declared his unified kingdom as a Hindu Kingdom and used the phrase Asal Hindustan for the name of his kingdom. This was in contrast to the northern Indian plains, which he perceived as being influenced by foreign (Mughal) occupation. Essentially it was a way of King Prithvi Narayan Shah to distinguish his kingdom as a place that maintained traditional Hindu values. The victorious king himself described his kingdom as Asal Hindustan (i.e, pure Hindu kingdom) in his divine discourse Divyopadesh, and thus claimed a special status within it as a region uncontaminated by Muslim or Christian presence or occupation. The important factor that sustained the unification effort of the Kingdom was the use of Hinduism as a source of legitimacy.

Asal Hindustan was considered as a garden of four Varna and thirty-six jati ruled by a Saivite or Vaishnavite ruler who could organise social relations appropriately. According to historian, those days only the Kathmandu Valley was termed as Nepal, but the entire unified kingdom of Gorkhas was known as Asal Hindustan until the 1930.

Similarly in the western part of the subcontinent, the Hindu flag bearer ruler were Marathas until the early period of 19th century. After the arrival of the British empire in the subcontinent, the British empire gradually took control on entire parts of the subcontinent leaving kingdom of Gorkhas as only one isolated Hindu kingdom. According to a British resident Brian Hodgson, when the flag of Hinduism fell from the hands of the Marathas in 1817, they urged the Nepalese to take it up and wave it proudly until it could be hoisted again over the plains after driving out the vile Firangis and subjugating the arrogant followers of Islam. After that the monarchy of Gorkhas claimed themselves to be the only one remaining Hindustan in the Indian subcontinent.
