= Sindhuli Gadhi =

Nepalese Fort

- Sindhuli District
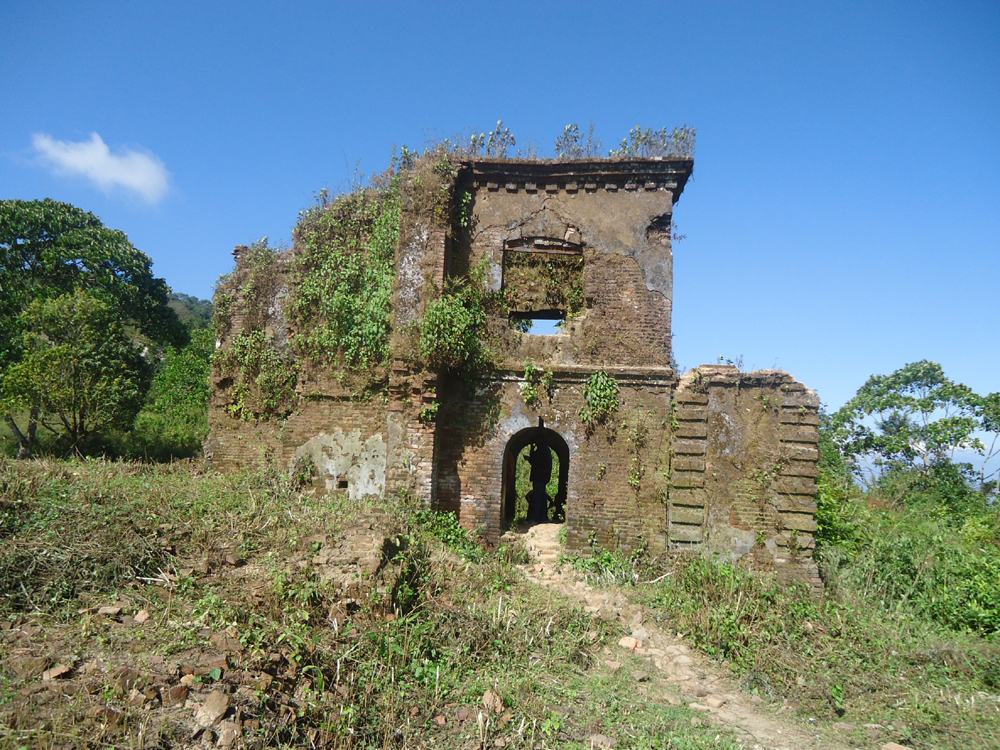

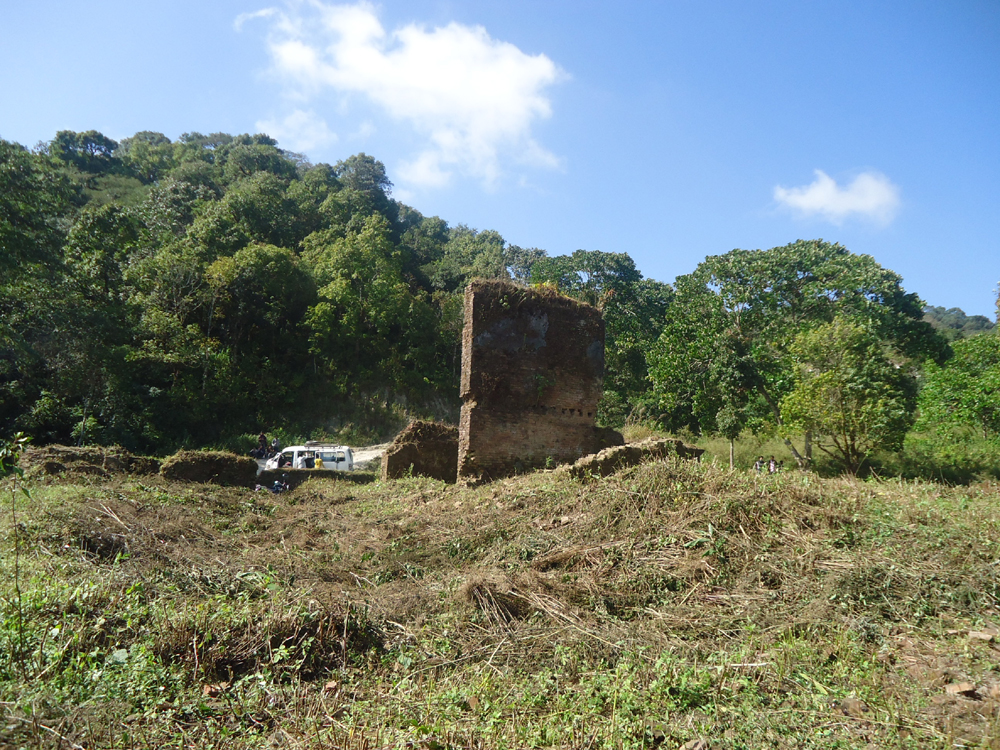
- The ruins of Sindhuli Gadhi

Site information
- Condition: Ruins

Location
- Sindhuli Gadhi in Map of Nepal
- Location within Nepal
- Coordinates: 27.2806°N 85.95501°E

Site history
- Materials: Stone, Mud
- Battles/wars: Battle of Sindhuli

Sindhuli Gadhi (Nepali: सिन्धुलीगढी, lit. 'Sindhuli fort') is an historical fort and tourist attraction in central Nepal. Sindhuli Gadhi is famous for the battle between the then Gorkha Army and the East India Company led by Captain George Kinloch. The Gorkha force under the command of Birbhadra Upadhyay and Banshu Gurung defeated the East India Company troops in October 1767 (Ashoj 15, 1824 BS).

Sindhuli Gadhi lies in Sindhuli District of Janakpur Zone. It is currently a tourist attraction.

== Sindhuli Gadhi War ==
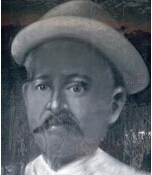
Banshu Gurung, one of the commanders in the Battle of Sindhuli

In connection to the unification of Nepal King Prithivi Narayan Shah surrounded the Kathmandu Valley and made an economic blockade. The king of Kathmandu at the time, Jaya Prakash Malla, then wrote a letter to the British military in India, requesting for military assistance.

In August 1767, when the forces of British India arrived in Sindhuli Gadhi, the Gorkha military conducted a guerrilla attack against them. Many of the British Indian forces were killed and the rest eventually fled, leaving behind a huge amount of weapons and ammunition, which were seized by the Gorkha army.

Gorkha army under Banshu Gurung's command had prevented the British troops from advancing towards the Kathmandu Valley.

Gorkhas had used unconventional war tactics like unleashing the hornets and using nettles, among a variety of other tactics, to defeat the British soldiers.

== Historical Commemoration ==
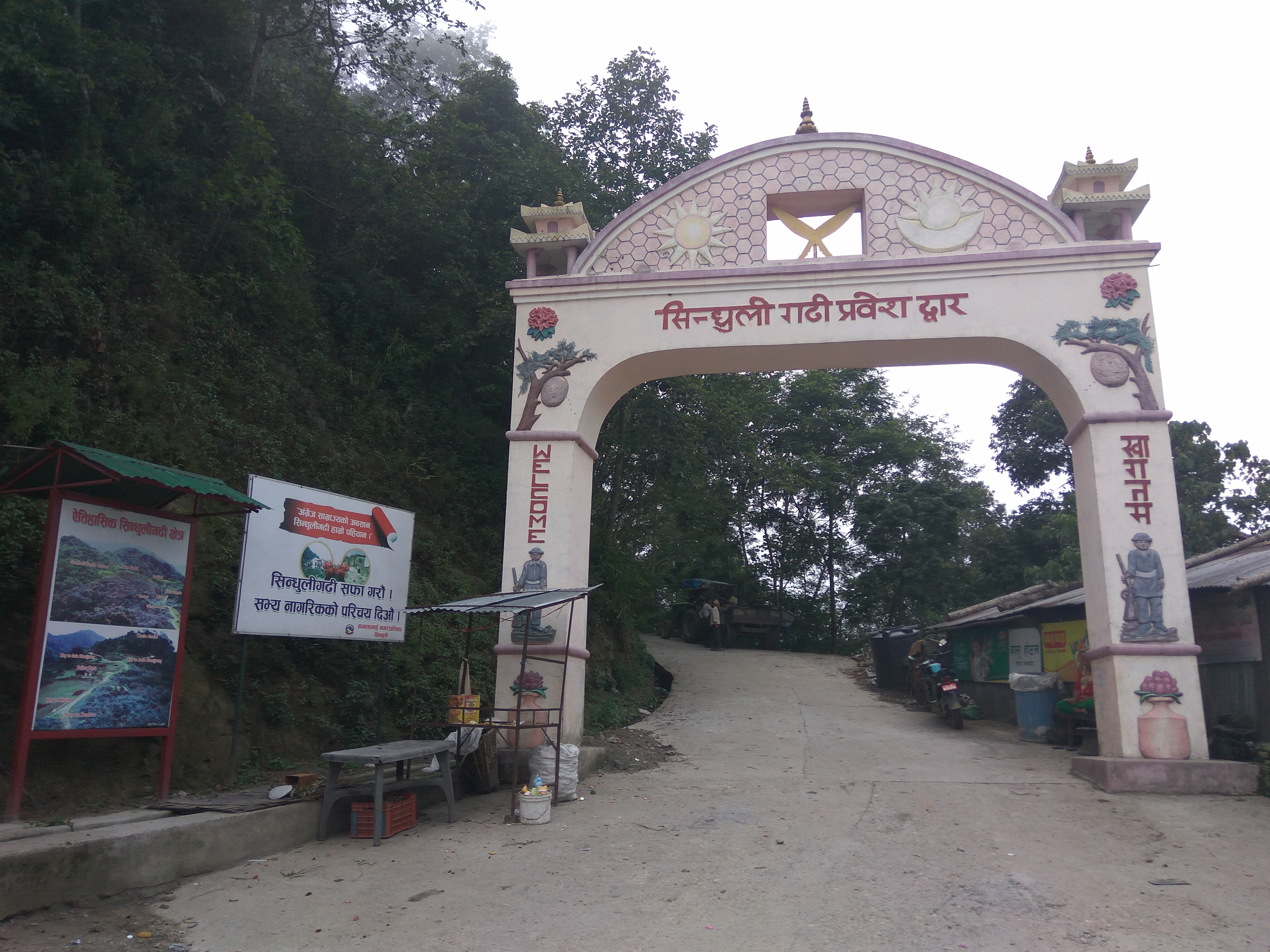
Sindhuli Gadhi Gate

The Sindhuli War Memorial Day is celebrated every year in Sindhuli Gadhi to commemorate the victory of then Gorkha Army against British force. Nepal Army hoists the Nepali flag with salutation.

== Climate ==
Climate data for Sindhuli Gadhi, elevation 1,463 m (4,800 ft)
Month	Jan	Feb	Mar	Apr	May	Jun	Jul	Aug	Sep	Oct	Nov	Dec	Year
Mean daily maximum °C (°F)	15.4 (59.7)	17.4 (63.3)	21.0 (69.8)	24.7 (76.5)	25.1 (77.2)	25.2 (77.4)	24.8 (76.6)	25.1 (77.2)	24.1 (75.4)	23.4 (74.1)	20.7 (69.3)	17.2 (63.0)	22.0 (71.6)
Mean daily minimum °C (°F)	2.7 (36.9)	4.3 (39.7)	7.6 (45.7)	13.2 (55.8)	15.5 (59.9)	17.5 (63.5)	18.1 (64.6)	17.6 (63.7)	16.7 (62.1)	13.7 (56.7)	7.5 (45.5)	3.6 (38.5)	11.5 (52.7)
Average precipitation mm (inches)	24.8 (0.98)	15.3 (0.60)	38.7 (1.52)	98.0 (3.86)	203.9 (8.03)	437.7 (17.23)	691.2 (27.21)	581.0 (22.87)	423.2 (16.66)	132.8 (5.23)	14.8 (0.58)	10.2 (0.40)	2,671.6 (105.17)
Source 1: Australian National University
Source 2: Japan International Cooperation Agency (precipitation)

== See also ==
- Sindhuligadhi War Museum
