= Queen Indra of Nepal =

Queen consort of Nepal

Indra Kumari Devi

Queen Consort of Gorkha
- Tenure: 3 April 1743 — 25 September 1768

Queen consort of Nepal
- Tenure: 25 September 1768 — 11 January 1775
- Born: 1724; Kingdom of Makwanpur
- Died: 11 January 1775 (aged 50–51); Devighat, Nuwakot
- Spouse: Prithvi Narayan Shah (m. 1738)
- Issue: Bilas Kumari
- Dynasty: Shah dynasty (by marriage)
- Father: Hem Karna Sen

Indra Kumari Devi was the first wife of Prithvi Narayan Shah, King of Nepal. Born to Hem Karna Sen, King of Makwanpur, she was married to Shah in February 1738, at the age of 14. During the wedding ceremony, a conflict arose, subsequently he went home without a bride. She with other wives of Prithvi Narayan Shah committed sati on 11 January 1775 in Devighat.
