= Bilas Kumari =

Daughter of Prithvi Narayan Shah of Nepal

- Princess of Gorkha; Princess of Nepal

Queen of Salyan
- Reign: 1766 – 1809
- Born: Gorkha Palace, Gorkha Kingdom
- Died: Kingdom of Nepal
- Spouse: Rana Bhim Shah (m. 1737)
- Nepali: विलासकुमारी
- Dynasty: Shah dynasty (by birth)
- Father: Prithvi Narayan Shah
- Mother: Indra Kumari Devi
- Religion: Hinduism

Bilas Kumari Devi (Nepali: विलासकुमारी; sometimes anglicized as Vilas Kumari) was the Queen of Salyan State. Born to King Prithvi Narayan Shah and Indra Kumari Devi, she is best remembered for her contributions to her father's Unification of Nepal campaign.

== Biography ==
Bilas Kumari was born to King Prithvi Narayan Shah and Indra Kumari Devi. Her mother was the daughter of the king of Makwanpur, Hem Karna Sen. Due to disputes with Sen, Prithvi Narayan Shah had married Narendra Rajya Laxmi Devi in 1740. In 1766, Bilas Kumari was married to Rana Bhim Shah, Crown Prince of Salyan. Her marriage was arranged by priest Siddha Bhagwant Nath, subsequently, which created an ally for the Gorkha Kingdom. Salyan was a relatively poor kingdom, she once remarked to her father why he had married her to a state that could not comfortably feed her. As a dowry, Shah had promised to give lands of various Chaubisi Rajyas to Salyan.

After her father's death, the Unification of Nepal was notability led by her half-brother Bahadur Shah and her step-mother Narendra Rajya Laxmi Devi. Bilas Kumari also participated in the battles of Argha, and Khanchi. After the king of Salyan went to Kashi, he crowned Rana Bhim Shah as the king. After Sher Bahadur Shah had assassinated deposed King Rana Bahadur Shah, she went to visit him in Nepal Durbar. She wanted to punish Bhimsen Thapa who she had believed had killed her half-brother. After Thapa had learned about her plan, he sent her back to Salyan and he created a plan to annex the state into Nepal. Despite being a daughter of Prithvi Narayan Shah, she was sanctioned severely by the court and she had sent her son, Raghunath Shah, to Oudh State for protection. Bilas Kumari was exiled in 1809.

== Legacy ==
Basant Maharjan writing for Himal Khabar said her contributions to the Unification of Nepal had largely been forgotten and he also added that she should be remembered as she played an important role during the campaign.
