= Battle of Makwanpur (1762) =

1762 battle

- Part of the Unification of Nepal
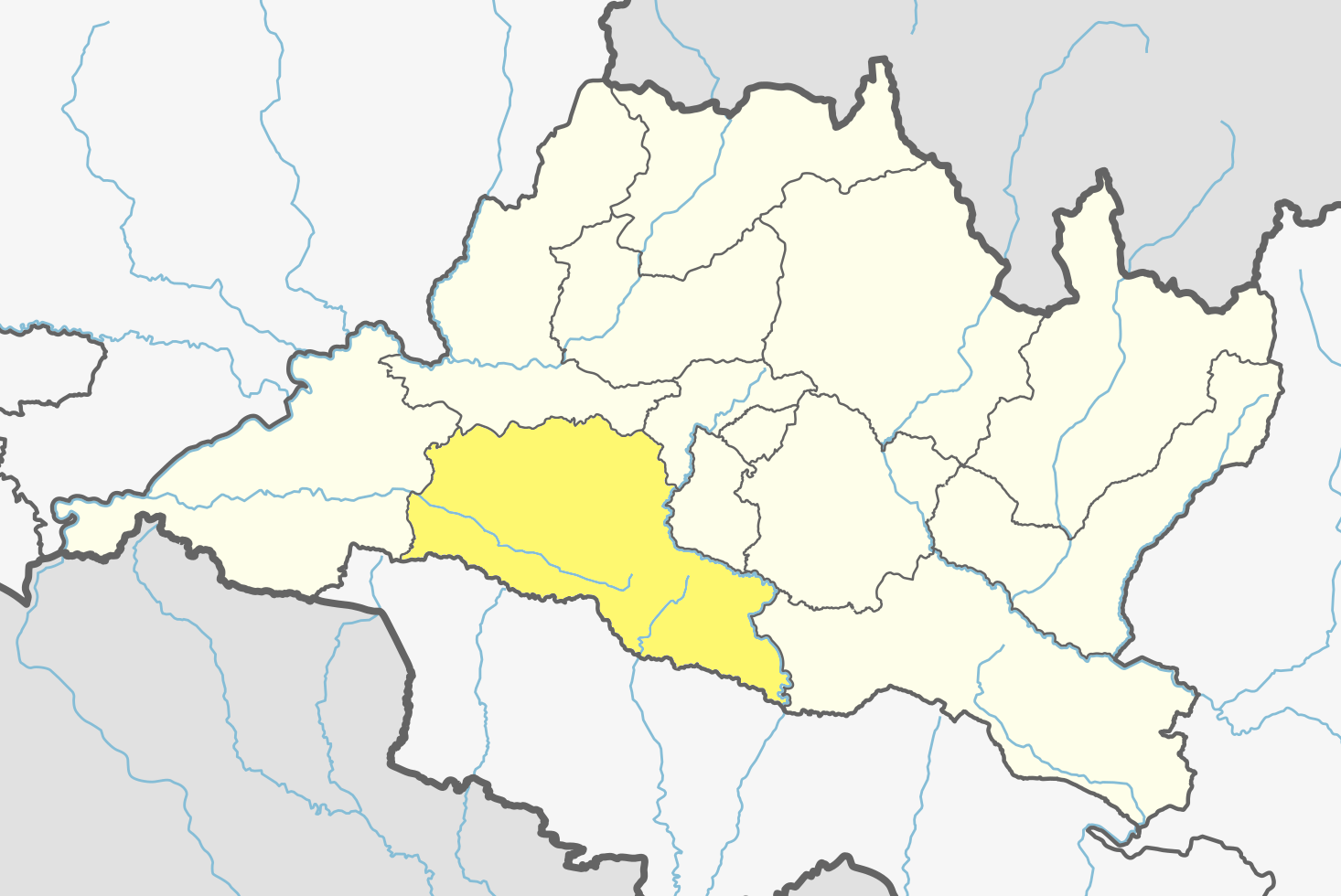
- Makwanpur in 2023
Date	21 August 1762
Location	Makwanpur Palace, Kingdom of Makwanpur (today part of Makwanpurgadhi, Bagmati Province, Nepal)
Result	Gorkhali victory

Belligerents
Gorkha Kingdom	Senas of Makwanpur

Commanders and leaders
Prithvi Narayan Shah; Mahoddam Kirti Shah; Dal Mardan Shah; Daljit Shah; Surpratap Shah; Vamsharaj Pande; Kehar Singh Basnyat	Digbandhan Sen

Casualties and losses
60 killed	400 killed

Battle of Makwanpur was fought on 21 August 1762 in Makwanpurgadhi, Nepal between the Gorkha Kingdom and the Kingdom of Makwanpur. The battle lasted for about eight hours and resulted in Gorkhali victory. 60 Gorkhali and 400 Makwanpur soldiers were killed in the battle.
