= Chief Election Commissioner of Nepal =

Constitutional post to the government of Nepal

- प्रमुख निर्वाचन आयुक्त
- Logo of The Election Commission of Nepal
- Incumbent; Man Bahadur Karki
- Election Commission of Nepal
- Status: Head of the Election Commission Nepal
- Nominator: Constitutional Council
- Appointer: President of Nepal
- Term length: 6 years or up to 65 years of age (whichever is prior)
- Inaugural holder: Subarna Shamsher Rana
- First holder: Surendra Bahadur Basnet
- Deputy: Election Commissoners
- Website: https://election.gov.np/en/

The Chief Election Commissioner of Nepal (Nepali: प्रमुख निर्वाचन आयुक्त) is the head of Election Commission, a constitutional body responsible for conducting and monitoring elections, as well as registering parties and candidates and reporting election outcomes, in Nepal. The president of Nepal appoints the Chief Election Commissioner and the Election Commissioners on the recommendation of Constitutional Council.

The term of Chief Election Commissioner and the Election Commissioners can be a maximum of six years from the date of appointment. The qualifications and eligibility of a person to serve as Chief Election Commissioner and Election Commissioners are clearly mentioned in Section 24, article 245 of Constitution of Nepal.

== Roles and powers ==
The Chief Election Commissioner of Nepal is the head and Chairperson of the Election Commission, as provided under Article 245 of the Constitution of Nepal. Appointed by the President on the recommendation of the Constitutional Council, the Chief Election Commissioner presides over Commission meetings, provides overall leadership, coordinates and supervises the commission's activities, and ensures the independent and impartial conduct of elections. The Chief Election Commissioner leads the Commission in conducting elections for the President, Vice-president, Federal Parliament, Provincial Assemblies and Local Governments, preparing and maintaining electoral rolls, conducting referendums where provided by law, and deciding disputes relating to candidates' qualifications before the declaration of election results. Article 246 also permits the Election Commission to delegate its constitutional functions, duties and powers to the Chief Election Commissioner under prescribed conditions. The Chief Election Commissioner chairs Commission meetings, determines meeting agendas, supervises the implementation of Commission decisions, oversees the Election Commission Secretariat, coordinates election administration and logistics, and represents the Commission in the discharge of its constitutional and statutory responsibilities.

== Appointment and term of Office ==
The Chief Election Commissioner of Nepal is appointed by the President of Nepal on the recommendation of the Constitutional Council, as provided under Article 245(2) of the Constitution of Nepal. The Election Commission consists of a Chief Election Commissioner and four other Election Commissioners, with the Chief Election Commissioner serving as the Chairperson of the commission. A person is eligible for appointment as Chief Election Commissioner if they possess the qualifications specified in Article 245(6), namely:

- holding a bachelor's degree from a recognized university,
- not being a member of any political party immediately before appointment,
- having attained the age of forty-five years,
- and possessing high moral character.

The term of office of the Chief Election Commissioner is six years from the date of appointment. The office becomes vacant before completion of the term if

- the Chief Election Commissioner submits a written resignation to the president,
- reaches the age of sixty-five,
- is removed through an impeachment motion in parliament,
- is removed by the president on the recommendation of the Constitutional Council due to physical or mental incapacity, or dies.

The Chief Election Commissioner is not eligible for reappointment after completing the term, although an Election Commissioner may be appointed as Chief Election Commissioner, with the previous period of service counted as part of the term.

== List of Chief Election Commissioners ==
The following have held the post of the chief election commissioner of Nepal.

No.	Name	Portrait	Term of office		
1	Subarna Shamsher Rana		12 November 1951	1959	7–8 years
2	Surendra Bahadur Basnet		26 September 1966	29 May 1967	245 days
3	Purna Prasad Brahman		23 June 1967	10 August 1971	4 years, 48 days
4	Bishnumani Aacharya		6 September 1971	14 March 1973	1 year, 189 days
5	Sundar Prasad Shah		30 April 1973	2 May 1979	6 years, 2 days
6	Sher Bahadur Shahi		13 January 1980	20 January 1985	5 years, 7 days
7	Surya Prasad Shrestha		28 March 1985	23 October 1992	7 years, 209 days
8	Bishnu Pratap Shah		26 April 1993	3 August 2001	8 years, 99 days
9	Achyut Narayan Rajbhandari		7 January 2002	23 August 2003	1 year, 228 days
10	Keshav Raj Rajbhandari		3 December 2003	9 July 2006	2 years, 218 days
11	Bhojraj Pokharel		30 October 2006	3 June 2009	2 years, 216 days
12	Nilkantha Upreti		24 March 2013	15 May 2015	2 years, 52 days
13	Ayodhi Prasad Yadav		12 July 2015	24 February 2019	3 years, 227 days
14	Dinesh Kumar Thapaliya		19 April 2019	18 April 2025	5 years, 364 days
15	Man Bahadur Karki		31 July 2026	Incumbent	39 days
