= Sindhuligadhi War Museum =

War museum in Nepal

- सिन्धुलीगढी युद्व संग्रहालय
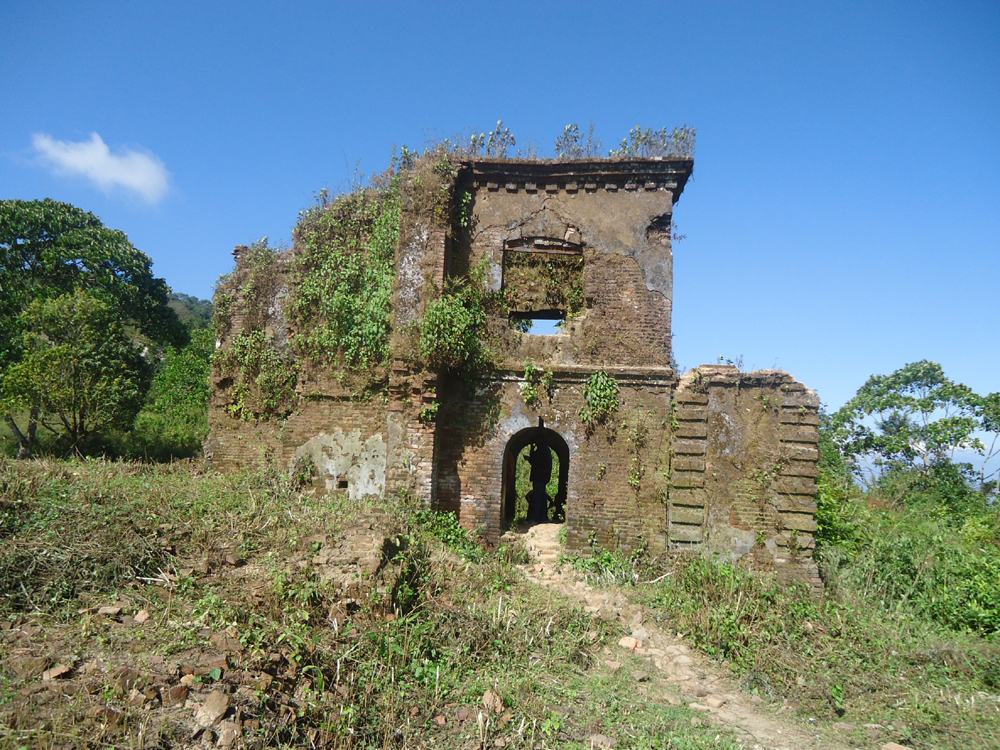
- Ruins of the Sindhuligadhi fort
- Established: 28 July 2021
- Location: Kamalamai, Sindhuli, Bagmati Province
- Coordinates: 27.280756567791624°N 85.95538172276788°E
- Type: War museum
- Owner: Kamalamai Municipality, Sindhuli

Sindhuligadhi War Museum (Nepali:सिन्धुलीगढी युद्व संग्रहालय) is the first war museum of Nepal. It is located in Kamalamai Municipality. It was inaugurated in 2021 by the president of Nepal. The museum was constructed at a cost of NPR 65 million and has a floor area of 6274 square feet.

The museum houses artefacts and weapons used during the Battle of Sindhuli (1767), in which the British army was defeated by the Gurkha army. It also displays war scenes and documentaries. The museum also houses Mithila art, historical documents and a library.

== See also ==
- Sindhuli Gadhi, the fort where the Battle of Sindhuli was fought
- List of museums in Nepal
