= Nilkantha Upreti =

12th Chief Election Commissioner of Nepal

- नीलकण्ठ उप्रेती
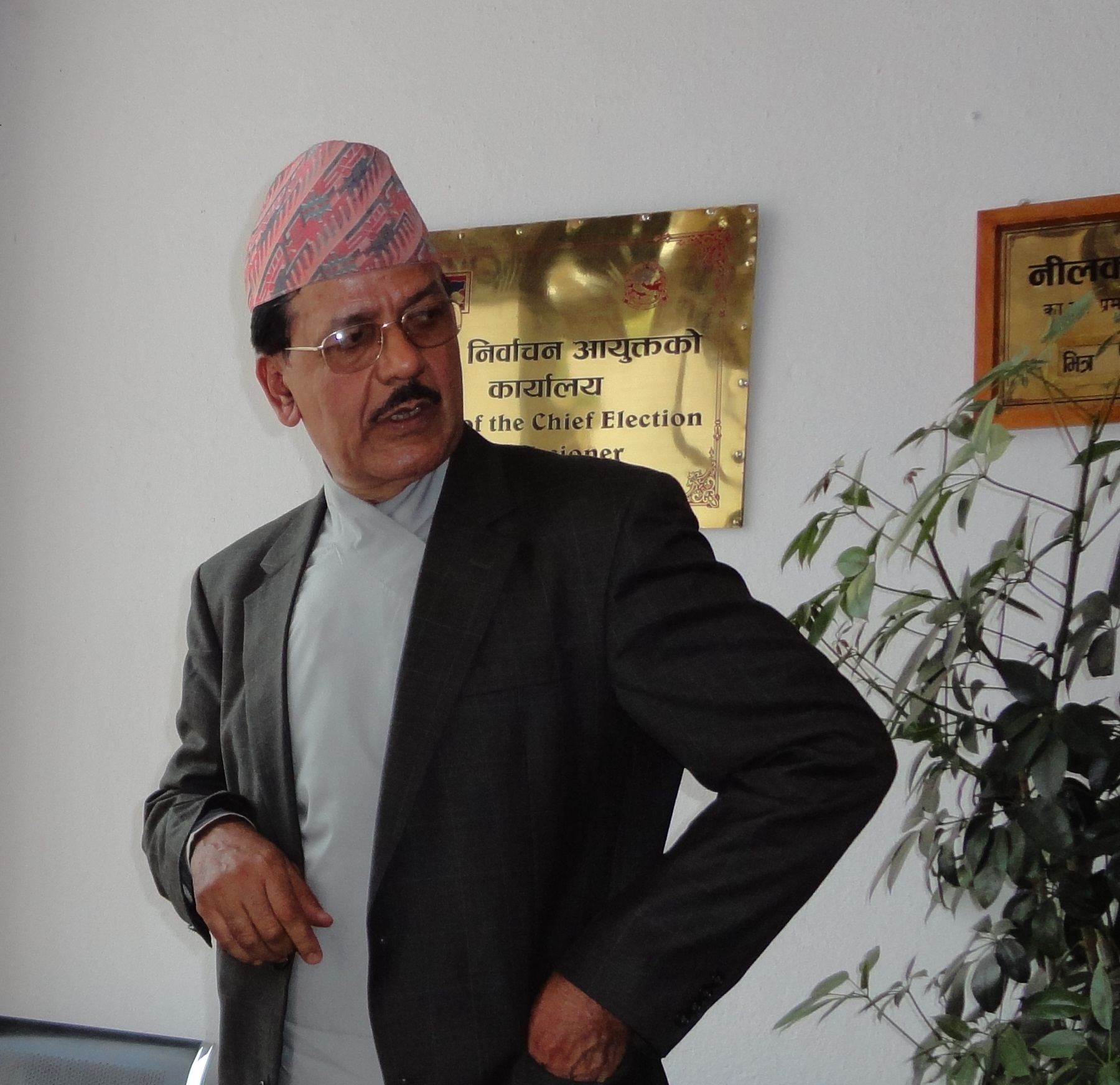

Chief Election Commissioner of Nepal
- In office 24 March 2013 – 15 May 2015
- Preceded by: Bhojraj Pokharel
- Succeeded by: Ayodhee Prasad Yadav

Nilkantha Upreti is Nepalese electoral expert who has served as a commissioner of Election Commission Nepal, during the 2008 Constituent Assembly elections and was later appointed as the Chief Election Commissioner, leading the commission through the critical 2013 Constituent Assembly.
