= Senas of Makwanpur =

Former kingdom in the Mithila region of Nepal

Senas of Makwanpur मकवानपुर
- 1518–1762
- Capital: Makwanpur
- Common languages: Maithili (Official language)
- Religion: Hinduism
- Historical era: Early-modern Nepal
  - Established: 1518
  - Disestablished: 1762
Succeeded by
Kingdom of Nepal

The Senas of Makwanpur was a kingdom located in the northern parts of the Mithila region of Nepal. For a part of their history, up till 1675, they were subordinate to the Rajas of Darbhanga and paid tribute to them. They were later conquered in 1762 by Prithvi Narayan Shah during his unification of Nepal military campaign in the battle of Makwanpur. In that battle, 60 Gorkhali and 400 soldiers of Makwanpur were killed.

The official language of the Sen kings of Makwanpur was Maithili.

== Origins ==
After the fall of the Sena dynasty in Bengal, it is believed that their descendants proceeded to different parts of the country. It is believed that one family settled in the northern parts of Mithila. The Makwanpur family was founded by a member of the Sena family called Mukunda Sen who originally settled in Rupanagar in modern-day Saptari district in the first half of the 13th century. He slowly expanded his rule until he reached the Makwanpur region. The kingdom was expanded towards Palpa and afterwards reached the region of Rajapur, Tanahun, Lama, Pyuthan, Madariya, Darchha, Risinga, Vinayakpur, and Gulmi. The King, Hariharsena, who ruled from 1631 to 1672 adorned himself with the title of Hindupati after capturing the territory of Gondavara which was under a Muslim Nawab.

== Administration ==
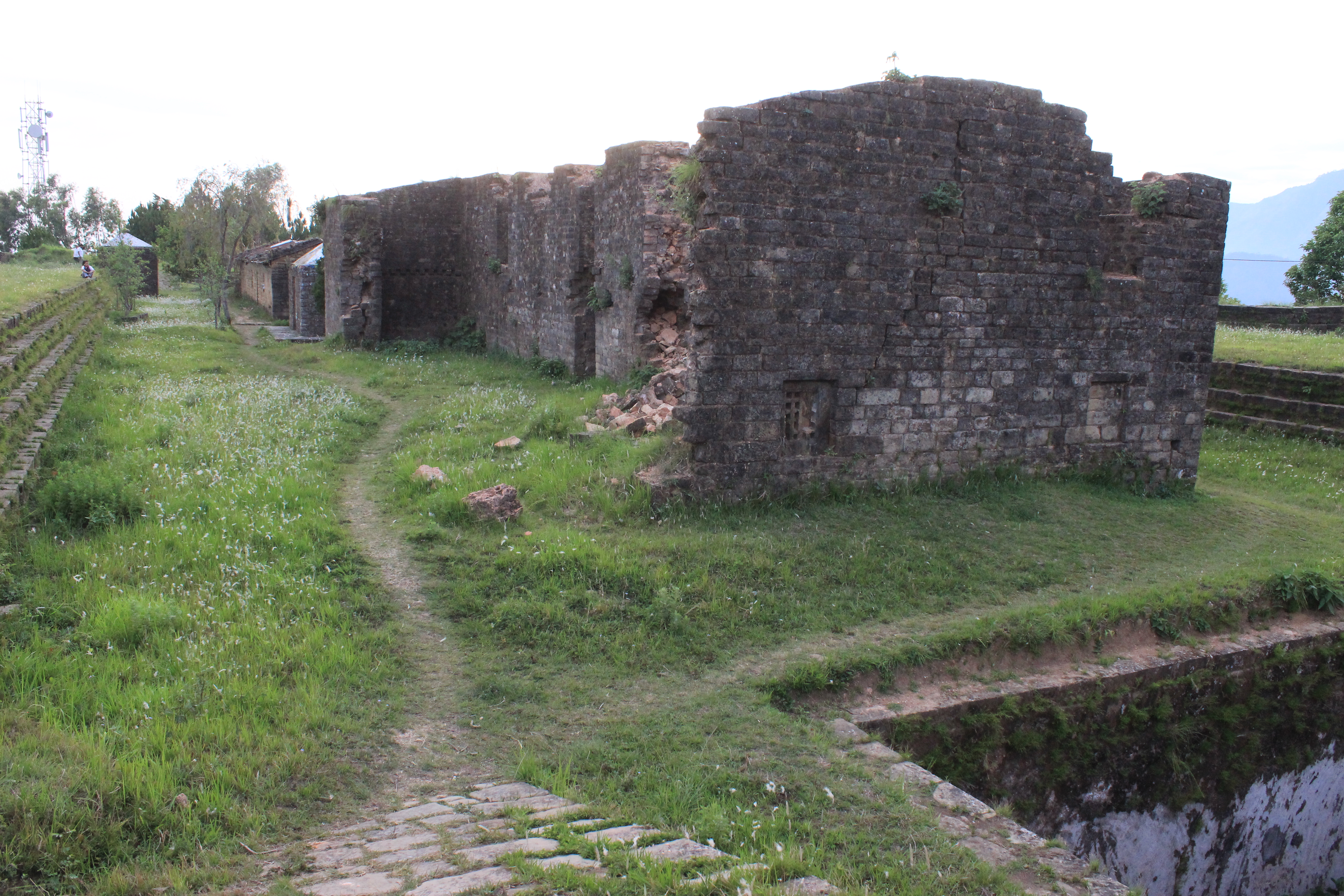
Ruins of Makwanpur Fort

Starting during the reign of Mukunda Sen II, the Makwanpur kingdom fragmented into smaller autonomous principalities ruled by members of the Sen dynasty. These smaller principalities included the regions of Palpa and Vijaypur.

The administrative setup of Makwanpur was influenced by the Mughal Empire of India with varying levels of administration ranging from Central Administration to village administration.

== Inscription of Jagatasena ==
An inscription belonging to the Makwanpur prince, Jagatasena, was discovered in Janakpur at the Janaki Ram monastery and throws light on the economic condition of the state. The inscription reads:

The desistance paper is given through Sri Mahinath Pajiyar, place Janakpur, Praganna Korari, Further, the settlement of the monastery failed which was made by our ancestor. Then the head-priest Harinarayan Das called us and said to maintain the glorious monastery of ancestor. But we had no capability to do, so we wrote the desistance paper. In future, if any altercations from our side occurs, that will be false. It is dated Samvat 1789 Sal Push Sudi 15 place Janakpur. Signature made by Janatasena, Thakur Patwari, Witness Nanhku Raut and Ram Mandal and Mangaru Ran and Bechu Mandai residents of Janakpur Praganna Korari.

The inscription details that the Makwanpur kingdom is unable to provide financial assistance to the Janaki Ram monastery.
