= Battle of Makwanpur (1763) =

1763 battle

| Date | 20 January 1763 |
| Location | Makwanpurgadhi, Gorkha Kingdom (today part of Makwanpurgadhi, Bagmati Province, Nepal) |
| Result | Gorkhali victory |

Belligerents
| Gorkha Kingdom | Nawab of Bengal |

Commanders and leaders
| Prithvi Narayan Shah | Mir Qasim; Gurgin Khan |

Strength
| Unknown | 3,500 troops |

Battle of Makwanpur was fought on 20 January 1763 in Makwanpurgadhi, Gorkha Kingdom between the Gorkhas and the Nawab of Bengal. The Muslims fled Makwanpur, resulted in Gorkhali victory, and the first victory of Gorkhas against overseas soldiers.

== Background ==
Prithvinarayana, the ruler of Gorkha, aimed to economically isolate the Kathmandu Valley. By 1762, he controlled both the eastern and western trade routes to Lhasa from the valley. Additionally, he conquered strategic locations such as Makwanpur, Timalkot, Sindhuli, and Hariharpur on the Mahabharat range southwest of the valley, effectively blocking the southern routes to India. This blockade imposed economic restrictions on the valley, aligning with Prithvinarayana's objectives.

== Clash ==
Prithvinarayana's actions led to clashes with external forces. Firstly, Ali Mir Kasim, the Nawab of Bengal, was incited by Digbandhan Sena, the displaced ruler of Makwanpur and Prithvinarayana's first wife's brother, to attack the Gorkha stronghold in Makwanpur. In response, Prithvinarayana engaged Mir Kasim's general, Gurgin Khan, at Makwanpur, where he decisively defeated the advancing troops and forced them to retreat.

This event underscored Prithvinarayana's military prowess and determination to maintain control over strategic territories, thereby securing his position and objectives in the region.
