= Prithvipati Shah =

King of Gorkha Kingdom from 1673 to 1716

- Posthumous painting of Prithvipati Shah

King of Gorkha
- Reign: 1673–1716
- Predecessor: Rudra Shah
- Successor: Nara Bhupal Shah
- Issue: Birbhadra Shah; Chandrarup Shah
- Dynasty: Shah dynasty
- Father: Rudra Shah
- Religion: Hinduism

Prithvipati Shah (Nepali: पृथ्वीपति शाह) was King of the Gorkha Kingdom. He was the grandfather of Nara Bhupal Shah and reigned from 1673–1716.

King Prithvipati Shah ascended to the throne after the demise of his father Rudra Shah. He was the longest serving king of the Gorkha Kingdom but his reign saw a lot of struggles.
