= Dal Mardan Shah =

King of Patan from 1764 to 1765

King of Patan
- Reign: 1764–1765
- Predecessor: Ranajit Malla
- Successor: Tej Narasimha Malla
- Dynasty: Shah Dynasty
- Father: Nara Bhupal Shah

Dal Mardan Shah or Dalmardana Shah, was a king of the Malla state of Patan in Nepal (r. 1764–1765). He was a son of Nara Bhupal Shah and the younger brother of Prithvi Narayan Shah. He led one of the troop when Prithivi Narayan Shah made second attack against Nuwakot. Dalmardan Shah sworded Sankhamani Rana (leader of Nuwakot troops) at the age of only 12.
