= Makwanpur Gadhi =

Fort in Nepal

- मकवानपुरगढी
- Makwanpur, Bagmati Province in Nepal
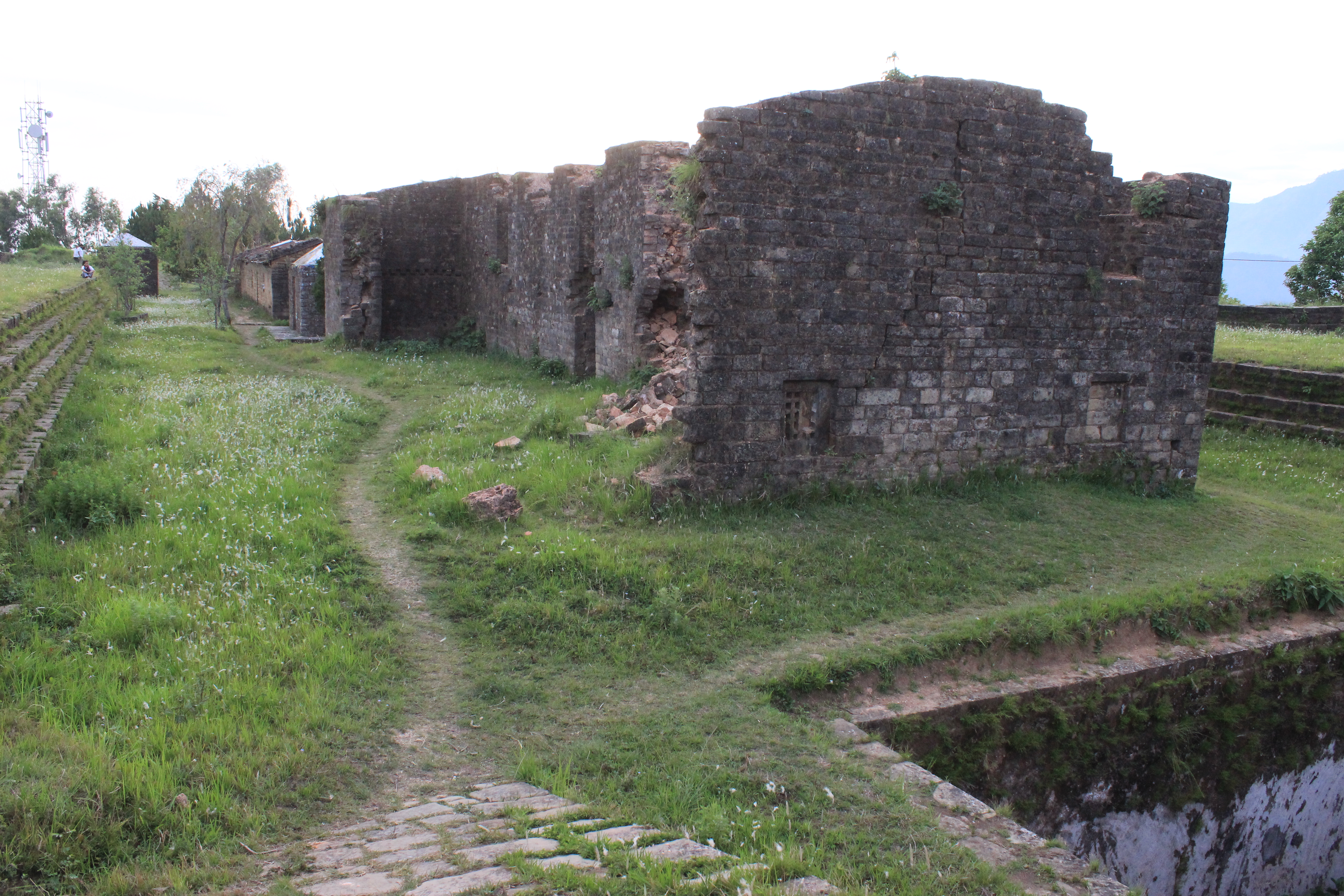
- Makwanpur Gadhi 2015

Site information
- Type: Fort

Location
- Coordinates: 27.41102715615202°N 85.14750799325314°E

The Makwanpur Gadhi (Nepali: मकवानपुरगढी) is a fort in Makwanpur District, Bagmati Province.

The Battle of Makwanpur (1762), the Battle of Makwanpur (1763), and the Battle of Makwanpur (1816) were fought in this fort.

In 2015, the Government of Nepal issued stamps featuring the Makwanpur Gadhi.
