= Battle of Makwanpur (1816) =

- Part of the Anglo-Nepalese War
Date	28 February 1816
Location	Makwanpurgadhi, Kingdom of Nepal (today part of Makwanpurgadhi, Bagmati Province, Nepal) 27°24′41″N 85°8′53″E
Result	British victory

Belligerents
Kingdom of Nepal	East India Company

Commanders and leaders
Ranabir Singh Thapa	Bennet Marley

Strength
Unknown	3,500 troops
- Location within Bagmati Province Makwanpur (Nepal)

Battle of Makwanpur was fought on 28 February 1816 in Makwanpurgadhi, Nepal between Nepal and the East India Company. It resulted in British victory.
