= Battle of Sindhuli =

1767 war between Gorkha Kingdom and East India Company

- Part of the Unification of Nepal
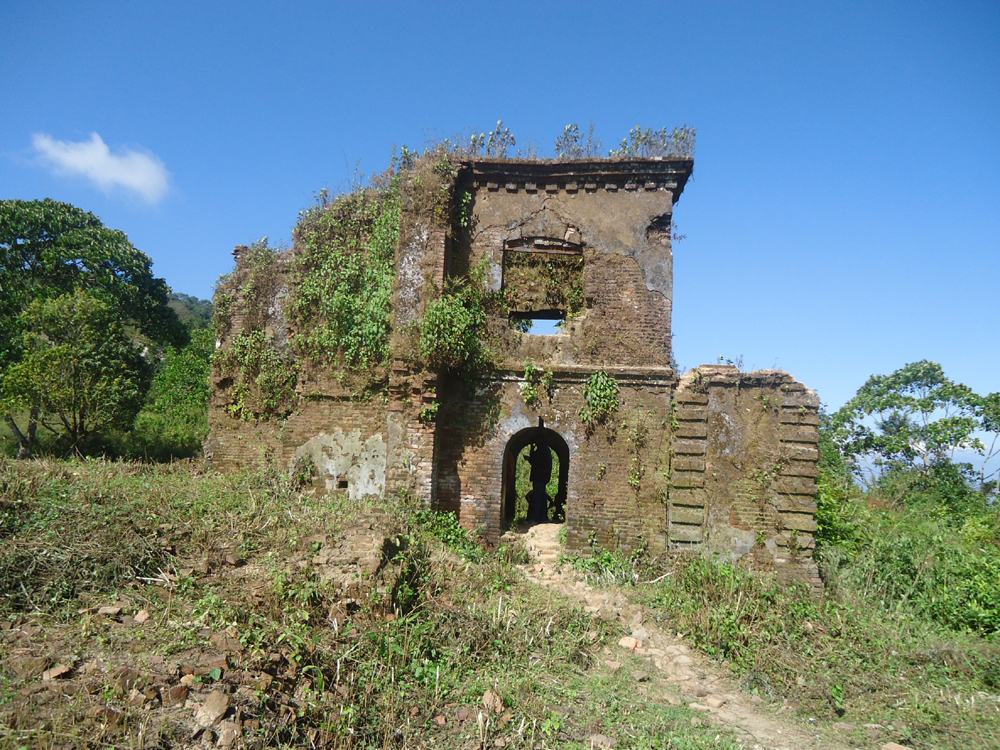
- The ruins of Sindhuli Gadhi
Date	6 November 1767
Location	Sindhuli Gadhi, Kingdom of Nepal (present day Sindhuli District, Bagmati Province, Nepal) 27.2806°N 85.95501°E
Result	Gorkhali victory

Belligerents
Kingdom of Gorkha	East India Company; Kingdom of Kantipur

Commanders and leaders
Prithvi Narayan Shah	Jaya Prakash Malla; Captain Kinloch
- Location within Bagmati Province Sindhuli Gadhi (Nepal)

The Battle of Sindhuli (Nepali: सिन्धुलीको युद्ध; also known as the Battle of Sindhuli Gadhi) was fought on 6 November 1767 near Sindhuli Gadhi. The battle was part of the unification of Nepal led by Prithvi Narayan Shah, King of Gorkha (later King of Nepal).

== Background ==
=== Unification campaign ===
Before the unification, Nepal was divided into many various petty kingdoms, notability Baise rajyas (22 kingdoms) in the west, Chaubisi Rajyas (24 kingdoms) in the Gandaki region, Malla Kingdoms in the Kathmandu Valley, and other kingdoms to extending to Sikkim. Gorkha, an Independent kingdom in Gandaki, was founded in 1559 by Dravya Shah, the second son of Yasho Brahma Shah, King of Kaski and Lamjung. In 1739, King Nara Bhupal Shah, launched an attack on Nuwakot, a territory controlled by Malla kings and Gorkhalis lost the war. Once again, he launched another attack with help from Kantipur and Patan(now known as Kathmandu, and Lalitpur respectively), and Gorkhas were ultimately defeated.

On 3 April 1743, 20-year-old, Prithvi Narayan Shah ascended the throne of the Gorkha after the death of his father Nara Bhupal Shah. Like his father, he attacked Nuwakot in 1742 and he suffered another defeat so Shah realised he needed more military technology and manpower to capture Nuwakot. Shah acquired weapons from Banaras, created alliances with other kingdoms, increased the manpower, and started the assault on 26 September 1744. This time Gorkhalis won the war which resulted in Nuwakot ceding from Malla Kings and subsequently started the unification of Nepal campaign. As Gorkhas were continuing their expansion, Jaya Prakash Malla, King of Kantipur requested assistance from the East India Company because he did not see other ways to stop them. Thomas Rumbold, head of the company in Patna advised Shah to remove the blockade of Kantipur and abstain from attacking Malla or else it could result in a war. Rumbold not receiving any positive response from Prithvi Narayan Shah led to the Battle of Sindhuli.

=== Trade route ===
During the reign of Gorkha's Ram Shah and Kantipur's Pratap Malla, both gained control of important areas in Tibet's border crossing areas where most of the trans-Himalayan trade occurred. Shah invaded Tibet around c. 1625-1630, the first attack was unsuccessful however the second strike proved to be successful which gained control of Kerong and went far as Kukurghat, north of Kerong. War ended with Gorkha signing a treaty with Tibet which gave Shah access to the main trade route. This created a problem for Kantipur as their traders used the same route, Malla did not fight for Kerong but he gained access to Kuti, second important route. He also signed a treaty, which created a monopoly for their traders as the trade between India and Tibet was extremely profitable, and the king also profited from the coins minted for their government. East India Company carried their trades to Tibet and China from Kathmandu, and they came in conflict with the Gorkhas because Prithvi Narayan Shah's blockade of Kantipur which affected them.

=== Terrain ===
Sindhuli Gadhi is located 4,648 feet above the sea level and it is about 150-kilometre away from Kathmandu.
