= Birbhadra Shah =

- Prince (Yubarajdhiraj) of Gorkha
- Posthumous painting of Birbhadra Shah
- Born: Gorkha Kingdom
- Died: 1697 near Trishuli River
- Issue: Nara Bhupal Shah
- Dynasty: Shah dynasty
- Father: Prithvipati Shah

Birbhadra Shah (died c. 1697) was the crown prince of the Gorkha state in Nepal. He was the son of Prithvipati Shah and the father of Nara Bhupal Shah. Birbhadra died while returning from Bhaktapur to Gorkha.
