= Nara Bhupal Shah =

King of Gorkha Kingdom from 1716 to 1743

Narabhupal Shah नरभूपाल शाह
- Posthumous painting of Nara Bhupal Shah

King of Gorkha
- Reign: 1716 – 3 April 1743
- Coronation: 1716
- Predecessor: Prithvipati Shah
- Successor: Prithvi Narayan Shah
- Born: circa 1697; Gorkha Darbar, Gorkha Kingdom (present day Gorkha District, Nepal)
- Died: 3 April 1743; Nepal
- Spouse: Chandraprabhawati Devi; Kaushalyavati Devi; Buddhimati Subhadramati
- Issue: Prithvi Narayan, King of Gorkha and Nepal; Brindakeshar Shah; Dal Mardan, King of Patan; Mahoddam Kirti Shah; Surapratap Shah; Daljit Shah
- Dynasty: Shah dynasty
- Father: Birbhadra Shah
- Mother: Malikavati Devi
- Religion: Hinduism

Nara Bhupal Shah (Nepali: नरभूपाल शाह; 1697–1743) was a king of the Gorkha Kingdom, which lies in modern day Nepal; and the father of Prithvi Narayan Shah. Nara Bhupal Shah was the son of Birbhadra Shah, the grandson of Prithvipati Shah. He was the king of the Gorkha state in Nepal. He unsuccessfully tried to extend his kingdom by capturing Nuwakot.

After his death, his eldest son, Prithvi Narayan Shah, annexed Nuwakot and even the Kathmandu Valley, in his conquest of a unified Nepal. His father died before his grandfather, so after his grandfather's death, he became the king. Nara Bhupal became the king in 1716 AD.

Preceded by Prithvipati Shah	King of Gorkha; 1716–1743	Succeeded by Prithvi Narayan Shah
