= Prithvi Narayan Shah =

King of Nepal from 1768 to 1775

- Parbat-kai-Badshah (Note: In The Gorkha Conquests: The Process and Consequences of the Unification of Nepal, it is mentioned that Prithvi Narayan Shah styled himself as "Parbat-kai-Badshah" ("Emperor of the Mountains") over the Himalayan hill regions during the Gorkha expansion.); Haindava Dharmoddharak (Note: In his famous divine counsel Divyopadesh, Prithvi Narayan Shah proclaimed the unified realm as "Asal Hindustan" ("True Land of Hindus") to distinguish it from foreign influenced plains, establishing himself as a defender and protector of Hindu faith and traditions.); Shri Panch Badamaharajadhiraja Sarkar
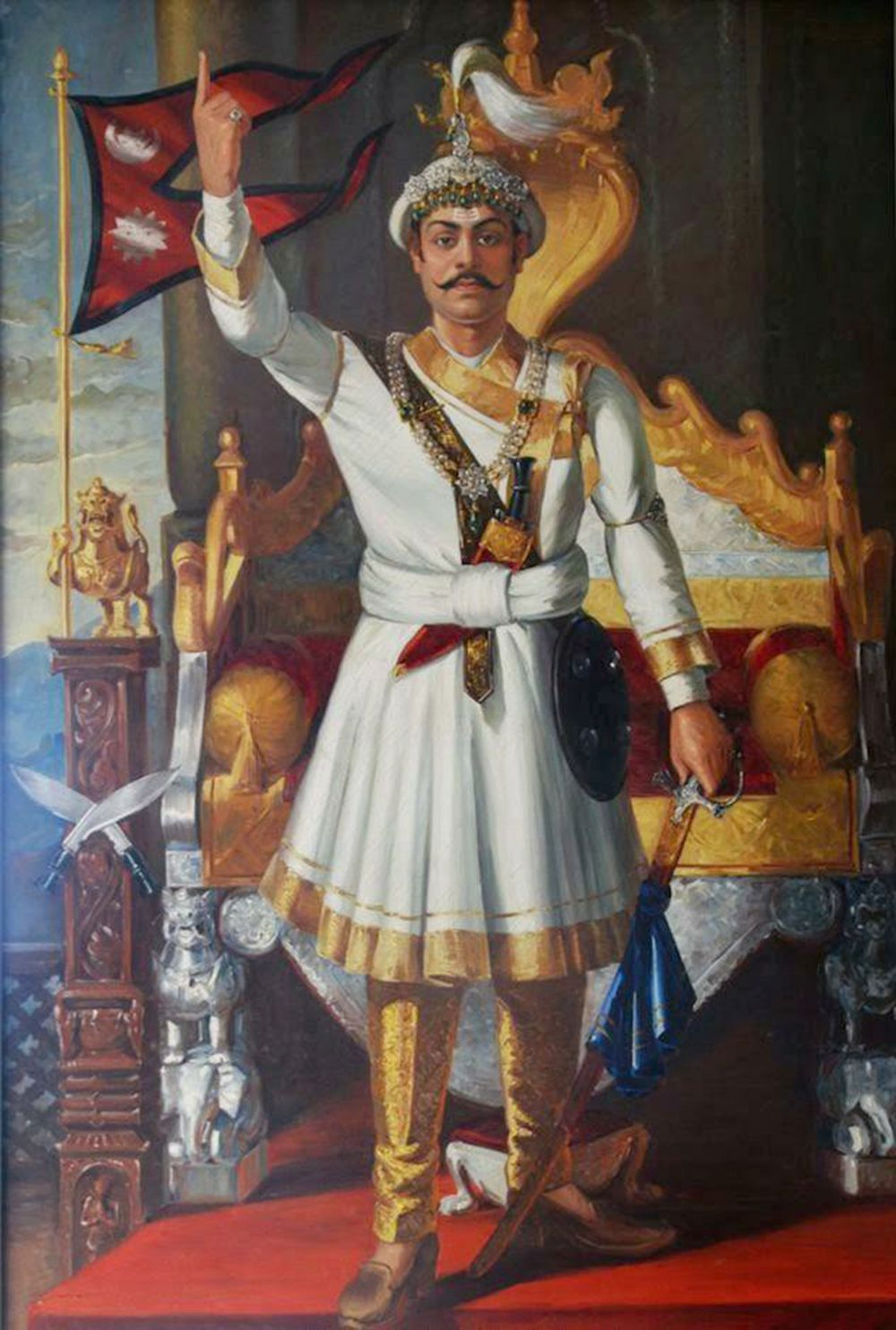

King of Nepal
- Reign: 25 September 1768 – 11 January 1775
- Coronation: 25 September 1768
- Predecessor: Monarchy established (himself as King of Gorkha)
- Successor: Pratap Singh Shah

King of Gorkha
- Reign: 3 April 1743 – 25 September 1768
- Coronation: 3 April 1743
- Predecessor: Nara Bhupal Shah
- Successor: Monarchy abolished (himself as King of Nepal)
- Born: 27 December 1722; Gorkha Durbar, Kingdom of Gorkha (present-day Gorkha District, Nepal)
- Died: 11 January 1775 (aged 52); Devighat, Kingdom of Nepal (present-day Nuwakot District, Nepal)
- Spouses: Indira Kumari Devi (m. 1738; died 1775) Narendra RL Devi (m. 1740; died 1775)
- Issue: Pratap Singh Shah; Bedum Shah; Bahadur Shah; Bilas Kumari; Narayan Shah; Bishnu Shah
- Dynasty: Shah
- Father: Nara Bhupal
- Mother: Kaushalyavati Devi
- Religion: Hinduism

Shri Panch Prithvi Narayan Shah (Note: Pronounced /prɪθ.viː nɑː.rɑː.jən ʃɑːh/; Nepali: पृथ्वीनारायण शाह, pronounced [pɾɪtʰʋi naːɾaːjʌɳ ʃaːh]; transliterated as Pṛthvī Nārāyaṇa Śāha.) (Nepali: पृथ्वीनारायण शाह; 7 January 1723 – 11 January 1775) was the last monarch of the Gorkha Kingdom and the founding monarch of the unified Kingdom of Nepal, also referred to as the Gorkha Empire. He is credited with initiating the Unification of Nepal and relocating Kathmandu as the royal capital. He ruled Gorkha from 1743 to 1768 and Nepal from 1768 until his death in 1775. Through a series of strategic conquests, systemic economic blockades, and fragile political alliances, he expanded Gorkha's territory and laid the sovereign framework of modern Nepal.

Prithvi Narayan Shah played a central role in the formation of modern Nepal through his campaigns to unite different small kingdoms under one rule. He is considered a foundational titan in Nepalese history. His efforts to unify the fractured country and build a shared political identity earned him the historic title "Father of the Nation" and "King of Kings".

Scholars have drawn comparisons between his nation-building role and that of George Washington in the United States or Otto von Bismarck in Germany, citing his macro-regional vision and military leadership within the volatile context of 18th-century South Asia. His legacy remains deeply influential in Nepal's contemporary geopolitical, political, and cultural discourse.

== Early years ==
Prithvi Narayan Shah was born prematurely on 7 January 1723 as the first child of Nara Bhupal Shah and Kaushalyavati Devi in the Gorkha Palace.

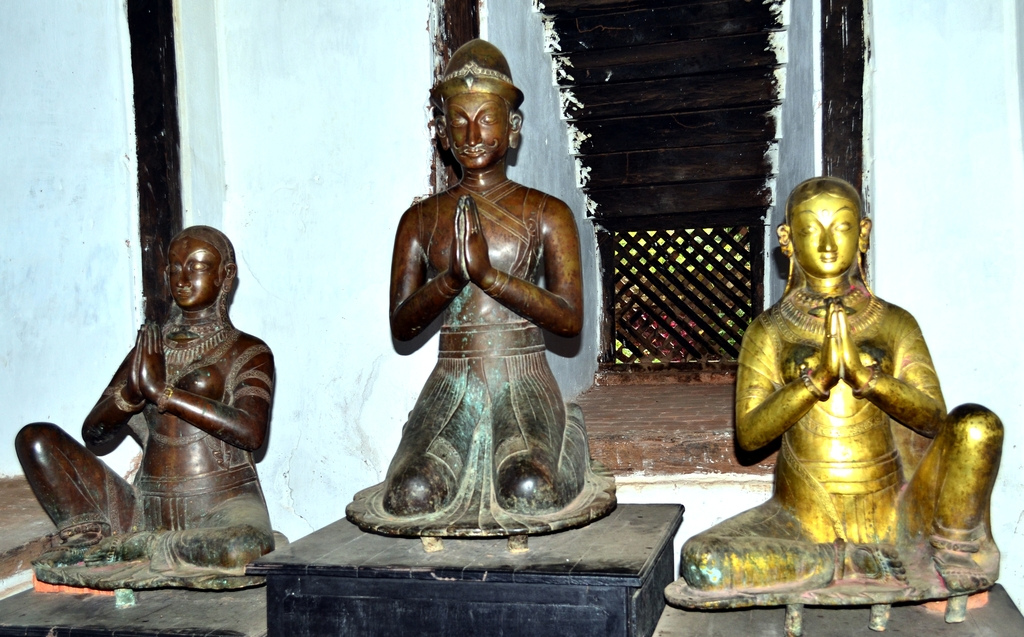
Statues of Prithvi Narayan Shah and his two wives, Indira Kumari Devi and Narendra Rajya Laxmi Devi.

Prince Prithvi Narayan Shah's education began at age five through standard palace rituals. At that time, the responsibility to educate him was given to Mokchyeshwor Aryal and Bhanu Aryal. They were the Brahmins who worked in the palace as astrologers, where they were also known as Jyotishi or Jaisi.

Even though the Gurus provided his primary education, the duty of developing his character was taken on by Queen Chandra Pravawati. It is documented that seeing the princes of neighboring states Tanahun, Lamjung, and Kaski indulge in excess pleasure, Chandra Pravawati deliberately isolated Prithvi Narayan Shah from comfortable or hedonistic pursuits. That is why no traces of pleasurable diversions can be found in his early life. Narbhupal Shah wanted him to marry a strong family so that it would assist him if needed. The best prospect of marriage that he saw fit was with the Kingdom of Makwanpur. Shah had turned 14 in 1737 C.E. and it was decided that he would marry Indra Kumari Devi, the daughter of Hemkarna Sen, the Princess of Makwanpur in Pre-Unification Nepal.

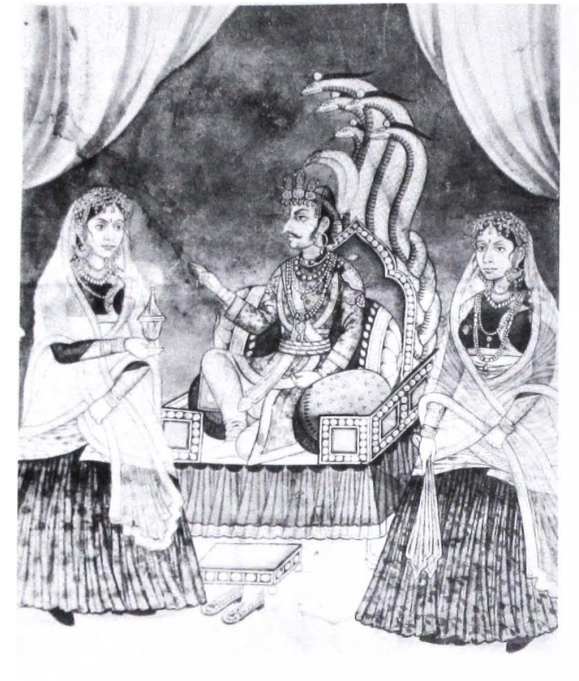
A portrait traditionally believed to depict Prithvi Narayan Shah, though some sources suggest it may represent one of his descendants.

From a young age, he took an interest in the affairs of his father's state and soon began to take on administrative responsibilities. Prithvi Narayan Shah had an early dream of conquering Nuwakot, partially because his father had lost it to the Mallas of Kathmandu in an earlier military disaster.

After the death of his father in 1743 AD, Prithvi Narayan Shah ascended to the throne of Gorkha at the age of 20. As a king, he valued his people and enjoyed talking to them about their general concerns. This practice helped him to build a rapport with his people and helped him to understand the requirements of the citizens of Gorkha. King Shah sealed his borders and maintained a friendly diplomatic relationship with his immediate hill neighbors, with the exception of the East India Company, which ignored Nepal and refused to open equitable trade relations at the time.

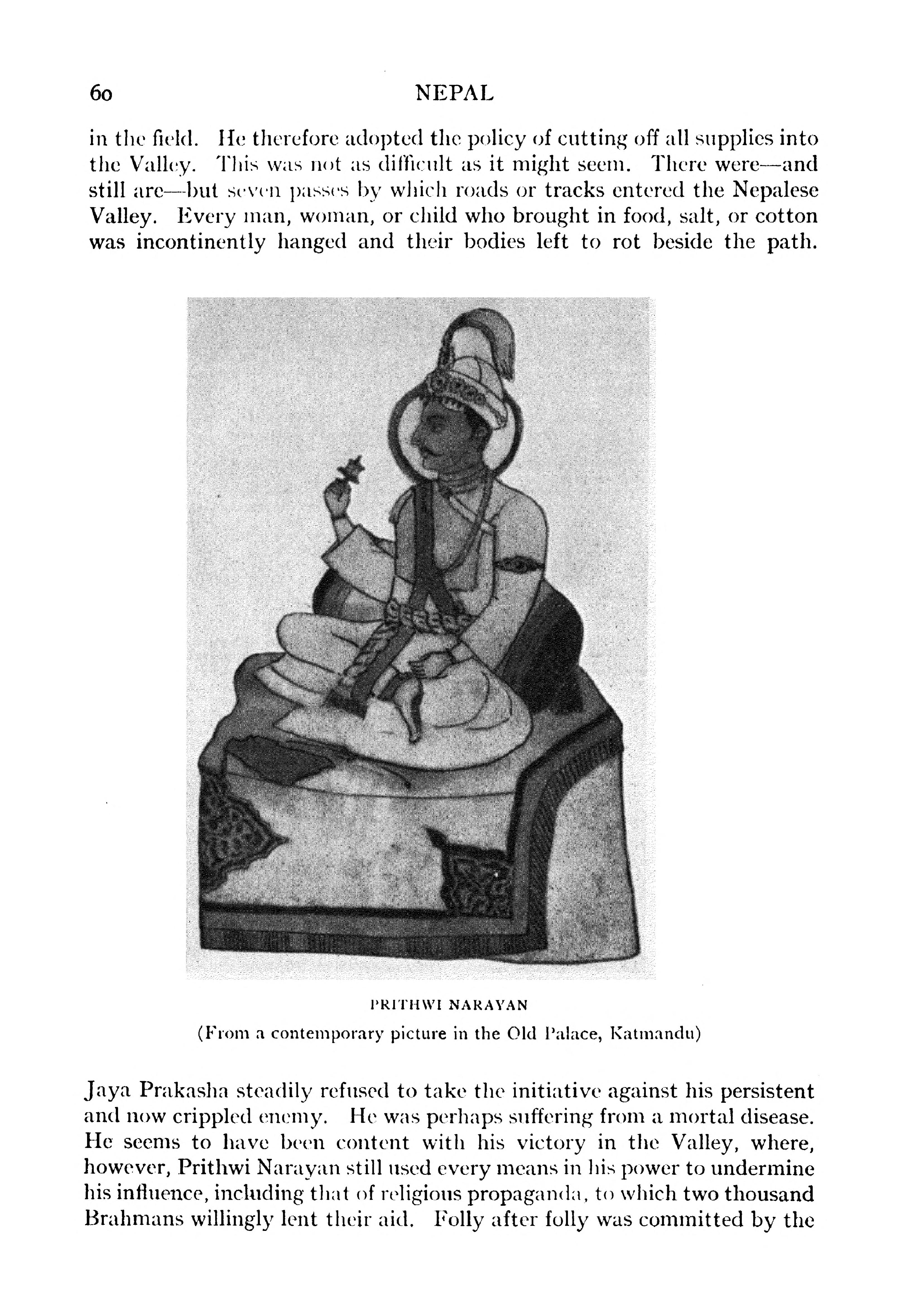
Contemporary painting of King Prithvi Narayan Shah, preserved in the Old Palace, Kathmandu.

== Reign and military career ==
Before Prithvi Narayan Shah's unification movement, there were a total of 54 states in Nepal. The 54 states were named as Baisi Rajya and Chaubise Rajya. In the South-Eastern Terai, there were three Sen states: Makawanpur, Bijayapur, and Chaudandi. In the West, from Gorkha (includes parts west of Trishuli from present day Dhading) to Gandaki Province, there were 24 states. In the province of Karnali, there were 22 states with Kalyan, Samaal, Shahi and Chand dynasties. Along with Gorkha and Mustang, Bhaktapur, Kantipur and Lalitpur made up the remaining five states.

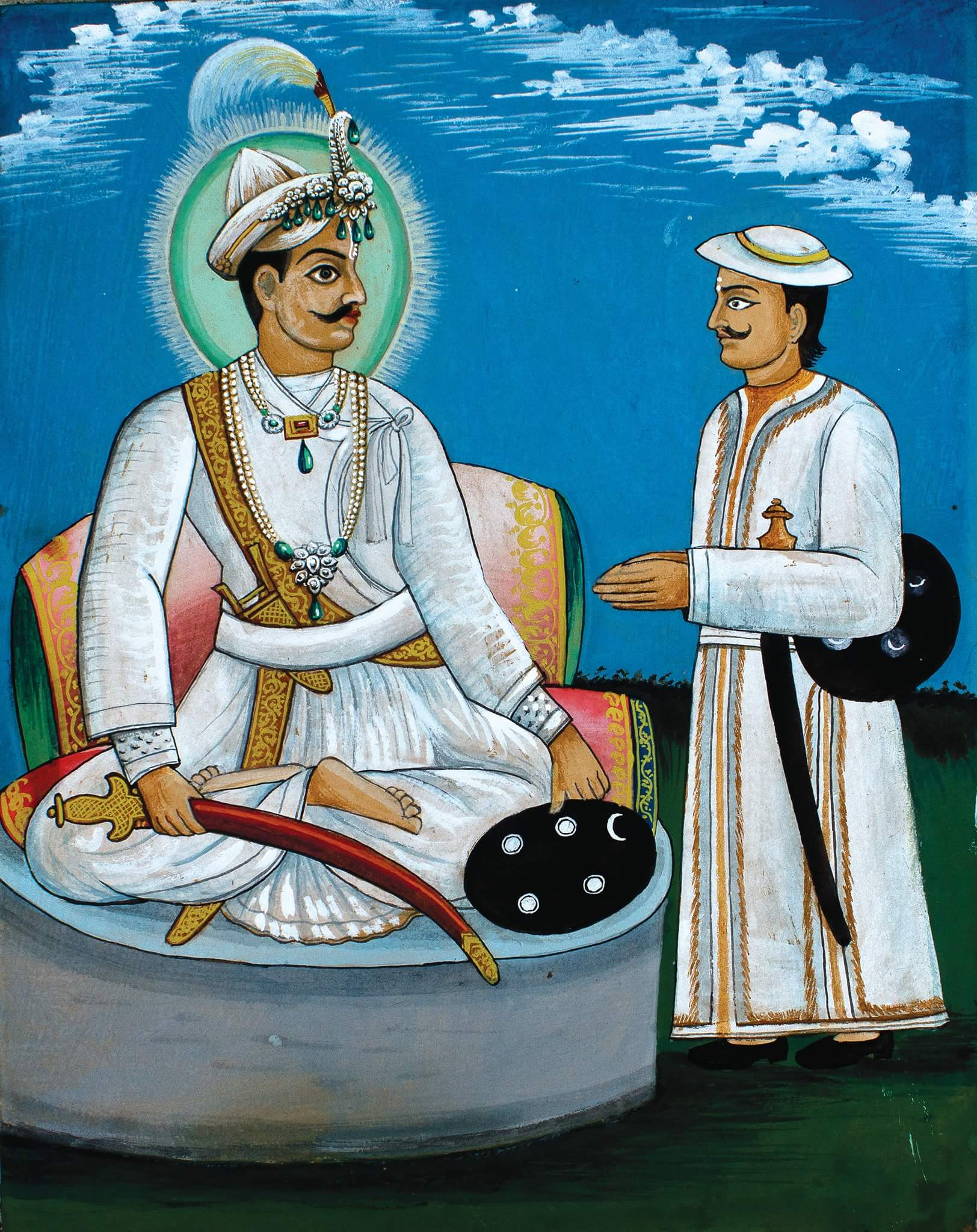
Prithvi Narayan Shah consulting with his first Army Chief (Senapati) Shivaram Singh Basnyat.

When Prithvi Narayan Shah ascended to the throne of Gorkha on 3 April 1743 A.D., it was still a minor regional power. He then started to contemplate the methods for turning Gorkha into a vast and strong state. He went incognito to Varanasi to gain first-hand knowledge about the neighbouring states and about India to the south. During those days, Varanasi was one of the largest trade centres in India where people from different places gathered. He met with different strata of people and gained valuable understandings regarding the political and social vulnerabilities of the Indian Sub-Continent. In Varanasi, his father-in-law Abhiman Singh, a Thakuri Chief, procured for him some firearms and a quantity of modern ammunition.

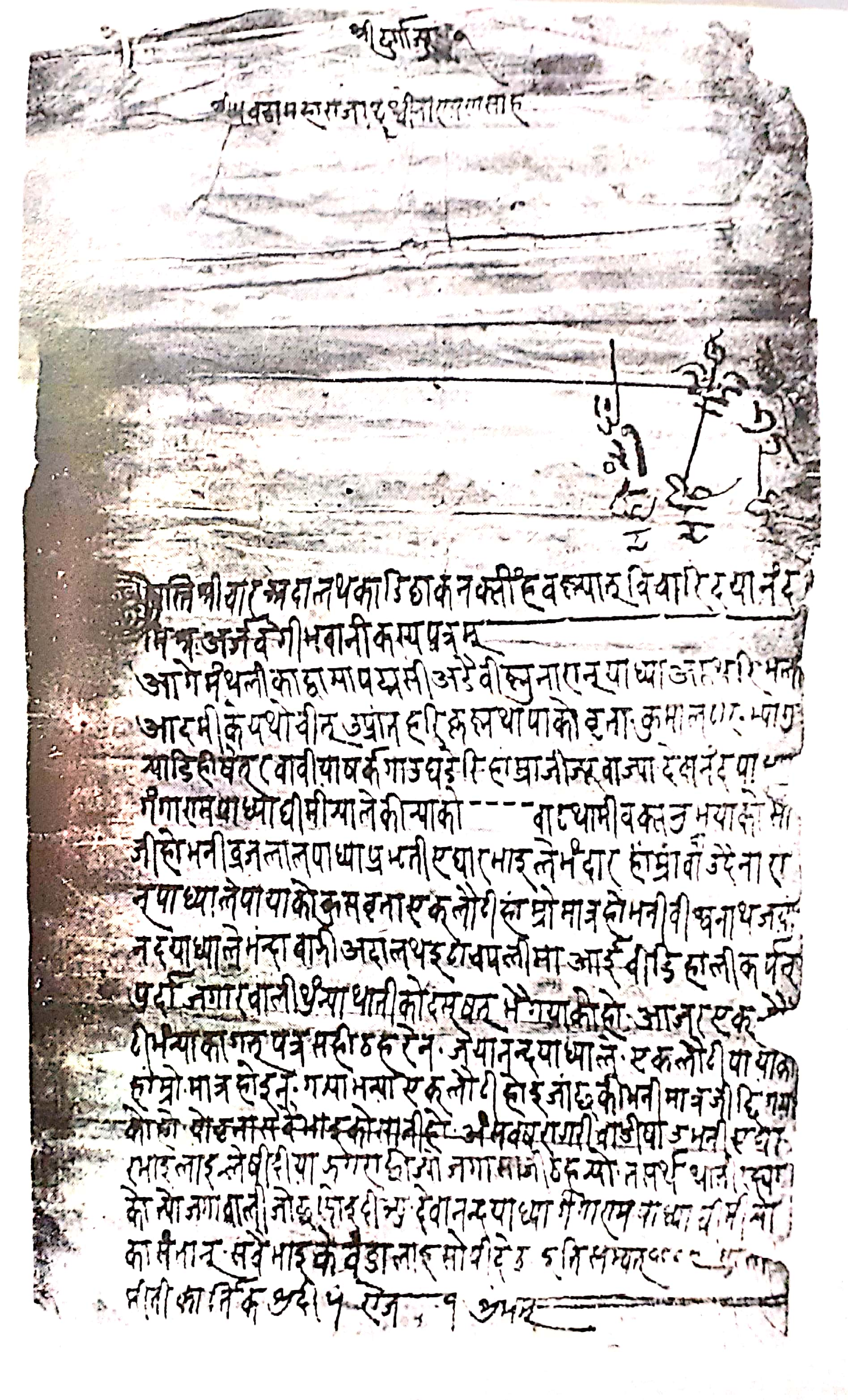
A historical Sanskrit manuscript addressed to King Prithvi Narayan Shah, illustrating the formal communication practices and Brahmanical influence during his reign.

=== Nuwakot ===
His first attempt at invasion of Nuwakot in 1743 CE failed and his reign began with an immediate military defeat. Conquering Nuwakot was essential for the unification, as it lay directly between Kathmandu and the Gorkha District, making it a vital commercial gateway to Tibet.

On his return to Gorkha from Varanasi, Prithvi Narayan Shah first took steps to isolate Nuwakot in the diplomatic field. He entered into friendly neutral alliances with the rival chiefs of Lamjung, Tanahun and Palpa. This done, Prithvi Narayan Shah sent an army against Nuwakot from three directions. The Chief of Nuwakot Kaji Jayanta Rana Magar (former Kaji of Gorkha) knowing that Gorkha was going to attack them in near future had gone to secure help from Jaya Prakash Malla, the king of Kantipur. Thus Kaji Jayanta Rana Magar's son, Commander of Nuwakot Sankha Mani Rana Magar, commanded the Nuwakot army representing his father. The Nuwakot army was routed in 1744 CE and the state passed into the hands of Prithvi Narayan Shah's Gorkha.

=== Kirtipur ===
Prithvi Narayan Shah's next strategy was to encircle all the positions around the Nepal valley or Kathmandu, and the neighboring regions, and thereby to create a crippling economic blockade in order that the conquest of Nepal valley might become inevitable. He first attacked Kirtipur, a dependency of Patan and a strategic post commanding the Nepal valley, but was signally defeated in 1757. He made a narrow escape from the battlefield but his trusted commander and prime minister Kalu Pande was killed. Pande's death meant an existential loss to the Gorkhas and it was not until 1763 that they were in a structural position to resume the policy of territorial conquest.

In 1765, Prithvi Narayan Shah attacked Kirtipur again after two humiliating defeats. In Kirtipur, King Prithvi Narayan conquered the ancient city on his third attempt. The ferocity with which the conquerors had dealt with the natives of Kirtipur struck terror into the hearts of the neighbouring people and made the final conquest easier by undermining resistance.

=== Makwanpur ===
In 1763, the Gorkhas conquered Makwanpur, one of the most critical gateways to Nepal from Bengal. The conquest of Makwanpur, however, brought Prithvi Narayan Shah into a violent collision with Mir Qasim, the Nawab of Bengal. Bikram Sen, the king of Makwanpur, was then taken prisoner by Prithvi Narayan Shah. Upon this Kanak Singh, another local Chief complained to Nawab Mir Qasim and requested his armed intervention. In consequence of this complaint, the Nawab crossed over sending Gurgin Khan before him who arrived near Makwanpur where his entire army was systematically ambushed and destroyed, forcing the Nawab to return to Patna. The expedition of Qasim was also determined by Gurgin Khan's eagerness to test the strength and skill of the troops whom he had disciplined and of the artillery which he had trained. Gurgin Khan's lust for the legendary Nepalese gold was another cause of his earnestness to lead the expedition, although the Nawab had counselled against it. Gurgin Khan lost a massive portion of his men and had to abandon many stands of modern weapons and artillery to the Gorkhalis.

=== Chaukot ===
The Gorkhalis fought for six months with the people of Dhulikhel. After this Prithvi Narayan Shah built a fort on the top of the hill south of Chaukot and collected a large number of troops. On consulting with his followers, he was told by the kajis that small villages were easily taken, as the people fled when they heard the shouts of the assailants, but the village of Chaukot required advanced tactical skills. After this consultation, the troops blockaded Chaukot. Some of the people fled to Pyuthan by way of Basdol. Narasinha Rai went to Mahindra Sinha Rai and said, "We are unable to cope with the Gorkhalis with the help of fifty houses. The rest of the people have fled, and I have come to tell you. Do not delay but flee soon." Mahindra Sinha reproached him and charged him with cowardice, saying, "Do not stay for me but escape with your lives. As for myself, I will repulse the whole force of the Gorkhalis, and having earned great renown, will enjoy my possession in happiness." Then he called together his faithful followers and prepared for battle.

On the 6th of Jestha (28 May 1757), a severe battle was fought, which lasted from evening until midnight. The Gorkhalis, having lost 131 men, retreated. The battle was renewed daily for fifteen days, without the Gorkhalis making any impression. On the 16th day a hotly contested battle was fought. At this time a soldier, getting behind Mahindra Sinha, killed him with a khoda and a lance and wounded Narasinha in the left shoulder with a Khukuri, due to which he fell senseless to the ground. Seeing this, the Chaukotiyas fled, and the village was set on fire. In this campaign, the Gorkhalis lost 332 men in total.

The next morning Prithvi Narayan Shah inspected the field of battle, and seeing Mahindra Sinha Rai's lifeless body pierced with wounds, he praised his bravery and sent for his family, that they being the relatives of so brave a man, might have proper protection. They were brought and fed in the royal kitchen. After this, having with ease captured five surrounding villages, viz., Panauti, Banepa, Nala, Khadpu, and Sanga, Prithvi Narayan Shah returned to Nuwakot.

=== Kathmandu Valley ===
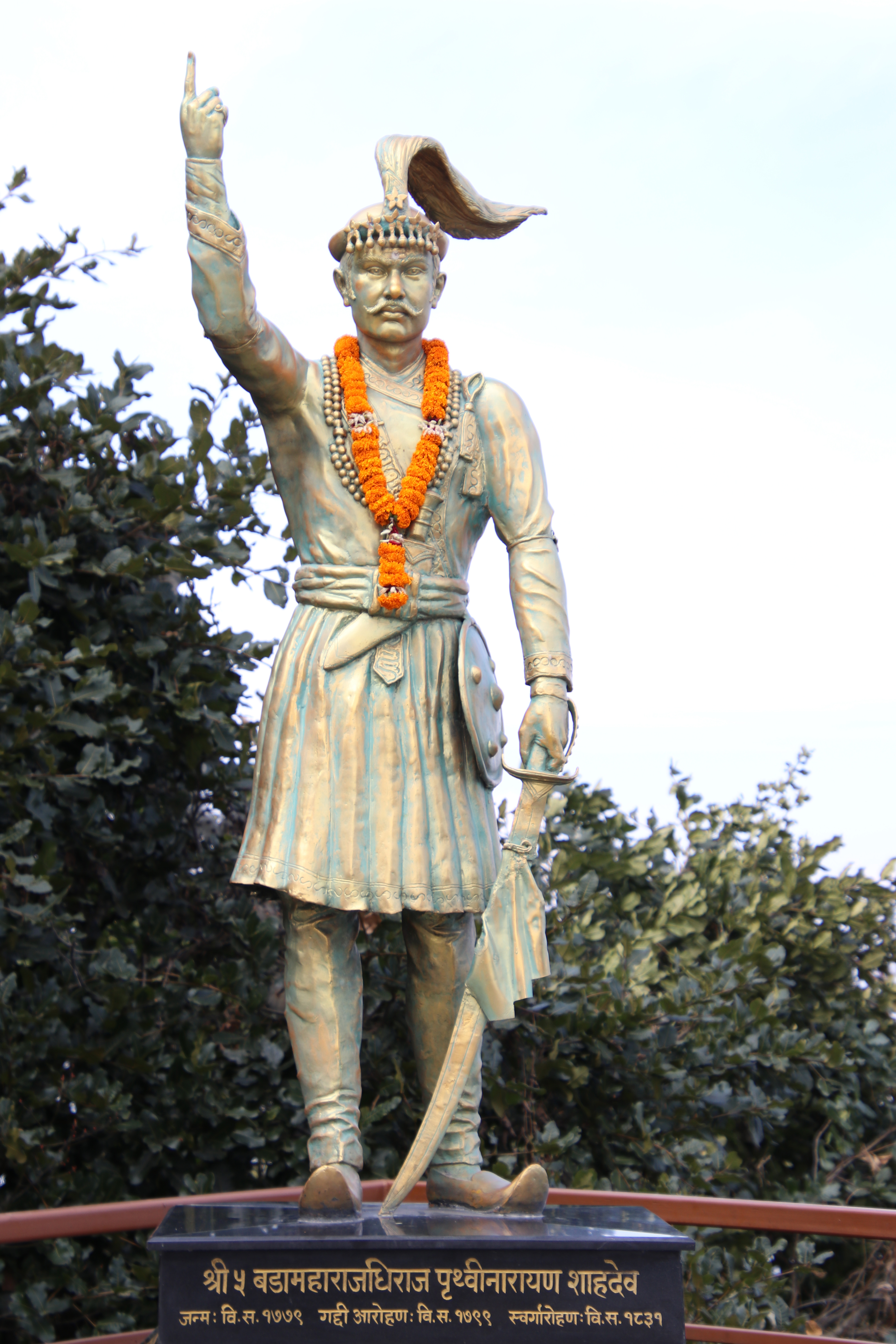
Statue of Shah at Chandragiri Hill. Shah is said to have planned to annex the Kathmandu valley after seeing it from the Chandragiri Hill.

After these peripheral victories, he intended to take possession of the highly urbanized Kathmandu Valley. Prithvi Narayan Shah's conquest of the whole of Nepal was rendered easier by the chronic internal dissensions among the Malla rulers. Ranjit Malla, the chief of Bhadgaon, foolishly invoked the assistance of the Gorkha Chief due to his bitter feud with the rival chiefs of Patan and Kathmandu. Prithvi Narayan Shah had previously gained over the Satbahalyas of Ranjit Malla by promising to leave them nominal rights while securing his tactical dominance over the country.

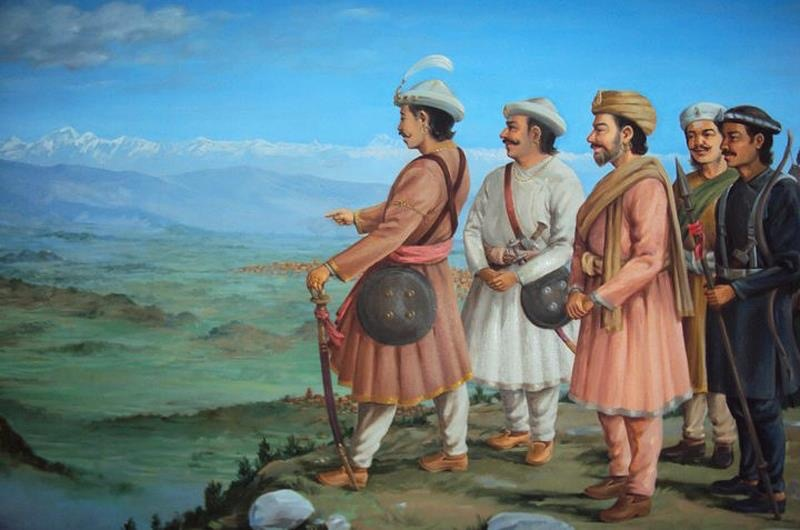
Prithvi Narayan Shah and his close advisors viewing the Kathmandu Valley from Chandragiri Hill top, planning their conquest.

Prithvi Narayan Shah took possession of Bhadgaon and next invested Patan in 1767. The rapid expansion of the Gorkha dominions and the growth of the Gorkha power round the Nepal valley placed Jaya Prakash Malla, the Chief of Kathmandu, in a state of absolute siege. All egress and ingress having been stopped, Kathmandu faced the immediate danger of being starved into submission. The valley was completely cut off from the outside world and was controlled solely by Shah's blockading outposts. Having understood that the Gorkhas could not be defeated by his army alone, Jaya Prakash in this predicament sought emergency military assistance from the Bengal Presidency by sending an emissary to Patna in order to ask for an intervention from the East India Company. The officers in Patna of the East India Company dispatched the message to Bengal, eager to exploit the dynamic. The East India Company seized the opportunity, sent an ultimatum to Prithvi Narayan Shah, and decided to send an expeditionary force to relieve Jaya Prakash Malla.

According to chroniclers, when Prithvi Narayan Shah entered the durbar of Bhadgaon, he found the defeated kings of three towns sitting together, whereat he and his companions laughed. Jaya Prakash was offended by this, and said, "O Gorkhalis, this has come to pass through the treachery of our servants, or else you would have had no cause for mirth." Prithvi Narayan Shah having conversed with Jaya Prakash Malla for a while then paid his respects to the aging Ranajit Malla, and respectfully asked him to continue to rule as he had hitherto done under a protectorate. Ranjit Malla stated that Prithvi Narayan Shah had obtained the sovereignty by the favor of God and that all he now requested was safe passage to Benaras. Shah granted him the leave along with the full expenses used for the long journey.

He also occupied the Kuti Pass in circa 1756 CE, completely halting all trade through the pass and preventing communication between the Mallas and Tibet.

== Kinloch expedition ==
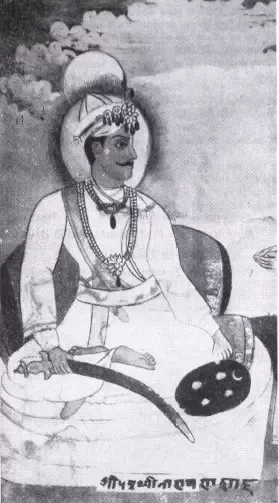
Prithvi Narayan Shah, 18th century.

Following the loss of valley outposts, Jaya Prakash Malla, out of sheer desperation, sent Nepali Vakeels to Mr. Golding, the Commercial Agent of the East India Company at Bettiah, to solicit their armed help against Prithvi Narayan Shah. The purport of the conversation between the Nepali Vakeels and Golding was communicated to Thomas Rumbold, the company's chief at Patna, on 6 April 1767. Golding had made a strong case for sending an expedition to the relief of Jaya Prakash Malla. According to him, if Malla was successfully relieved, the East India Company would earn his deep gratitude which would facilitate the permanent opening of communication with Tibet through Nepal. Malla offered to bear all costs of the company's expedition.

In the meantime, Prithvi Narayan Shah had already realized the catastrophic danger of a military alliance between Malla and the East India Company. Shah sent a strategic letter to Rumbold requesting a diplomatic visit to Patna to delay action. However, the Select Committee under the persuasion of Golding decided to instead launch an immediate military expedition to smash the Gorkhali blockade.

The Select Committee directed Captain George Kinloch to proceed to Patna so that he might lead the expedition against Prithvi Narayan Shah. The revival of the declining trade relations with Nepal and the opening up of rich Tibet trade through Nepali territory were the primary considerations. Under instructions from the Select Committee, Capt. Kinloch proceeded to Patna. Pursuant to the committee's decision, Mr. Rumbold and Capt. Kinloch gathered information regarding paths. In the meantime, Prithvi Narayan Shah was peremptorily asked to accept the East India Company mediation to which he sent an evasive, non-committal reply.

In June 1767, The Nepali Vakeels Muktananda and Faqir Ramdoss who came to solicit East India Company help on behalf of Jaya Prakash Malla were examined by Capt. Kinloch at Patna. The strength of Prithvi Narayan Shah's standing troops, as the Vakeels claimed, was near about 50,000 of which only 20,000 were stationed in the Nepal valley and the rest was engaged in seasonal cultivation in their native districts. Their arms comprised bows and arrows, swords, and heavy matchlocks. The Vakeels also made no secret of the fact that there was no time to lose, as with the break of the monsoon the hilly paths would become treacherous death traps and the mountain rivers completely impassable.

The expedition, however, completely miscarried and the high hopes of the Select Committee were shattered. The reasons for the structural failure were set forth in a series of letters between Capt. Kinloch and Mr. Rumbold. The first reason mentioned was the total destruction of the major part of their heavy provisions by a sudden flash flood from the hills. The second reason was that no supplies materialized from the Malla rulers due to the tight Gorkhali counter-blockade. When Capt. Kinloch reached Janakpur assurances of abundant supply were given, but once the troops reached Sindhuli, the promised help collapsed. Famine stared them in the face. Retreat under the present circumstances was out of the question and it was impossible to hold Sindhuli for long as all supplies of provisions had been cut off by the mobile units of Prithvi Narayan Shah. As Kinloch insisted, the troops tried to cross the raging Bagmati River. The troops built an improvised bridge and rafts, but the violent alpine torrent washed them down before any significant force could cross. Famished, exhausted, and falling sick in massive numbers, the company's troops ordered an immediate retreat. The retreating British forces were hotly pursued and cut down by the Gorkhas sent by Prithvi Narayan Shah. Capt. Kinloch fled back to the Terai and occupied the low-lying territories of Bara, Parsa and Hilwall to cover his losses. The total miscarriage of the Kinloch expedition allowed Prithvi Narayan Shah to deal definitively with the besieged capitals of Kathmandu, Patan, and Bhadgaon. By the end of the year 1768, he had succeeded in reducing all the cities that still held out. Prithvi Narayan Shah entered Kathmandu unopposed on 25 September 1768 during the Indra Jatra revelry in which the local population and defenders were thoroughly distracted.

== Campaign timeline ==
Indicates a favorable outcome Indicates an unfavorable outcome Indicates an uncertain or mixed outcome

Summary of Campaigns under Prithvi Narayan Shah
No.	Date(s)	Clash(es)	Type(s)	Conflict(s)	Opponent(s)	Location(s)	Result(s)
1.	1743 AD (1800 B.S.)	First Battle of Nuwakot	Battle; Siege	Unification of Nepal	Kingdom of Kantipur (Nuwakot forces)	Nuwakot	Defeat
2.	1744 AD (1801 B.S.)	Second Battle of Nuwakot	Battle; Siege	Unification of Nepal	Kingdom of Kantipur	Nuwakot	Victory
3.	1746 AD (1803 B.S.)	Battle of Naldum	Battle	Unification of Nepal	Kantipur forces	Naldum	Victory
4.	1754 AD (1811 B.S.)	Capture of Dolakha and Kirtipur borders	Siege	Unification of Nepal	Malla kingdoms border defense	Dolakha / Sankhu	Victory
5.	1757 AD (1814 B.S.)	First Battle of Kirtipur	Battle; Siege	Unification of Nepal	Kingdom of Lalitpur / Kirtipur	Kirtipur	Defeat
6.	1759 AD (1816 B.S.)	Capture of Shivapuri and Northern Ridges	Blockade Strategy	Unification of Nepal	Kathmandu Valley Kingdoms	Shivapuri Hills	Victory
7.	August 1762 (1819 B.S.)	Conquest of Makawanpur	Battle; Siege	Unification of Nepal	Sen Kingdom of Makawanpur	Makawanpur	Victory
8.	January 1763 (1819 B.S.)	Battle against Gurgin Khan	Battle	Foreign Intervention Counter	Nawab of Bengal (Mir Qasim's Army)	Makawanpur plains	Victory
9.	1764 AD (1821 B.S.)	Second Battle of Kirtipur	Battle; Siege	Unification of Nepal	Kingdom of Lalitpur / Kirtipur	Kirtipur	Defeat
10.	March 1766 (1822 B.S.)	Third Battle of Kirtipur	Siege; Surrender	Unification of Nepal	Kingdom of Lalitpur / Kirtipur	Kirtipur	Victory
11.	September 1767 (1824 B.S.)	Battle of Sindhuli Gadhi	Battle (Ambush)	Foreign Intervention Counter	East India Company (Kinloch Expedition)	Sindhuli Gadhi	Victory
12.	September 1768 (1825 B.S.)	Conquest of Kantipur	Surprise Raid	Unification of Nepal	Kingdom of Kantipur (Jaya Prakash Malla)	Kathmandu	Victory
13.	October 1768 (1825 B.S.)	Conquest of Lalitpur	Surrender	Unification of Nepal	Kingdom of Lalitpur (Tej Narsingh Malla)	Lalitpur	Victory
14.	November 1769 (1826 B.S.)	Conquest of Bhaktapur	Siege; Battle	Unification of Nepal	Kingdom of Bhaktapur (Ranajit Malla)	Bhaktapur	Victory
15.	1771 AD (1828 B.S.)	Battle of Satahun	Battle	Western Expansion Campaign	Chaubisi Alliance (Tanahun/Syangja)	Satahun, Western Nepal	Defeat
16.	1773 AD (1830 B.S.)	Conquest of Majh Kirat	Campaign	Eastern Expansion Campaign	Rai Principalities (Khambuwan)	Eastern Nepal (Arun River region)	Victory
17.	1774 AD (1831 B.S.)	Annexation of Pallo Kirant	Treaty; Annexation	Eastern Expansion Campaign	Limbu Principalities (Limbuwan)	Eastern Nepal (Mechi River region)	Victory

== Divyopadesh ==
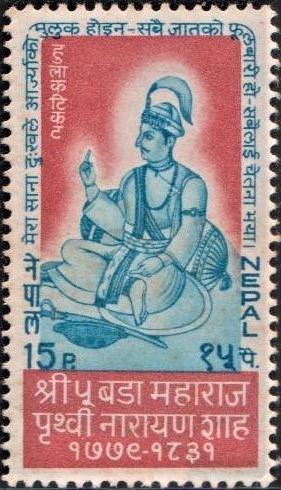
Nepali stamp featuring Prithvi Narayan Shah with a quote from his Divyopadesh c. 1968.

Towards the end of his life, Prithvi Narayan Shah was troubled by a series of severe illnesses. Realizing his end was near, he organized an unofficial, high-level council meeting known as a bhardaari-sabha at Nuwakot. In this final assembly, he decided to systematically instruct his brothers, his heir apparent, and his ministers on why he had undertaken the unification of Nepal and what the appropriate geopolitical, economic, and social policies for the future should be. This council continued for several hours. The deep insights and commands he delivered in this sabha were preserved by his brothers and court ministers and compiled into the historic text known as the Divyopadesh.

मेरा साना दुखले आर्ज्याको मुलुक होइन यो चार जात छात्तिश वर्ण सबैको साझा फूलबारी हो सबैलाइ चेतना भया।। (transl. This is not the nation gained by my trifle efforts, this is the garden of all 4 main castes and 36 sub-castes, and may all be aware of this.)

The text serves as a core philosophical cornerstone of early Nepalese political science and foreign policy, famously defining the country's delicate position between the Qing Dynasty of China and the British Empire in India as "a yam between two boulders" (दुई ढुङ्गाबीचको तरुल).

== Religion ==
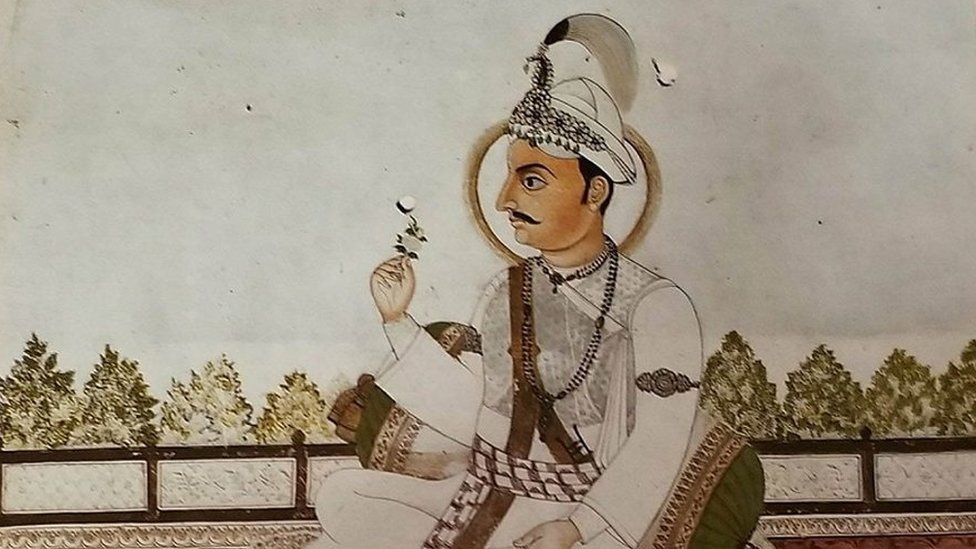
Prithvi Narayan Shah, 18th century.

Prithvi Narayan Shah was a staunch orthodox Hindu. After he became the undisputed master of the Kathmandu Valley, he began to implement a strict policy of exclusion and expulsion against European influences. The Capuchin missionaries, who had resided in Nepal for decades under the patronage of the Malla Kings and had successfully converted sections of the local population while acquiring prime lands, were expelled from the borders. He proudly designated his newly consolidated realm as the true 'Asal Hindustan' (the Authentic Land of the Hindus), lamenting that northern India had fallen under Muslim and British domination. He strictly advised the citizens of Nepal to never deviate from the traditional sanatan dharma and customs of their ancestors.

== Economic policy ==
Prithvi Narayan Shah strongly emphasized absolute economic nationalism and import substitution. In his *Divya Upadesh*, he warned that if foreign merchants were allowed to enter Nepal, they would turn the country into an economic colony and suck its resources dry. In this context, he mandated a strict national boycott on wearing imported foreign clothes and promoted the immediate training of local artisans to weave indigenous textiles. He believed that by maintaining a closed economy, precious metals and national wealth would be prevented from draining out of the country. He explicitly encouraged the harvesting and exporting of valuable Himalayan herbs to foreign lands while ensuring the gold and silver attained returned directly to the capital. He famously observed, "प्रजा मोटो भए दरबार पनि बलियो रहन्छ" (If the peasantry is prosperous, the palace will remain unassailable).

== Defense policy ==
King Prithvi Narayan Shah laid the foundation of the modern standing army by establishing the Nepal Army in August 1762 with the creation of five permanent companies: the Shreenath, Kali Baksh, Barda Bahadur, Sabuj, and Gorakh Companies. He emphasized defensive architecture and the strategic exploitation of the rugged terrain. He considered the geography of Nepal as an impregnable, natural fortress constructed by God Himself. He directed the construction of heavily fortified military garrisons at key strategic heights surrounding the valley: Shivapuri, Phulchowki, Chandragiri, Mahadevpokhari, Palung, Daapcha, and Kaahule, ensuring each was permanently armed with heavy artillery. He advocated for the construction of massive iron checkpoints at all major mountain passes (*bhanjyangs*), which he argued would secure the realm against foreign spies, saboteurs, and military incursions.

== Memorials ==
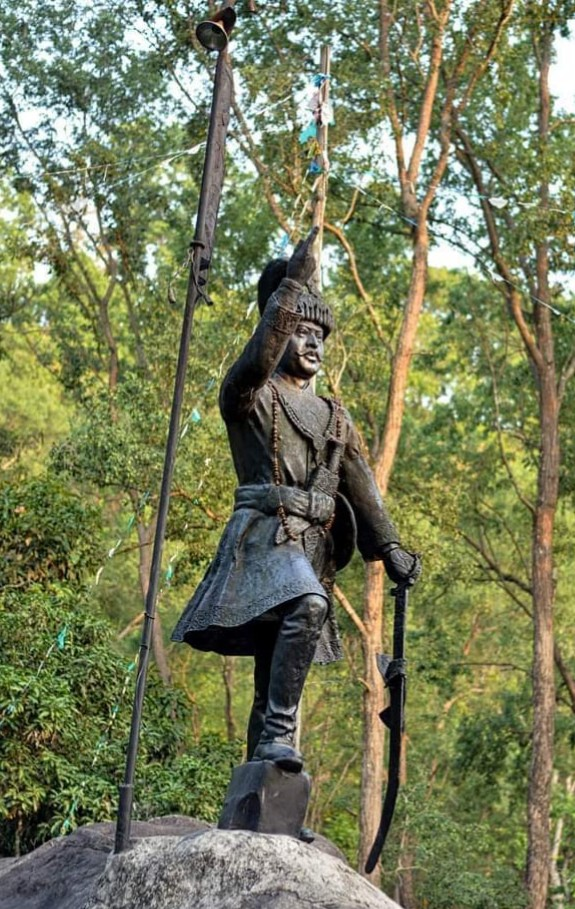
Statue of Prithvi Narayan Shah at Prithvi Smarak, Devighat, the site where he was cremated.

1. Prithvi Highway – The critical arterial highway connecting the Kathmandu Valley with western Nepal.
2. Prithvi Narayan Campus – The largest public post-secondary educational campus in Pokhara.
3. Prithvi Jayanti – A national day celebrated annually on the 27th of Poush in the Bikram Sambat calendar to honor his birth and contributions.

== Death and legacy ==
King Prithvi Narayaṇ Shah was ultimately able to capture dozens of independent principalities and annex them into a single centralized kingdom. This expansion was historically critical to ensure the survival of an independent Himalayan state, as the British East India Company was aggressively consuming the fractured princely states of India along Nepal's southern frontier. Shah was convinced that if Nepal remained an unstable collection of fifty microscopic principalities, it would easily be targeted, divided, and conquered by any advancing foreign empire. Expanding his kingdom ensured that a unified Nepal could negotiate with foreign empires on equal terms from a position of strategic depth.

In January 1775, at the age of 52, Prithvi Narayan Shah died at Devighat, Nuwakot on his birthday. Upon his death, his eldest son, Pratap Singh Shah, succeeded him to the throne, while the broader unification campaign was dynamically pushed forward into western and eastern borders by his younger son, Regent Bahadur Shah, and his daughter-in-law, Queen Rajendra Laxmi.

== Notes ==
Prithvi Narayan Shah Shah dynasty Born: 7 January 1723 Died: 11 January 1775
Regnal titles
Preceded by Nara Bhupal Shah	King of Gorkha; 1743–1768	Succeeded by Himself as King of Nepal
Preceded by Himself as King of Gorkha	King of Nepal; 1768–1775	Succeeded by Pratap Singh Shah
