= Shah (surname) =

Shah is a popular surname in India, Nepal, Bangladesh, and Pakistan. Shah (/ʃɑː/; Persian: شاه, romanized: Šāh, pronounced [ʃɒːh], 'king') is a title given to the emperors, kings, princes and lords of Iran (historically known as Persia in the West).

== History ==
In the Gujarat and Rajasthan region, the name "Shah", "Sha", or "Sah" may be derived from Gujarati Sah meaning "merchant" (from Sanskrit Sadhu meaning "honest, good") and Prakrit Sahu, while the actual spelling "Shah" was popularized by the Persian word for King. As a result, especially in Western culture, use of the spelling "Shah" has become far more pronounced than the other variants. The word Sadhu/Sahu is also separately used to indicate a holy man, such as a Jain monk (see Namokar Mantra). The Indian surnames "Shah" and "Sahu" are variants of one another which have evolved from the word "Sah" over time. Another variant is Sheth.

One early use of the title Sadhu occurs in an inscription on an AD 850 Pārśvanātha image in the Akota Bronzes.

In numerous 12th–13th century inscriptions the Śrāvaka who installed the image is given the title "Sahu".

सं १५१० वर्षे माघ सुदी ८ सोमे गोपाचल दुर्गे तोमर वंशान्वये राजा श्री डूंगरेन्द्र देव राज्य पवित्रमाने श्री काष्ठासंघ माथुरान्वये भट्टारक श्री गुणकीर्ति देवास्तत्पट्टे श्री मलयकीर्ति देवास्ततो भट्टारक गुणभद्रदेव पंडितवर्य रइघू तदाम्नाये अग्रोतवंशे वासिलगोत्रे सकेलहा भार्या निवारी तयोः पुत्र विजयष्ट शाह ... साधु श्री माल्हा पुत्र संघातिपति देउताय पुत्र संघातिपति करमसीह श्री चन्द्रप्रभु जिनबिंब महाकाय प्रतिष्ठापित प्रणमति ..शुभम् भवतु ..

— A Gwalior Fort Inscription 1453

For example:

- A 12th century Jain altarpiece in Los Angeles County Museum of Art mentions Grahapati Sadhu Kundha
- Vibudh Shridhar mentions his patron Nattal Sahu, a 12th-century merchant prince in Delhi.
- From Gwalior: Here both Sah and Sadhu have been used in the 1510 inscription.
- From Ahar, Madhya Pradesh: "Samvat 1210 vaishakha sudi 13 grahpatyanvayae sahu shrisadhu bharya mana tayoh... ete paNamanti nityam."

Here the word Sahu is equivalent to the Sanskrit word "sadhu". Some inscriptions use "sadhu" itself :

- From Bahuriband (Katni, MP): "Svasti shri samvat 1070 phalgunavadi... madhavannandinugrahitah sadhu-shri sarvadharah.."

The word Sadhu here does not mean a monk but a "gentleman". Some inscriptions abbreviate sahu by just "Sa." just like the abbreviation in English, "Mr." In some business communities, genealogies are recited during marriages, where all ancestors would be respectfully called "Sahu". The term "Sahukari" means the profession of banking/trading, and is derived from Sahu (Sanskrit "Sadhu") and -kar (Sanskrit for doer). In the Bundelkhand Jain community, the father-in-law (or son's/daughter's father-in-law) used to be called "Sahaji". Thus the words "Shah" etc. all indicate a respected member of the mercantile community. Today it is used by Gujarati business communities.

== People with the surname ==
- Asif Shah, Nepalese TV presenter, director, producer, actor, singer, and rapper.
- Shah Abdul Karim, Bangladeshi Baul
- Amin Shah, Indian politician
- Amina Shah (1918–2014), anthologiser of Sufi stories and folk tales
- Amina Shah (librarian), Scottish librarian
- Amit Shah, Indian politician
- Amna Shah, Canadian politician
- Arvind Victor Shah, (born 1940), Swiss engineer, educator and scientist
- Ashiesh Shah, Indian architect and designer
- Balendra Shah, Nepalese rapper, structural engineer, and politician
- Bishwa Bahadur Shah, Nepalese-American politician
- Brandon Shah (died 2026), American army aviator
- Bulleh Shah (c.1680–c.1758), Punjabi Sufi poet
- Daisy Shah, Indian Actress
- Eddy Shah, British businessman and writer
- Ema Shah (born 1981), Kuwaiti singer, composer, and director
- Ethan Shah (born 2005), Local Ajax resident, basketball player, and philanthropist
- Fahmida Shah (born 1966), British Asian silk painter
- Farah Shah, Pakistani actress and host
- Fatima Shah (1914–2002), Pakistani physician and disability activist
- Harmonica Shah (born 1946), American blues harmonicist and singer
- Hetul Shah (born 1999), Indian chess player
- Jawahar Shah (born 1955), Indian homeopath
- Jay Shah, Indian politician and BCCI official
- Jen Shah (born 1973), American television personality
- Jigar Shah (born 1974), Indian businessman
- Kiran Shah (born 1956), Kenyan-born actor and stuntman
- Khushdil Shah, Pakistani cricketer
- Komal Shah (disambiguation)
  - Komal Shah (art collector), art collector, philanthropist, computer engineer, and businessperson in Silicon Valley
- K. J. Shah, Indian philosopher
- Mariya Shah (born 1984), Indian politician
- Nadine Shah (born 1986), English singer-songwriter
- Nagambal Shah, Indian-American mathematician and statistician
- Naseem Shah, Pakistani cricketer
- Naseeruddin Shah, Indian actor
- Naz Shah (born 1973), British Labour Party politician
- Neel Shah, American physician
- Neer Shah, Nepalese actor, musician, and filmmaker
- Niraj Shah (born 1973/74), American businessman
- Nirav D. Shah, American epidemiologist, economist, and attorney
- Owais Shah, English cricketer
- Paul Shah, Nepalese model and actor.
- Pooja Shah (born 1979), British Asian actress
- Rahil Shah, Indian cricketer
- Raj Shah, American politician
- Rajendra Keshavlal Shah (1913–2010), lyrical poet who wrote in Gujarati
- Raline Shah (born 1985), Indonesian actress
- Rajiv Shah (born 1973), administrator of the United States Agency for International Development
- Ratna Pathak Shah, Indian actress
- Ravindu Shah (born 1972), Kenyan cricketer
- Ray Shah (born 1978), contestant on the fourth series of the British Big Brother
- Rina Shah, American political strategist
- Rishi Shah (born 1985/86), American billionaire, founder of Outcome Health
- Roger Shah, German electronic music producer
- Safia Shah, author
- Saira Shah, English author, reporter and documentary filmmaker
- Saleem Shah, Indian-American psychologist
- Salman Shah (economist), Pakistani economist
- Salman Shah (actor), Bangladeshi actor
- Samir Shah, British television and radio executive, who serves as Chair of the BBC
- Samragyee RL Shah, Nepalese actress
- Sanjay Shah, Dubai-based businessman
- Satish Shah, Indian film and television actor
- Syed Muhammad Asghar Shah (1949–2025), Pakistani politician
- Tejal Shah (born 1979), Indian visual artist, curator
- Ushna Shah, Pakistani actress
- Yasir Shah, Pakistani cricketer

=== Nobility ===
- Bahadur Shah of Nepal, Prince regent of Nepal
- Birendra Bir Bikram Shah, King of Nepal
- Chatra Shah, King of Gorkha
- Dambar Shah, King of Gorkha
- Dipendra Bir Bikram Shah, King of Nepal
- Dravya Shah, King of Gorkha
- Fateh Jung Shah, Prime Minister of Nepal from the royal Shah dynasty
- Girvan Yuddha Bikram Shah, King of Nepal
- Gyanendra Bir Bikram Shah, King of Nepal
- Krishna Shah, King of Gorkha
- Mahendra Bir Bikram Shah, King of Nepal
- Nara Bhupal Shah, King of Gorkha
- Pratap Singh Shah, King of Nepal
- Prithvipati Shah, King of Gorkha
- Prithvi Bir Bikram Shah, King of Nepal
- Prithvi Narayan Shah, King of Nepal
- Purna Shah, King of Gorkha
- Pushkar Shah, Mukhtiyar of Nepal from the royal Shah dynasty
- Rajendra Bikram Shah, King of Nepal
- Ram Shah, King of Gorkha
- Rana Bahadur Shah, King of Nepal
- Rudra Shah, King of Gorkha
- Surendra Bikram Shah, King of Nepal
- Tribhuvan Bir Bikram Shah, King of Nepal

== See also ==
- Nattal Sahu
- Singhai
- Sheth
- Saha (surname)
- Sahu
- Shah
- Rana (name), another Indian parallel
- King (surname), the English parallel
