= Rina (given name) =

- Gender: Female

Origin
- Origin: Japanese, Sanskrit, Hebrew
- Meaning: Japanese: Different meanings depending on the kanji used Hindi: "melted" Hebrew: "song, joy"
- Region of origin: Japan

Rina is a feminine given name with multiple origins. In Japanese kanji, it could be written as (里奈, 璃奈, 莉愛, 璃菜, 利奈, 理名, 莉菜, 里菜, 梨奈, and 理菜). It is also a feminine name in the Sanskrit language meaning "melted" or "dissolved", and in Hebrew it is a name meaning "song; joy". The name Rina is also a hypocoristic for various names ending with 'rina' (Italian Caterina, German Katharina, Russian Ekaterina and others). Rina is also a similar name of Rena.

== Actresses ==
- Rina Aizawa (逢沢 りな, born 1991), Japanese actress and gravure idol
- Rina Akiyama (秋山 莉奈; born 1985), Japanese actress, gravure idol and television personality
- Rina Endō (遠藤 璃菜; born 2005), Japanese actress
- Rina Koike (小池 里奈, born 1993), Japanese actress and idol
- Rina Kitagawa (born 1993), Japanese voice actress
- Rina Misaki (born 1980), female Japanese voice actress and singer
- Rina Morelli (1908–1976), an Italian film and stage actress
- Rina Nakayama (born 1984), Japanese voice actress and actress
- Rina Satō (佐藤 利奈, born 1981), Japanese actress and singer
- Rina Uchiyama (内山 理名, born 1981), Japanese actress and idol
- Rina Zelyonaya (1902–1991), Soviet actress and singer

== Athletes ==
- Rina Akiyama (swimmer) (秋山 里奈), Japanese Paralympic swimmer
- Rina Hill (born 1969), Australian/British athlete
- Rina Ida (井田 莉菜; born 1991), Japanese curler
- Rina Kishi (born 2007), Japanese artistic gymnast
- Rina Okamoto (岡本 璃奈; born 1994), better known as Panchan Rina (ぱんちゃん 璃奈), Japanese kickboxer
- Rina Dewi Puspitasari (born 1985), Indonesian archer
- Rina Saigo (born 2000), Japanese tennis player
- Rina Thieleke (born 1987), German ice dancer
- Rina (wrestler), Japanese professional wrestler
- Rina Yamashita, Japanese professional wrestler

== Musicians and singers ==
- Rina Aiuchi (愛内 里菜, born 1980), former J-pop singer, songwriter, and producer
- Rina Balaj (born 1999), Kosovo-Albanian rapper
- Rina Chikano (近野 莉菜, born 1993), member of the J-pop idol group AKB48
- Rina Chinen (知念 里奈, born 1981), Japanese entertainer, model, TV actress, and former singer
- Rina Fujisawa (藤沢 里菜 born 1998), Japanese professional Go player
- Rina Ketty (1911–1996), French chanteuse
- Rina Massardi (1897–1979), Italian-Uruguayan singer, actress, and filmmaker
- Rina Sawayama (born 1990), Japanese-British singer-songwriter
- Rina Suzuki (musician) (鈴木理菜, born 1991), Japanese musician, drummer, and vocalist of the all-female pop rock band SCANDAL

== Other persons ==
- Rina Banerjee (born 1963), Indian-American artist
- Rina Foygel Barber (born 1982/83), American statistician
- Rina Chibany (born 1991), Miss Lebanon and Miss Universe 2012 contestant
- Rina Fukushi (born 1999), Japanese model
- Rina Lasnier (1915–1997), Canadian Québécoise poet
- Rina Mimoun, American television writer and producer
- Rina Mor (born 1956), first Israeli Miss Universe winner
- Rina Nose (born 1984), Indonesian actress, presenter, comedian and singer
- Rina Piccolo, Canadian cartoonist
- Rina Schenfeld (born 1938), Israeli choreographer and dancer
- Rina Shah, American political strategist
- Rina Venter (born 1938), first woman in South African history to hold a cabinet post (Minister of National Health and Population Development)
- Rina Zazkis, Canadian educator and academic

== Fictional characters ==
- Rina (Guitar Hero), a character in the video game Guitar Hero World Tour
- Rina, a female bassist in the TV series Drake & Josh
- Rina, a patient from season 3 of the TV series Grey's Anatomy
- Rina Lazarus, one of the two main characters in the Decker/Lazarus novels
- Rina, the female protagonist of A Jewish Girl in Shanghai
- Rina (Suikoden), character in the console role-playing game Suikoden II
- Rina Tōin (洞院 リナ), a character from the anime and manga series Mermaid Melody Pichi Pichi Pitch
- Rina Tennoji (天王寺 璃奈), a character from the media project Nijigasaki High School Idol Club
- Rina Umebayashi (梅林里奈), the main character from the Legend of the Angel webcomic series
- Rina Ishimori, a character from the video game and anime Little Battlers Experience
