= Richard Hoare =

Richard Hoare may refer to:

- Richard Hoare (banker) (1648–1719), founder of C. Hoare & Co, one of the United Kingdom's oldest private banks
- Sir Richard Hoare, 1st Baronet (1735–1787), see Hoare baronets
- Sir Richard Hoare, 2nd Baronet (1758–1838), English antiquarian, archaeologist, artist and traveller
- Richard Q. "Tigger" Hoare (1943–2020), founder of The Bulldog Trust

== See also ==
- Richard Hore (fl. 1536), early English explorer of Canada
