= Tim Hartnett =

American politician

Member of New Hampshire House of Representatives for Hillsborough County's 41st district
- In office December 4, 2024 – July 30, 2026
- Succeeded by: Bishwa Bahadur Shah (elect)

Personal details
- Party: Democratic
- Education: University of Connecticut (MSW), New England College(BA), Suffolk University(MHA)

Tim Hartnett is an American politician. He is a former member of the New Hampshire House of Representatives. He resigned from the chamber in July 2026.
