= Sahu =

Sahu or Sahukar is a surname found in India, they are especially found in Odisha, Chhattisgarh and neighbouring states. It is associated with Tailik (Teli) community. Sahu surname is also written as Sah in Bihar.

There are many people using the surname who belong to the Tailik (Teli) Sub-caste.

== List of people with the surname Sahu ==
- Bata Krushna Sahoo, Indian farmer and recipient of Padma Shri in 2020 for his contribution in animal husbandry
- Chandra Sekhar Sahu (born 1950), politician and former Member of Parliament representing the Berhampur constituency of Orissa, India
- Chandu Lal Sahu, politician and Member of parliament, Lok Sabha representing Mahasamund, Chhattisgarh
- Kishore Sahu (1915–1980), film actor and director from Madhya Pradesh, India
- Laxminarayan Sahu (1890–1963), writer and politician from Odisha, India
- Nandini Sahu (born 1973), writer and critic in English literature from Odisha, India
- Nattal Sahu (c. 1132), merchant prince who lived during the reign of the Tomara kings near Delhi
- Pardeep Sahu (born 1985), cricketer, Haryana & Kings XI Punjab
- Sarojini Sahoo (born 1956), Feminist writer and a columnist in The New Indian Express, from Odisha, India.
- Sudarshan Sahoo (born 1939), sculptor from Odisha, India
- Sunil Sahu, professor in the Department of Political Science at the DePauw University
- Supriya Sahu (born 1968) Indian Administrative Service, Director General, Doordarshan, President, Asia-Pacific Broadcasting Union
- Tarachand Sahu (1947–2012), politician from Chhattisgarh, India
- Tamradhwaj Sahu (born 1949), politician and former member of the 14th Lok Sabha of India, representing Durg Chhattisgarh
- Arun Sao (born 1968), politician, Dy. CM, Chhattisgarh India.
- Tokhan Sahu (born 1969), politician, Minister of State for Housing and Urban Affairs of India.

== See also ==
- Shah
- Ghanchi
- Sahu Jain Family
