= Fahmida Shah =

British Asian silk painter (born 1966)

Fahmida Shah (born 1966) is a British-born Asian silk painter.

== Life ==
Fahmida Shah was born in England, in 1966. She has worked as a project coordinator for the Bedford Asian Women's Textile Project. In 1993 she took part in the Nehru Gallery's National Textile Project, which solicited embroidered panels from Asian women's groups across Britain for display in the Victoria and Albert Museum. In 1994 she took part in the South Asian Contemporary Visual Arts Festival, staged throughout the West Midlands, as one of three craft makers at the Foyle Gallery, Midlands Arts Centre.

A hand-painted sari by Shah is included in the collection of saris held by Cartwright Hall in Bradford. The sari was shown in Unbound: Visionary Women Collecting Textiles, the 2020 exhibition at Two Temple Place.
