= The Bulldog Trust =

British charitable trust established in 1983

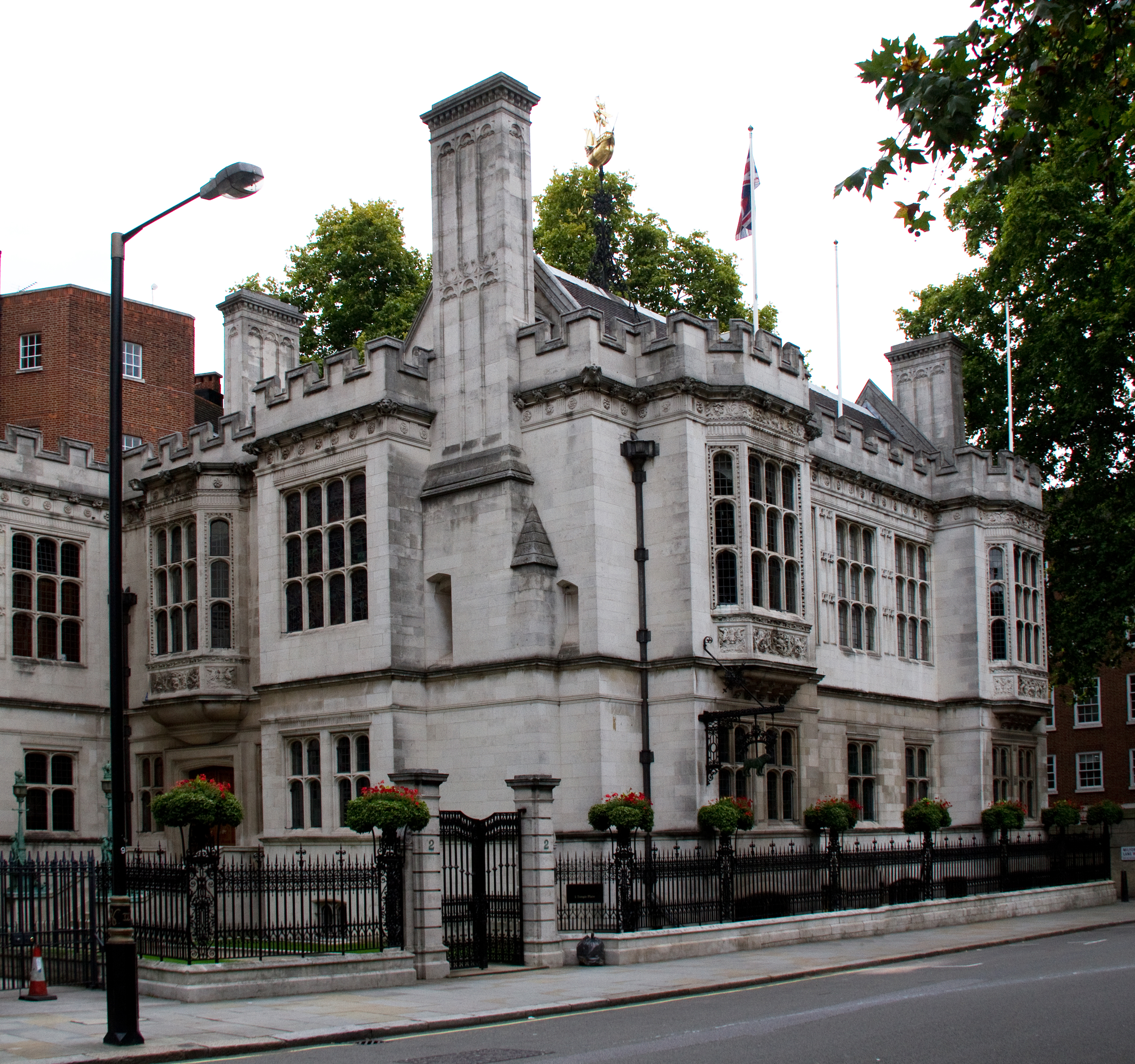
- 2 Temple Place – base for The Bulldog Trust.
- Founded: 1983; 43 years ago
- Founder: Richard Q. Hoare (1943–2020)
- Headquarters: 2 Temple Place, London WC2R 3BD, UK
- Key people: Mary Rose Gunn (Chief Executive); Charles M. R. Hoare (Chair of Trustees)
- Website: The Bulldog Trust; The Fore

The Bulldog Trust is a charitable trust aiming to encourage and facilitate philanthropy. Established in 1983 by Richard Q. Hoare OBE (1943–2020), to provide support and advice for charities facing immediate financial difficulties, the trust is based at and owns Two Temple Place in the City of London.

== Background ==
The Trust was founded in 1983 by Richard Q. Hoare OBE (widely known as "Tigger", 1943–2020) as a "charity to support charities". As stated on the trust's website: "Intrinsic to all its work is the ethos of making a real difference to the organisations it helps."

Mary Rose Gunn wrote in the Guardian obituary of Hoare: "Tigger's philanthropic spirit was never more in evidence than in his purchase of the stunning neo-gothic mansion on the Embankment, Two Temple Place. He had fallen in love with the house in 1999 and gave it to the Bulldog Trust because he felt its stunning interiors should be seen by the public. He supported the establishment of the house as a space devoted to showcasing regional museums and collections and opening up access to the arts. Free annual exhibition, education, events and volunteer programmes have run since 2011 and welcomed over 300,000 people to the house, building an extraordinarily loyal and enthusiastic army of Two Temple Place lovers."

== The Fore ==
In March 2017, the Bulldog Trust launched The Fore programme to assist developing early-stage charities and social enterprises, providing funding and expertise and the opportunity to share skills.
