= Two Temple Place =

Building in central London, England

Coordinates: 51.5116°N 0.1124°W

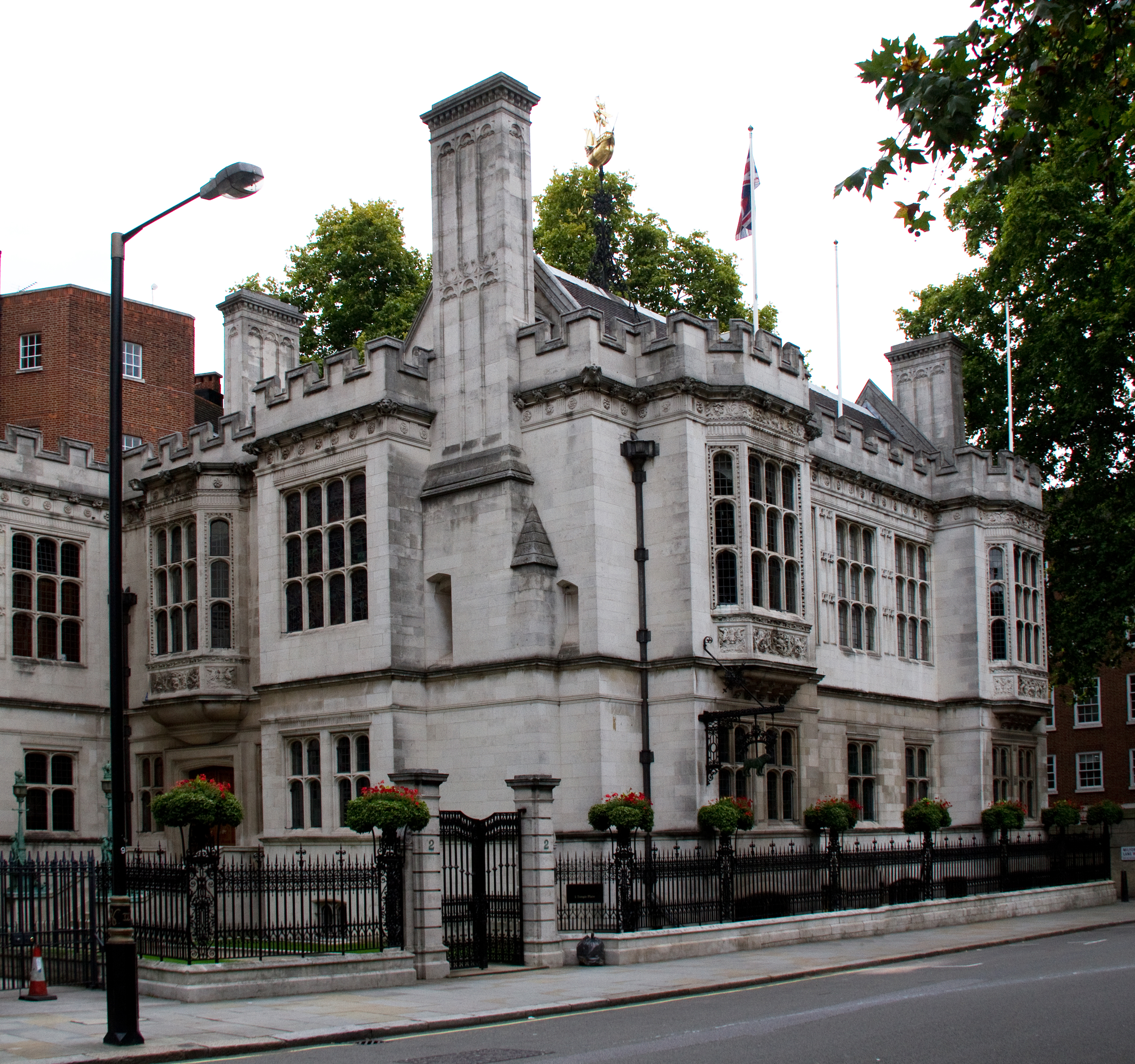
Two Temple Place is situated alongside the Victoria Embankment, near Somerset House in London.

Two Temple Place, known for many years as Astor House, is a Neo-Tudor building situated near Victoria Embankment in central London, England. It is known for its architecture, and contains notable works by William Silver Frith, Sir George Frampton RA, Nathaniel Hitch and Thomas Nicholls.

On 28 October 2011, Two Temple Place opened as a public gallery. It hosts exhibitions showcasing publicly owned art from regional collections in the United Kingdom, and is also used as a venue for private hire.

== Overview ==
The building was constructed on Temple Place by John Loughborough Pearson for William Waldorf Astor, in 1895. Originally known as the Astor Estate Office, it consists of two floors and a lower ground floor and is designed after the Early Elizabethan style. It is built entirely of Portland stone. The exterior stonework features splendid carvings by Nathaniel Hitch.

Above the crenellated parapets is a weather vane, representing the caravel Santa Maria in which Columbus sailed to America. The intention was to symbolize the connection of the path of discovery of his ancestor John Jacob Astor and the linking of United States and Europe. It was executed by J. Starkie Gardner, the English metal worker, who was responsible for all metalwork inside and outside the building.

John Dibblee Crace, one of a family of interior decorators, decorated the interior of Two Temple Place for Astor in the style of French Renaissance from about 1892 to 1895. He also decorated Astor's home in Cliveden. In what had been a bedroom, Astor had the walls paneled with "precious woods" and the ceiling gilded.

== History ==
=== William Waldorf Astor ===
William Waldorf Astor, founder of the famed New York City Waldorf Astoria, owned the gothic mansion (Note: There are also source that say that he built the place.) on the Victoria Embankment overlooking the River Thames. He built the space (Note: One source says that he commissioned an extensive $1.5 million renovation. And another says that he built the building for £250,000.) that was to become a "crenellated Tudor stronghold" with three things in mind. It would be his office and it had residential space, supporting his desire to create a home away from the United States (Note: By this time Astor had few emotional ties to the United States. By 1895, his parents and wife Mamie (d. December 1894) were both dead and he was at odds with family members. Being one of the richest men in the world, he had the capability of developing a sumptuous new life in England.) where he felt his children would be safer from the threat of kidnapping. Second, he had the wealth to support his vision for an opulent home for himself and his family – and his extensive collections of art work, musical instruments and books. And, lastly, he wanted the building to be both his home and offices for managing his holdings. (Note: Astor was extremely security conscious, fearing for kidnapping of his children and enduring harm himself. This was at least partly as a result Astor having met with an Italian fortune-teller during a visit to Rome who had warned him of danger that he might endure. Another of his homes, Hever Castle, had its drawbridge brought up each night.)

The building is described by Donald Strachan as follows:

Behind the sturdy Portland stone facade, the interior has a slight strange Victoriana-meets-Disney vibe with the otherwise straightforwardly opulent rooms (lots of marble and mahogany) adorned with bizarre details, such as the characters from The Three Musketeers (Astor's favorite book) on the banisters of the main staircase and the gilded frieze in the Great Hall showing 54 seemingly random characters from history and fiction, including Pocahontas, Machiavelli, Bismark, Anne Boleyn, and Marie Antoinette.

The architect was John Loughborough Pearson, often called the founder of Modern Gothic architecture. With seemingly unlimited funds at his disposal Pearson was able to design a lavish building with the assistance of eminent craftsmen. John Thompson & Sons Ltd of Peterborough were the builders. After Pearson's death, his son Frank Loughborough Pearson (1864–1947) continued his work on Two Temple Place when the building required some alterations under the ownership of Sun Life of Canada. For these alterations many of the original craftsmen were used again, including Nathaniel Hitch, as well as the original builder.

=== Intermediate owners ===
Since the Astor family sold the house it has had various owners: Sun Life of Canada owned the building from 1919 to 1928, who named it Sun of Canada House. In 1928 it was purchased by the Society of Incorporated Accountants and Auditors naming it the Incorporated Accountants Hall. On 19 February 1929 the building was opened as the "Head Office of the Society" by H.R.H. the Duke and Duchess of York. Smith & Nephew purchased the building in 1960 which served as its headquarters.

On 24 July 1944 the building, named "Astor House" at the time, was hit by a German flying bomb, which caused considerable damage to the house, including burst plumbing that resulted in some flooding, damaging expensive works of art, including works by William Silver Frith. The building, called "Accountants Hall" on the damage report, was deemed as suitable to be "partially demolished" and was fully restored between 1949 and 1951.

=== The Bulldog Trust ===
It is now managed and preserved by The Bulldog Trust, a charitable organisation, and is hired out for personal and functions. It opened to the public as a gallery in October 2011.

=== Two Temple Place gallery ===
Launched in 2011, the Exhibition Programme at Two Temple Place has delivered annual exhibitions in partnership with public museums, galleries and collections from around the UK. Two Temple Place is the first London venue specifically to showcase publicly-owned collections from around the UK.

The first exhibition to launch the building was in collaboration with the William Morris Gallery in Walthamstow. Titled William Morris: Story, Memory, Myth, the exhibition looked at how William Morris told stories through pattern and poetry and examined the tales that were most important to him, such as the works of Geoffrey Chaucer, Norse saga, Arthurian legend and Greek myth.

They host a year-round programme of community and cultural activity – including a major exhibition – with the aim of offering opportunities to a wide range of people and sharing the building as a tool for conversation, education and advocacy. As a charity, the building also generates income through fundraising and commercial hires.

== The forecourt and portico ==
One enters the building through a set of iron gates that lead onto a paved forecourt and lawn with an arcaded boundary wall on one side and on the other a portico designed by Frith. Balustraded stone steps lead up to the main door, these steps being flanked on either side by two bronze lamp standards featuring the figures of two small mischievous-looking boys. These cherubs by Frith, with one conversing through a telephone, celebrate the then new age of telecommunication and electricity.

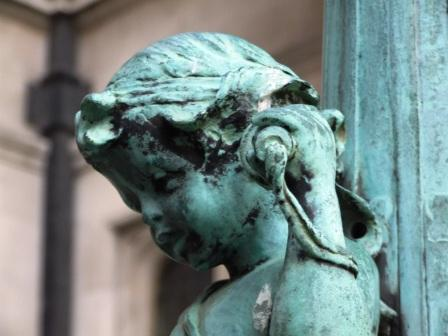
The bronze lamp standard on the right of the stairs. The age of the telephone has dawned!

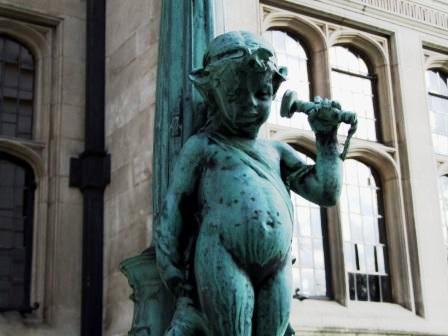
The first of Frith’s bronze lamp standards-that on the right of the stairs.

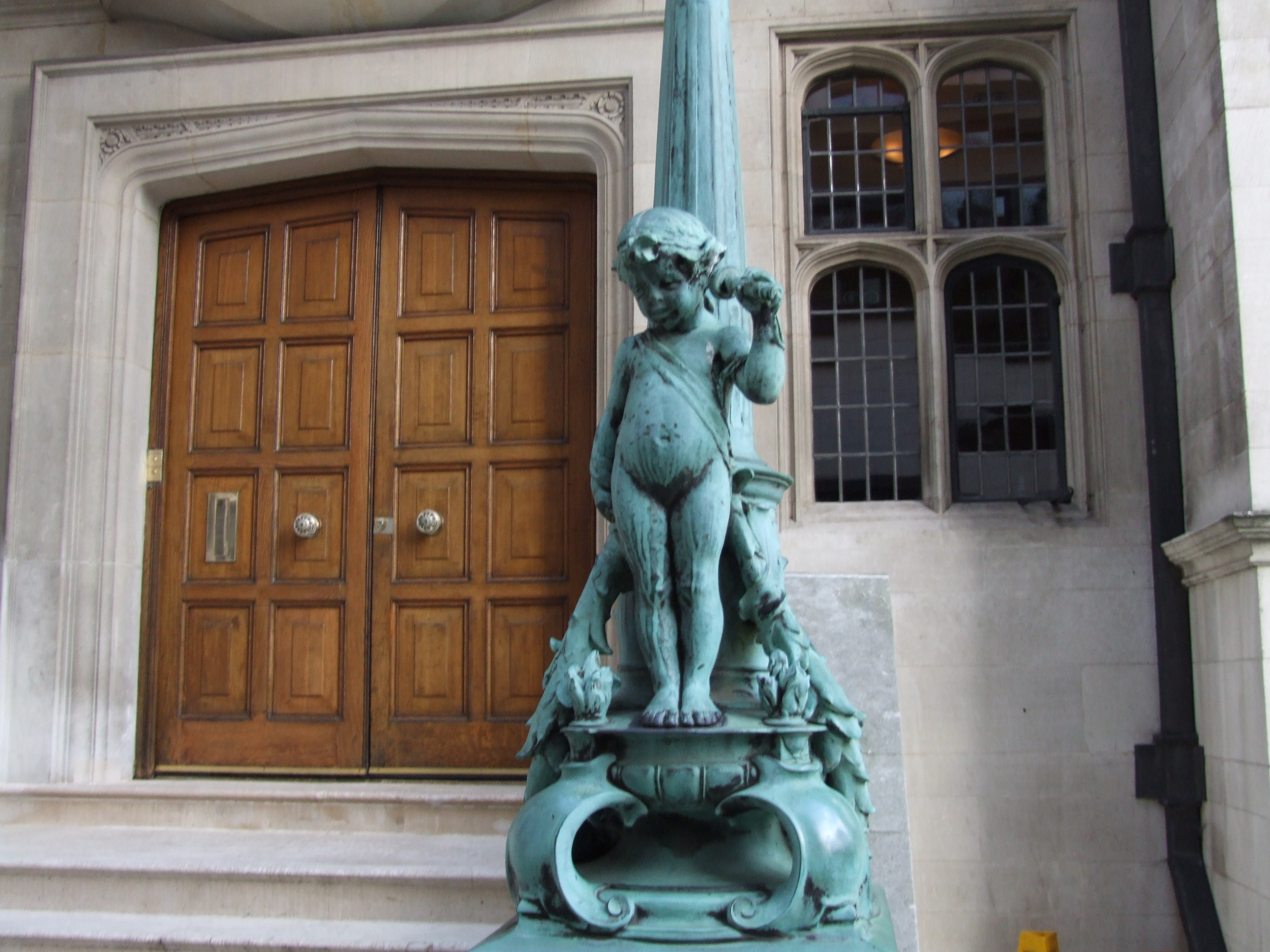
Another view of the bronze lamp standard on the right of the stairs.

The other cherub on the left side of the stairs holds up a globe.

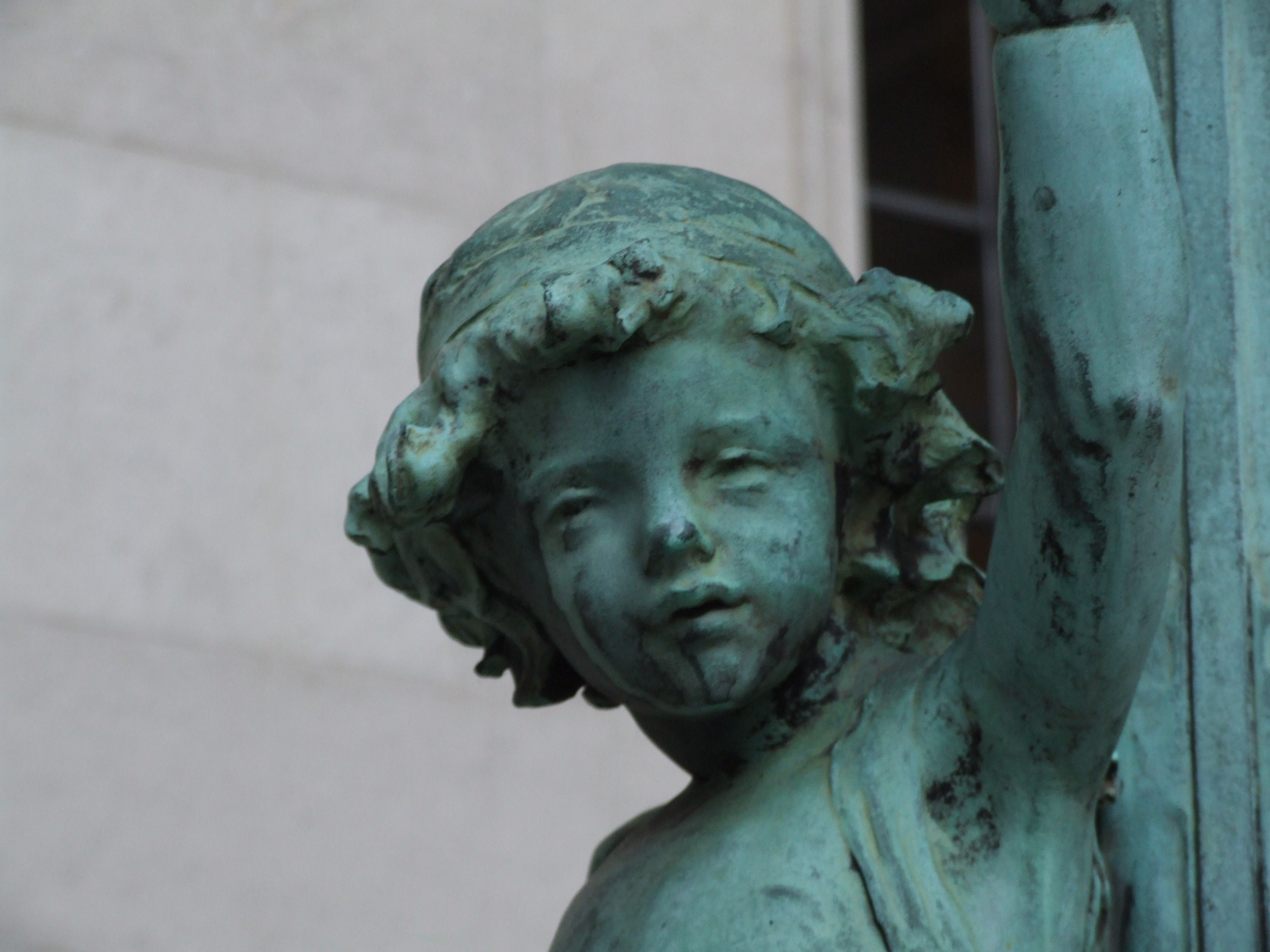
The bronze lamp standard on the left of the stairs.

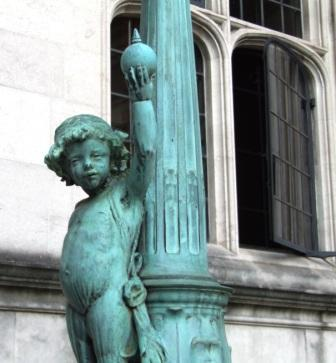
The second of Frith’s bronze lamp standards that on the left of the portico stairs.

== The vestibule ==
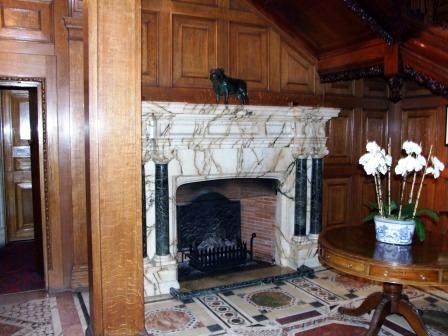
Pavonazetto marble fireplace and a glimpse of Davison’s floor.

Through the entrance doors one enters a stone-lined vestibule with carvings in the early Renaissance style and inside this vestibule there is a War Memorial Stone remembering those members of The Society of Incorporated Accountants and Auditors who died in the 1914–18 war, this unveiled by the Duke of York and a Commemoration stone recording the Hall's opening by the Duke and Duchess of York on 19 February 1929.

The floor is the work of Robert Davison and is a mixture of marble, jasper, porphyry and onyx all laid in geometrical patterns. This is known as "opus alexandrinum". It was Davison who was responsible for all the marble work in the house. There is a similar floor in Westminster Abbey. The staircase is made of oak and mahogany.

== The main staircase and gallery ==
The main staircase rises up from the Staircase Hall to the Gallery on the first floor and comprises three flights of stairs. The staircase has seven mahogany carvings by Thomas Nicholls on the newel posts, these representing characters from Alexandre Dumas’s The Three Musketeers, which, it seems, was Astor’s favourite novel.

Nicholls’ characters include d'Artagnan himself, Madame Bonacieux, Aramis, shown slipping off a scholar’s gown and at the same time reading a love letter, Milady, Bazin, Athos and Porthos. Bazin, the valet to Aramis, was a studious person who later became a lay brother. Nicholls carves him brushing his master's clothes while studying theology.

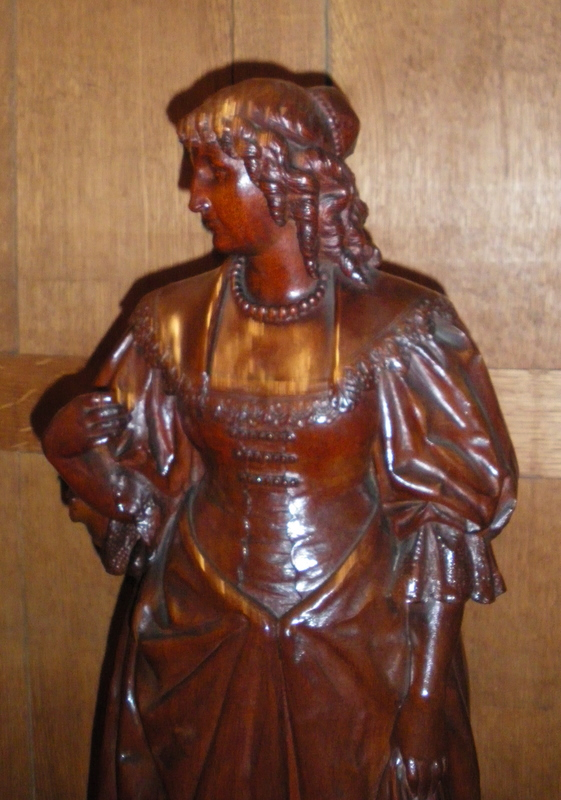
Milady.

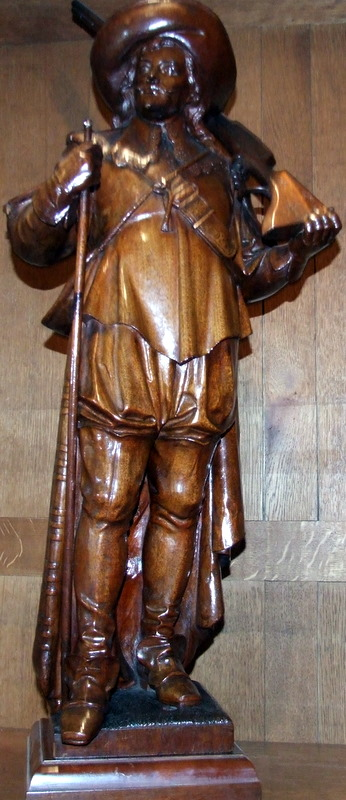
Porthos.

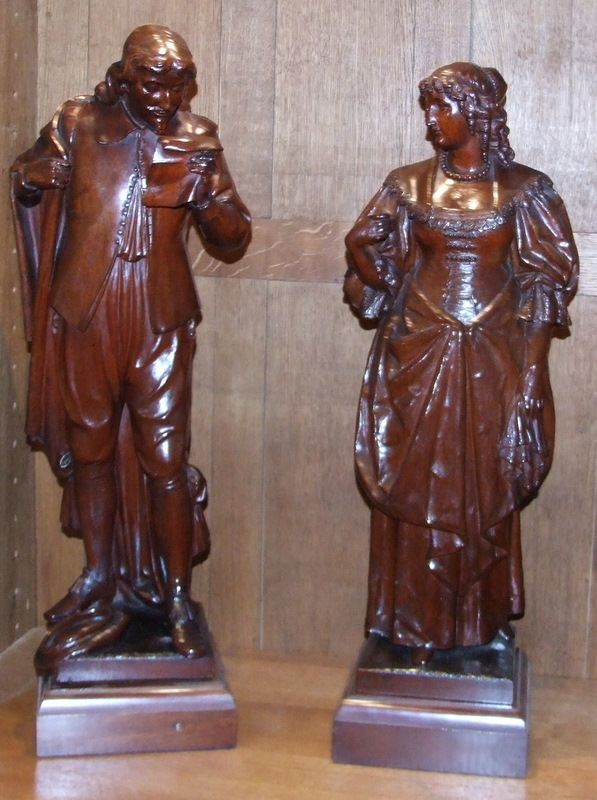
Aramis and Milady.

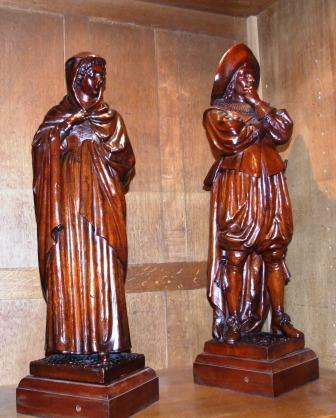
D’Artagnan and Madame Bonacieux.

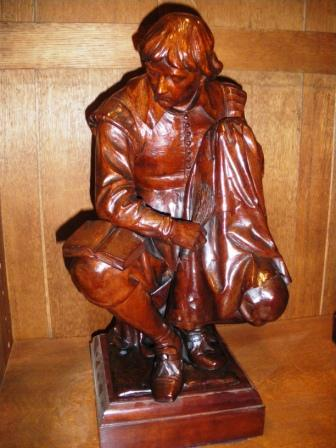
Thomas Nicholls’ carving of Bazin, Aramis’ valet.

=== Thomas Nicholls’ frieze and carvings ===
"Rip Van Winkle" and characters from The Last of the Mohicans and The Scarlet Letter are depicted in a frieze in the main hall. This frieze was also executed by Thomas Nicholls. Two of the figures are from the Leatherstocking novels of James Fenimore Cooper, the first being The Last of the Mohicans the nickname of Uncas, a leading character in the book. The second statue is that of "The Pathfinder", one of the names given to Leatherstocking (otherwise Natty Bumppo). Next Nathaniel Hawthorne’s Scarlet Letter is represented by Hester Prynne and the Reverend Arthur Dimmesdale. The two remaining characters are Washington Irving’s Rip Van Winkle and his daughter. At the feet of Rip Van Winkle is his dog and at those of his daughter is the gnomes’ keg of liquor, the drinking of which had sent Van Winkle into his long slumber and freedom from his bothersome wife for 20 years!

The staircase hall is overlooked by a gallery that features statues made by Nicholls, having American literary associations, and a frieze in relief which features 82 characters from Shakespeare’s Othello, Henry VIII, Antony and Cleopatra and Macbeth. Around this gallery are ten pillars of solid ebony. The statues are positioned on six of the carved oak panels which surmount these pillars. The ceiling of the staircase Hall and Gallery is in stained glass, coved and panelled.

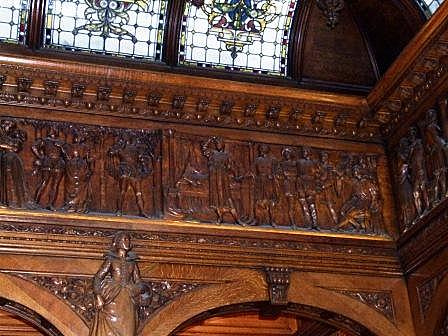

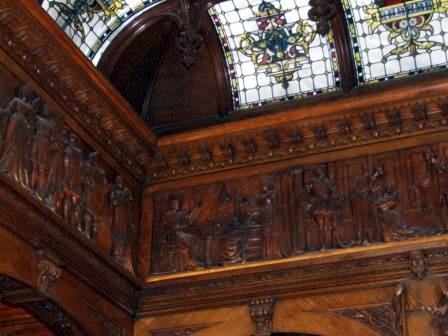

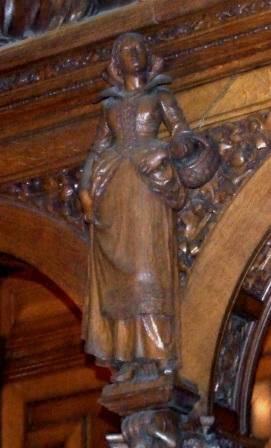

== The Great Hall ==
=== Study or library ===
Astor's study, located off the gallery and overlooking the Thames, held his vast collection of collectible books and art. It was also home to business meetings. The room was described by a London area architect thus:

There is no more curious room in London than this hall which was intended by its creator to be a sort of temple to culture and expresses in a curious way his own tastes in art and literature.

From the pencil cedar panel walls, 35-foot mahogany ceilings and doors, Astor adorned the room with Spanish mahogany panelling, carving, such as the Four Musketeers and decorations. Accoutrements of the room included marble floors, Persian rugs, chandeliers, and portraits of himself and his ancestors. Located by his desk in the library was a spinning wheel of New England.

=== Sir George Frampton’s panels ===
The entrance door to the Great Hall is made of mahogany, has a beautifully carved head and nine decorative panels in silver gilt by Sir George James Frampton. These panels, which were exhibited at the Royal Academy prior to installation in the house, depict in low relief the nine heroines of the Arthurian Legend, to Thomas Malory’s version, of which Tennyson gave a new interpretation. The first two panels depict the "Lady of the Isle of Avelyon" and "Elaine" ("The lily maid of Astolat"). The third, fourth and fifth panels depict "The Lady of the Lake", "Morgan le Fay" and "Guinevere" (for whom "A man had given all other bliss/And all his worldly worth for this/To waste his whole heart in one kiss/Upon her perfect lips"). The sixth, seventh and eighth panels depict "La Beale Isoude", "Lyonors" and "Enid". The ninth and final panel depicts "Alis la Beale Pilgrim".

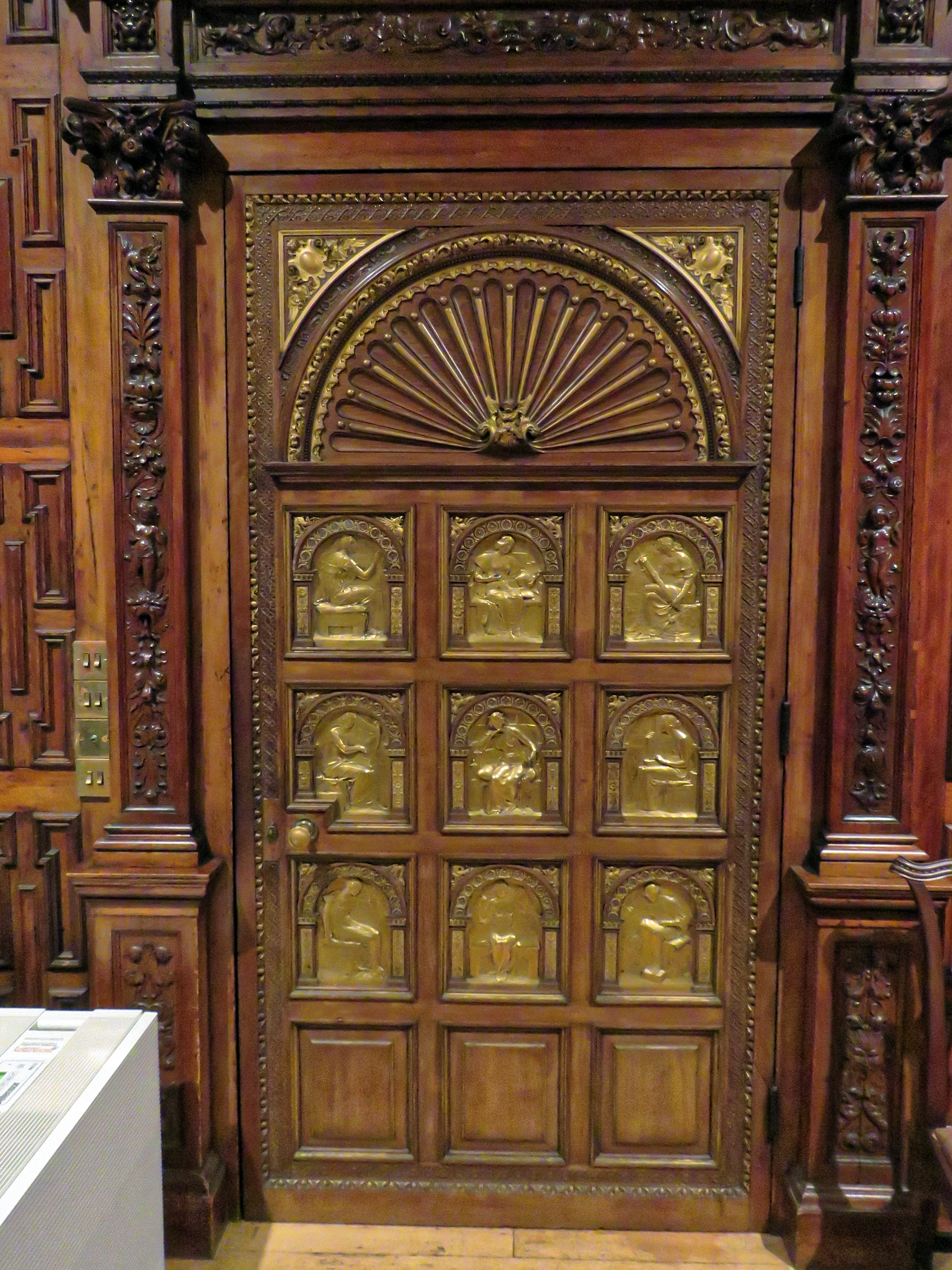

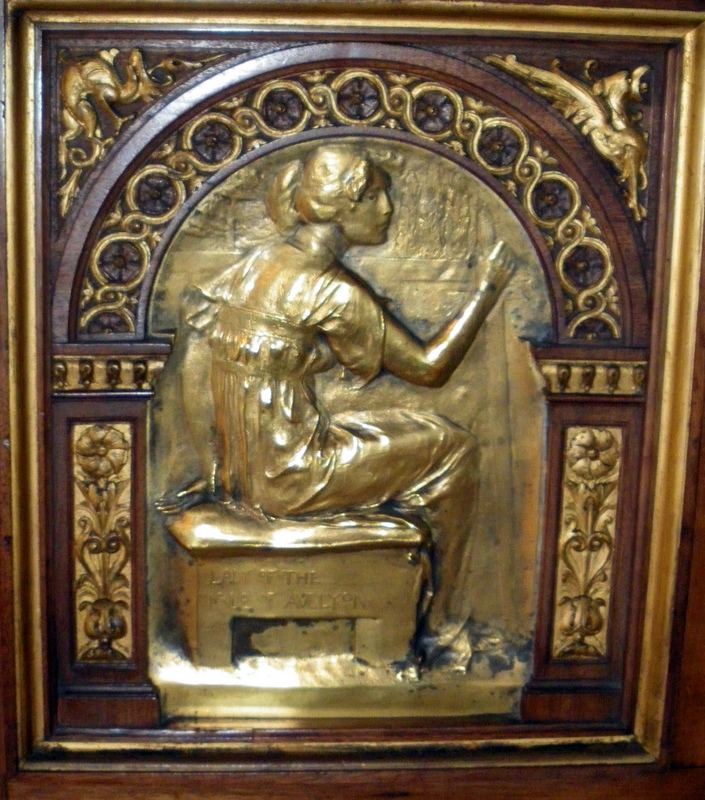
The Lady of the Isle of Avelyon

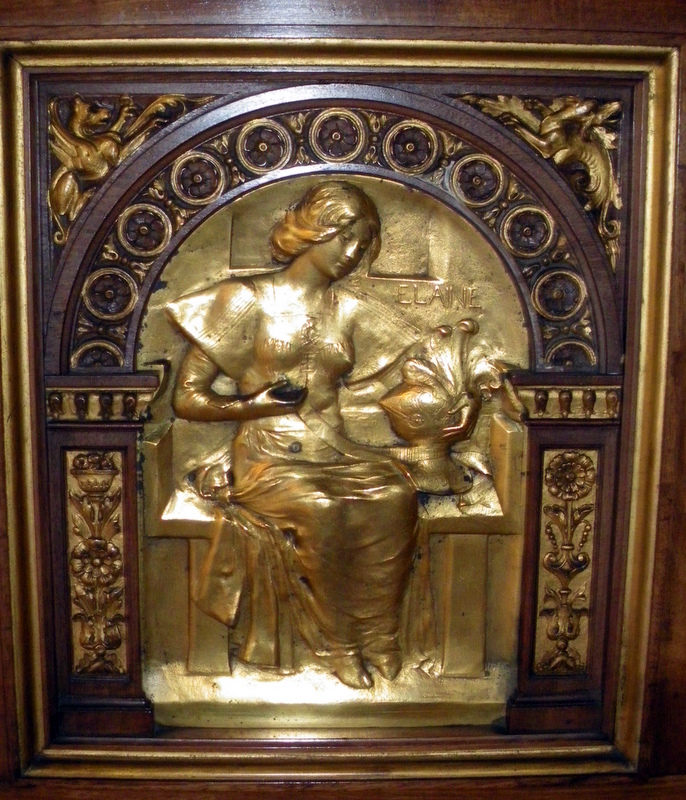
Elaine, the lily maid of Astolat

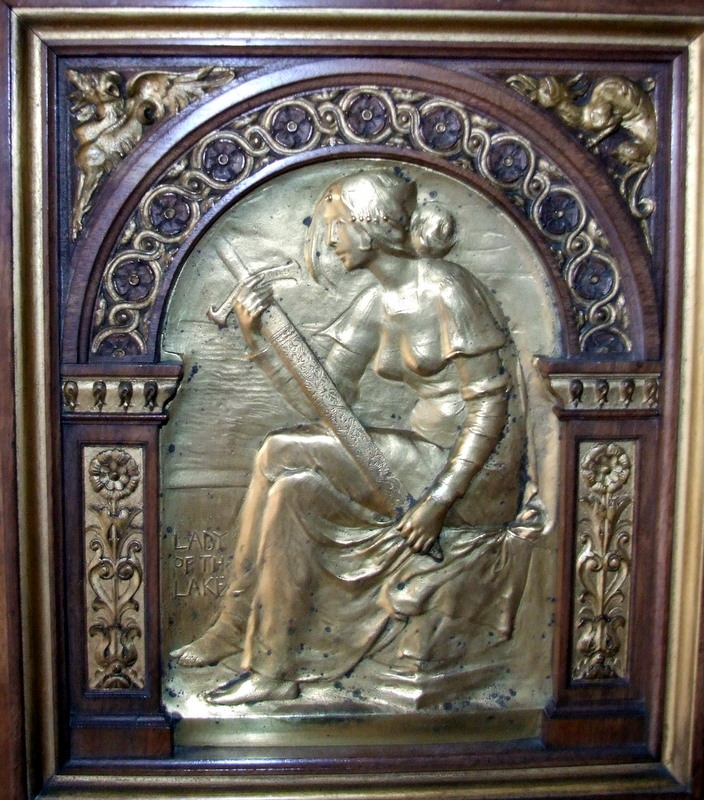
The Lady of the Lake

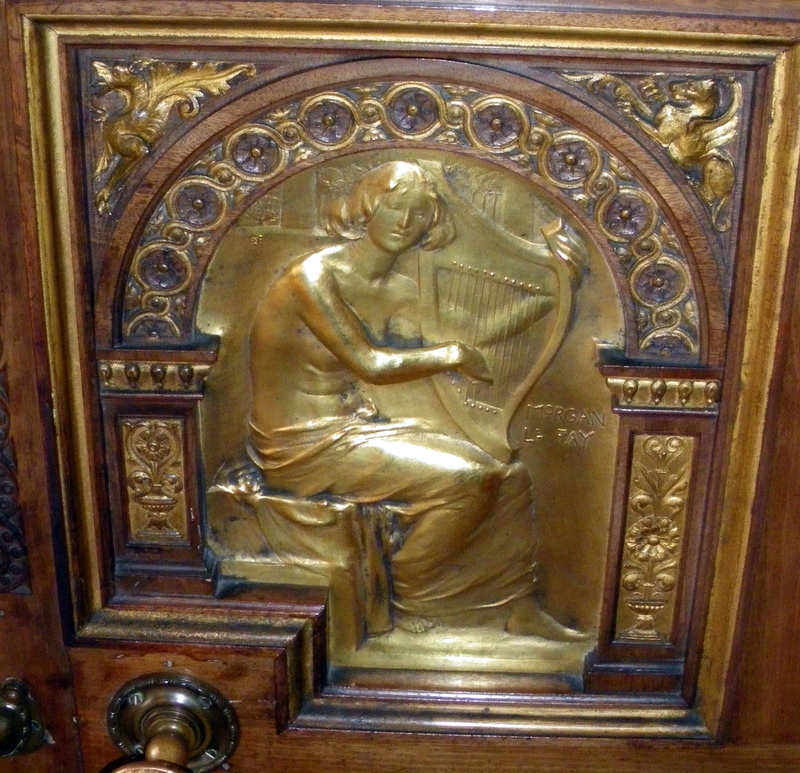
Morgan le Fay

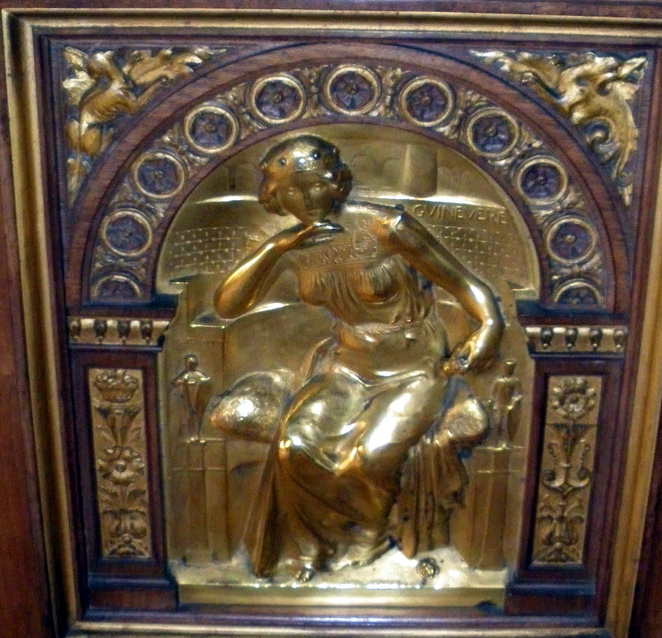
Guinevere

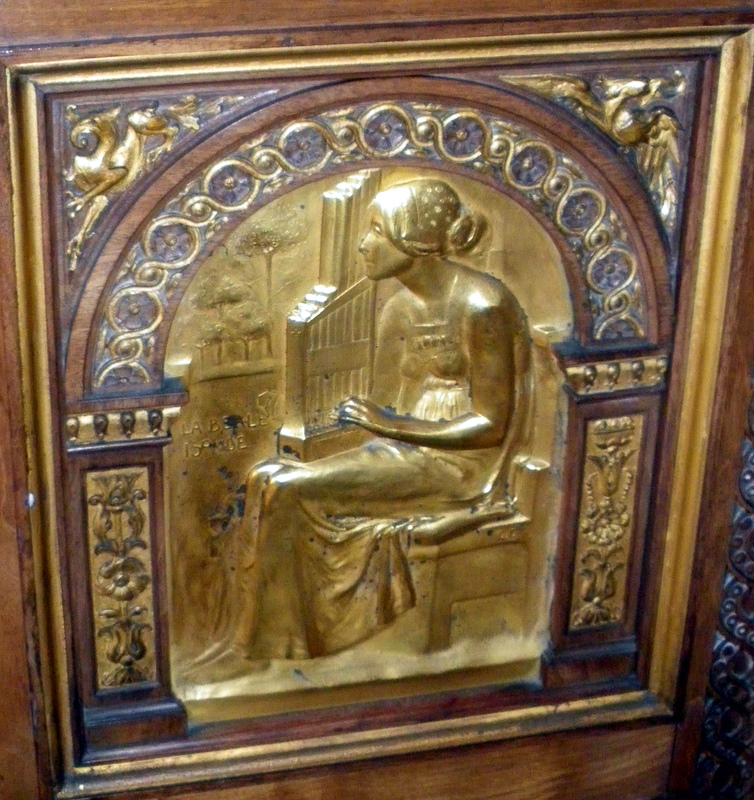
La Beale Isoude

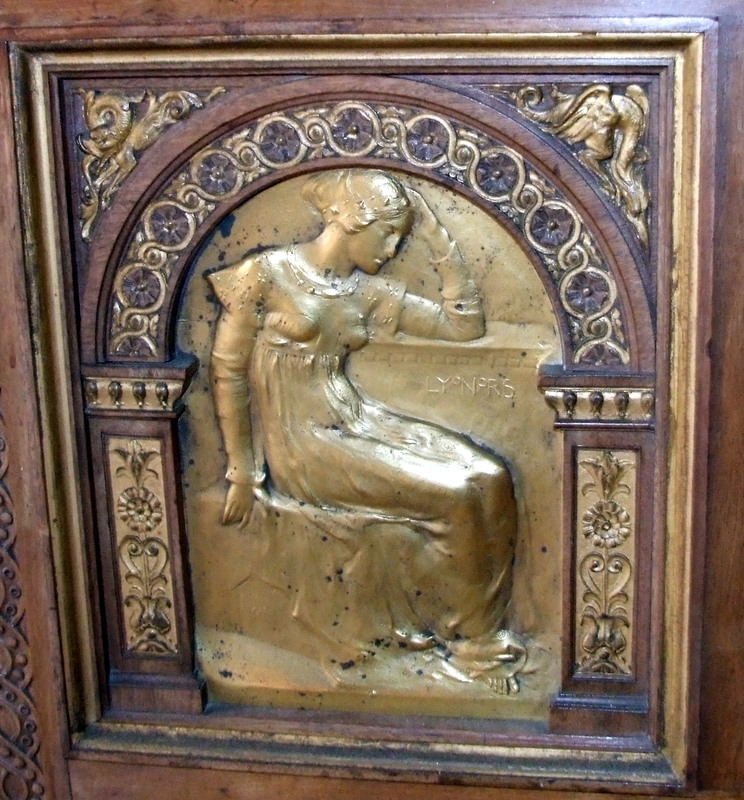
Lyonors

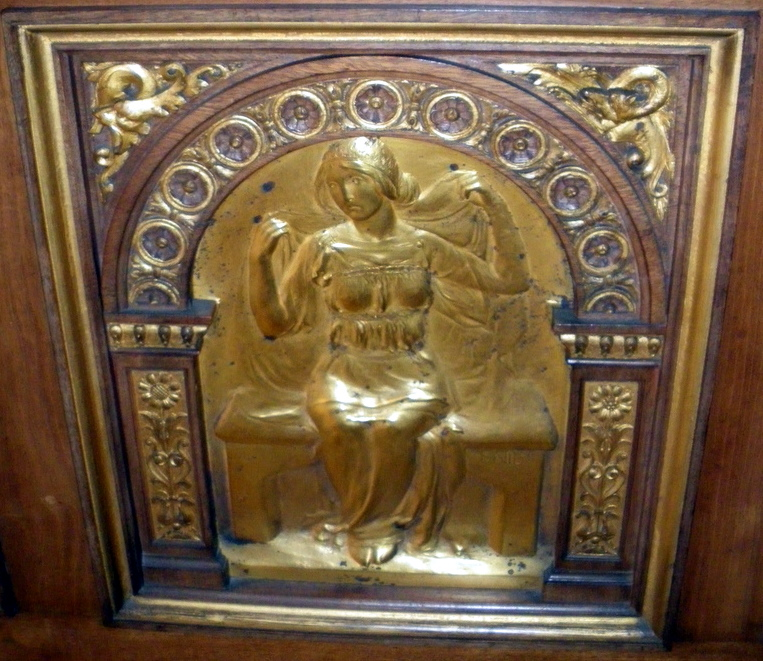
Enid

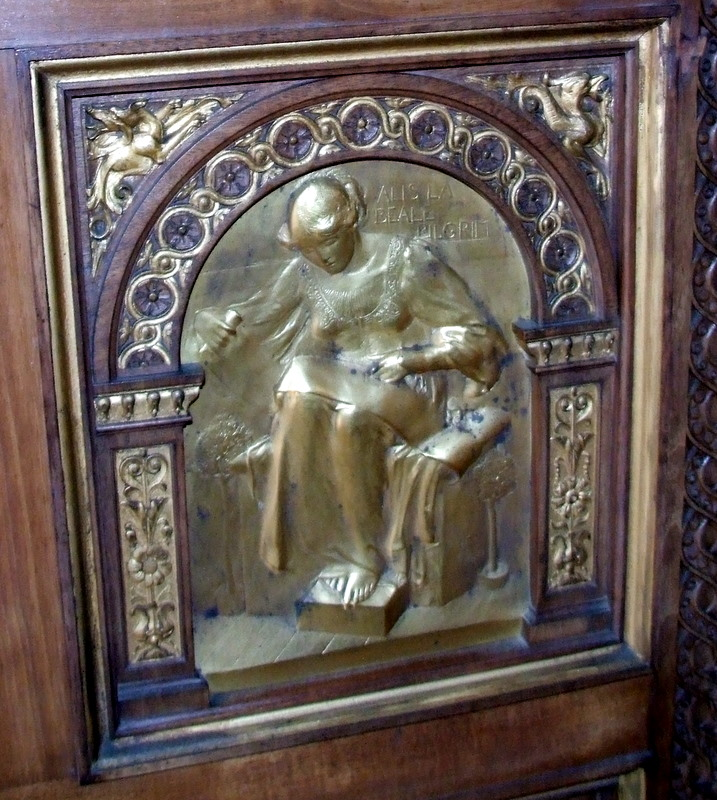
Alis la Beale Pilgrim

=== Nathaniel Hitch’s frieze ===
The Great Hall extends the whole length of the building on the river front. The walls are panelled in pencil cedar and surmounted by a frieze in which fifty-four portraits of the heads of characters famous in history and fiction, have been modelled, carved in low relief and then gilded. These 54 portraits are by the sculptor Nathaniel Hitch. The Hall is 35 feet high to the ridge and open to a hammer-beam type roof, a notable example of modern Gothic timber work made from carved Spanish mahogany.

The frieze portraits include Juliet, Queen Louise of Prussia and Richard Coeur de Lion

Above the frieze and standing within tracery canopies under the roof principals are twelve carved figures from literature, including Ivanhoe, Robin Hood and Maid Marian. At either end of the Great Hall are carved pencil cedar chimney pieces and at one end there are some bench ends carved by Hitch these being fine examples of his work. Photographs of these carvings are included in the album of photographs of Hitch's work held at the Henry Moore Archive in Leeds.

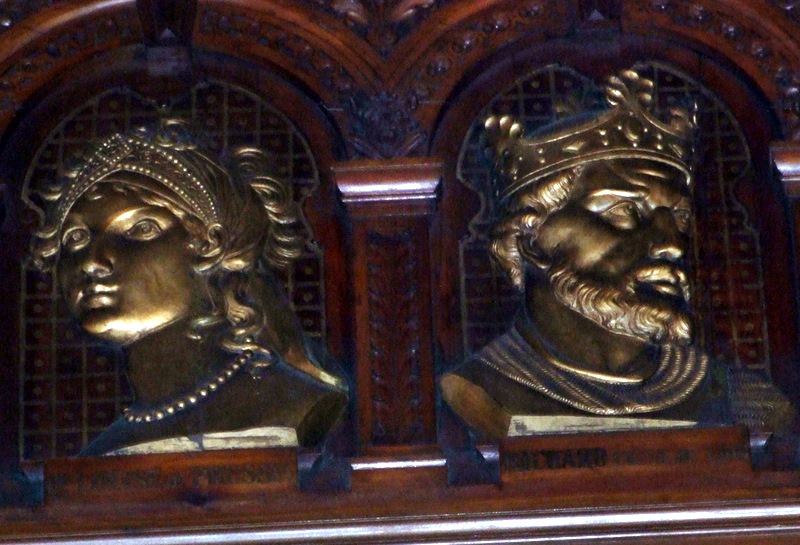
Two further Hitch portraits from the Great Hall.

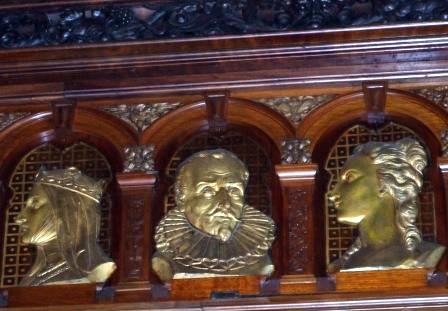
Three further Hitch portraits from the Great Hall.

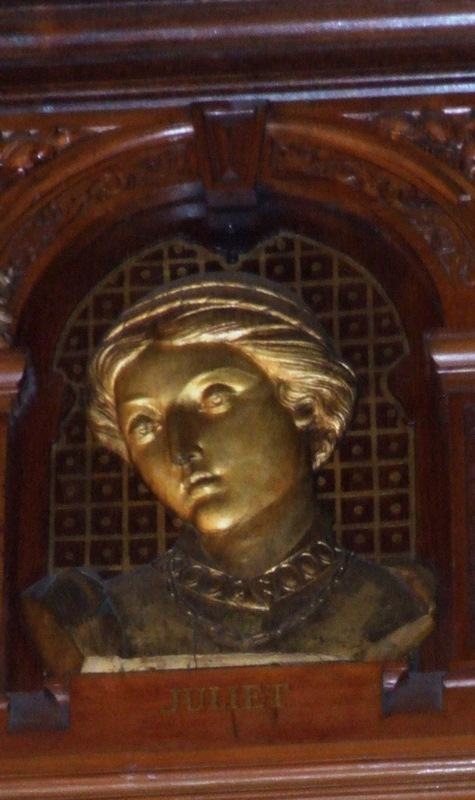
Juliet's portrait by Hitch in the Great Hall frieze.

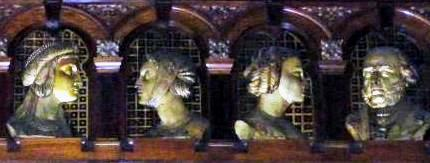
Another photograph of Hitch’s carvings on the frieze in the Great Hall.

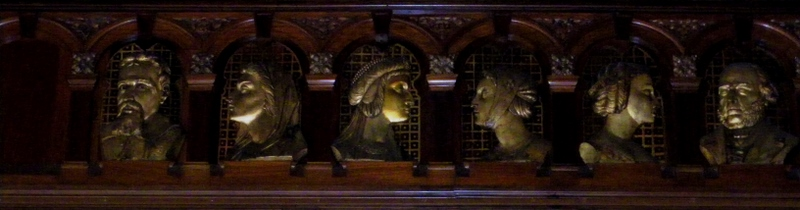
Another photograph of Hitch’s carvings on the frieze in the Great Hall.

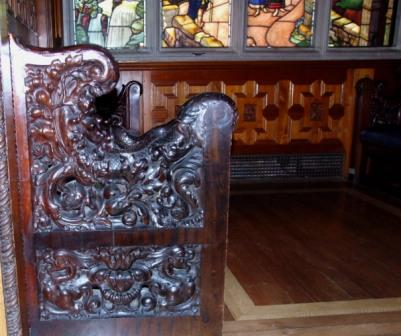
Hitch carving on seat-end.

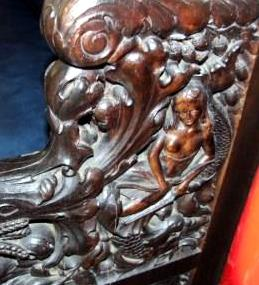
close-up of Hitch carving on seat-end.

=== Stained-glass windows ===
At the eastern and western ends of the Great Hall are stained-glass windows which are the work of Clayton and Bell. One of these is called A Swiss Summer Landscape and includes Thun Castle in the Swiss Canton of Bern. Clayton and Bell often collaborated with John Loughborough Pearson, their other work including the stained-glass windows at Truro Cathedral.

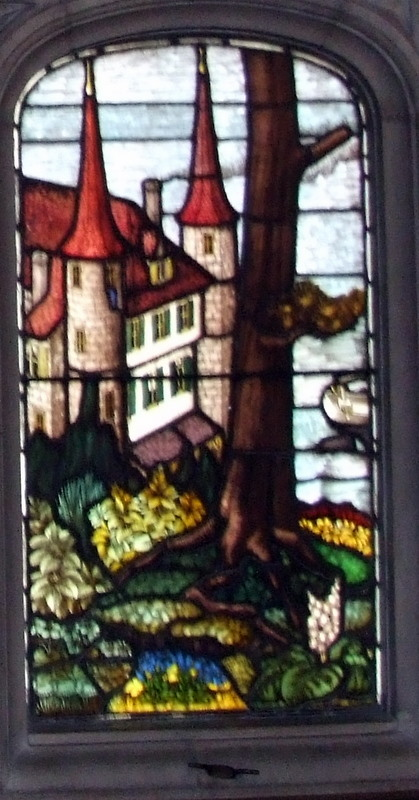
Panel of stained-glass window.

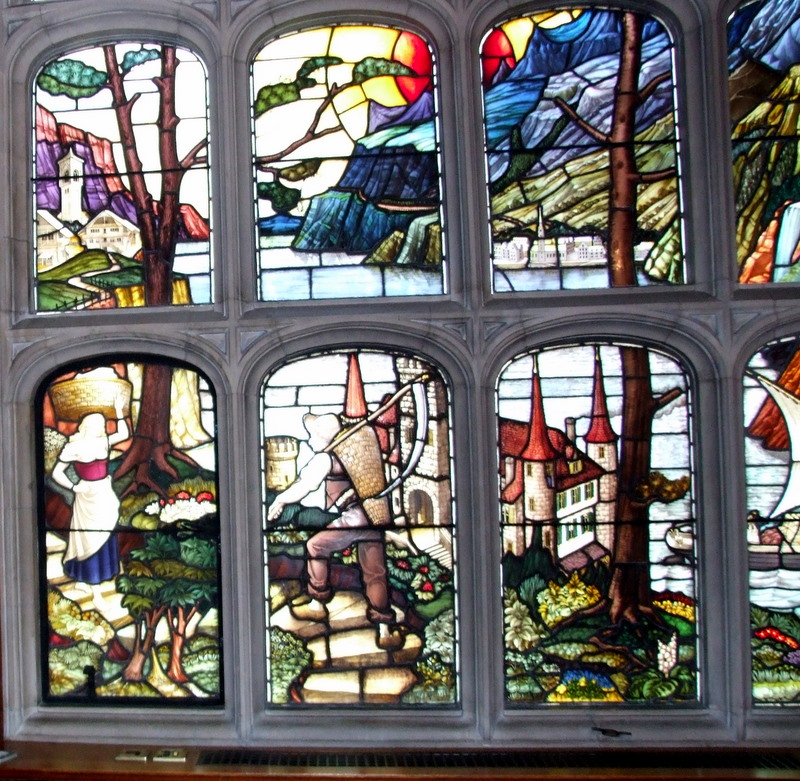
Part of stained-glass window.

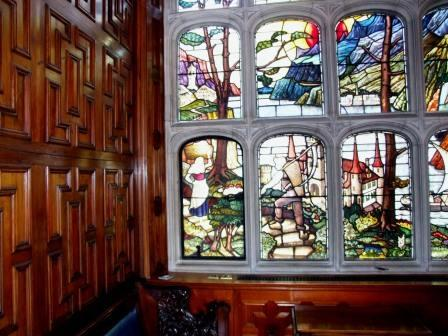
View of one of Clayton and Bell’s stained-glass windows.

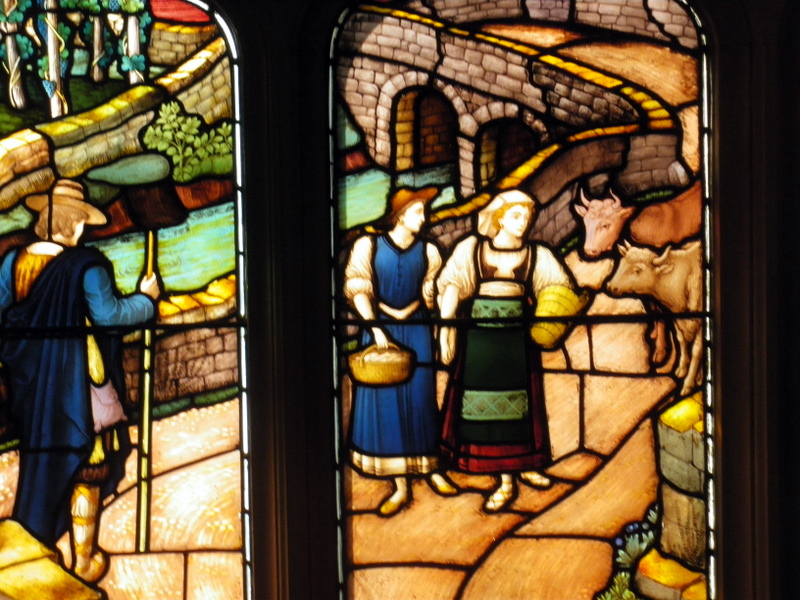
One of the panels.

== Gallery ==
=== Exterior ===
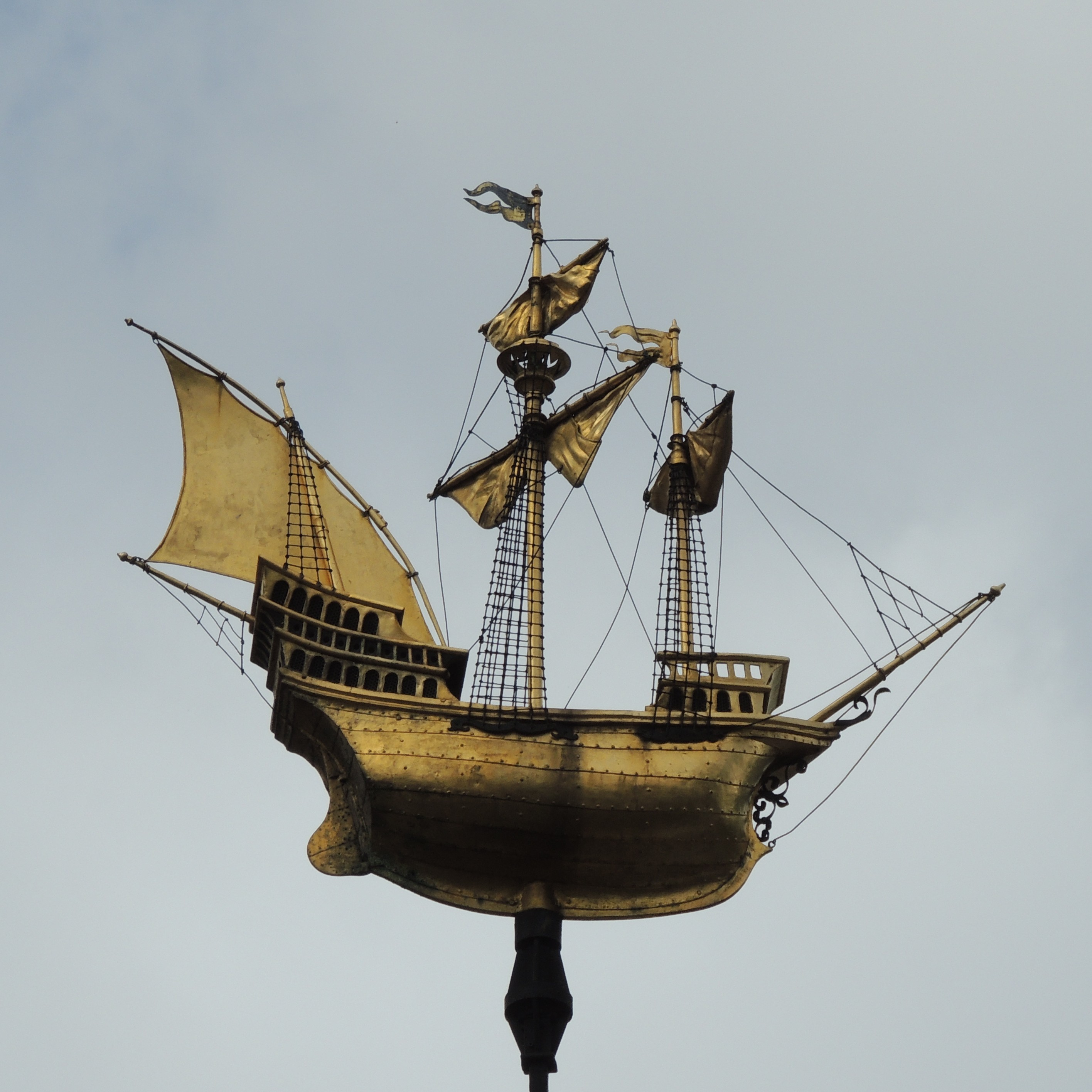
J. Starkie Gardner’s weather vane

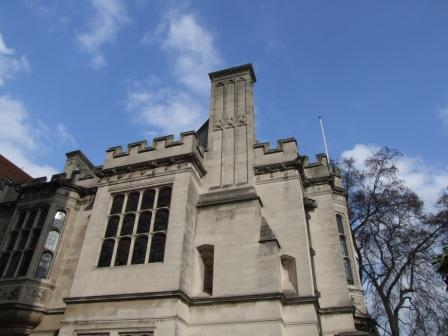
Exterior view of 2 Temple Place showing machicolated parapets.

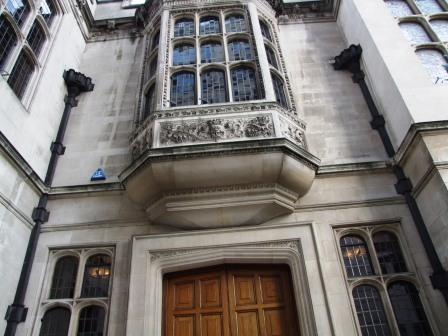
View of portico with good example of Nathaniel Hitch carving in stone-work.

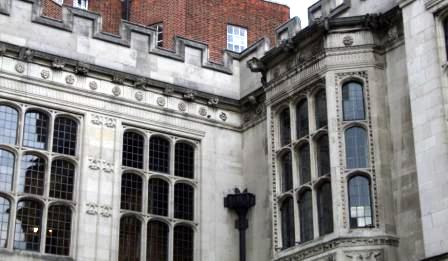
Another view of exterior of building

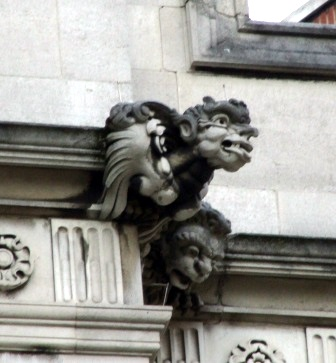
Nathaniel Hitch “Grotesque”

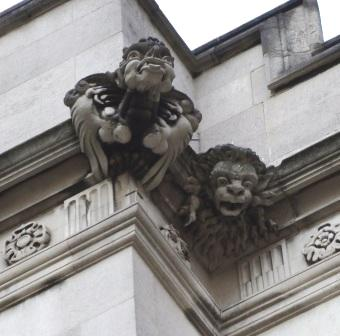
Another Nathaniel Hitch “Grotesque”

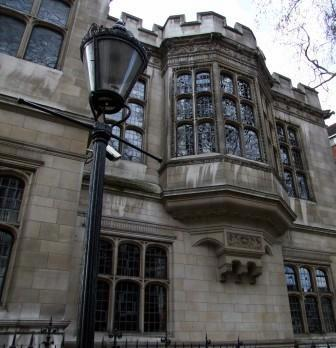
Exterior of 2 Temple Place

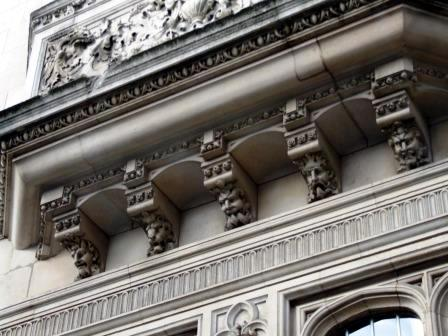
Nathaniel Hitch carvings on exterior.

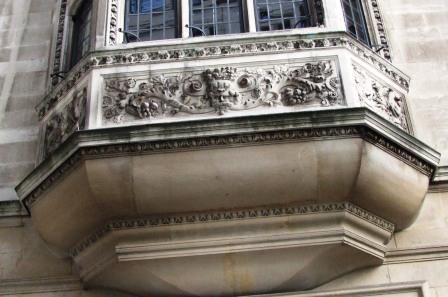
Nathaniel Hitch carving over 2 Temple Place entrance.

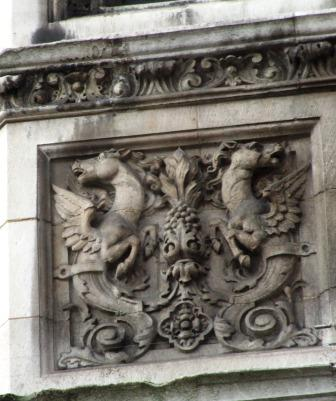
Example of intricacy of Hitch’s carvings

=== Interior ===
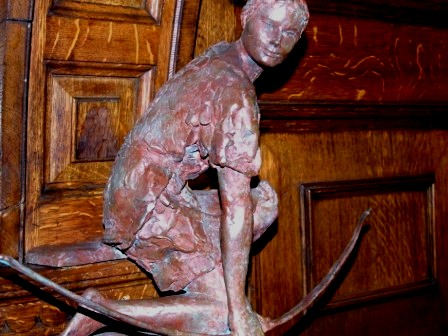
One of seven “Robin Hood” themed bronzes on main staircase.

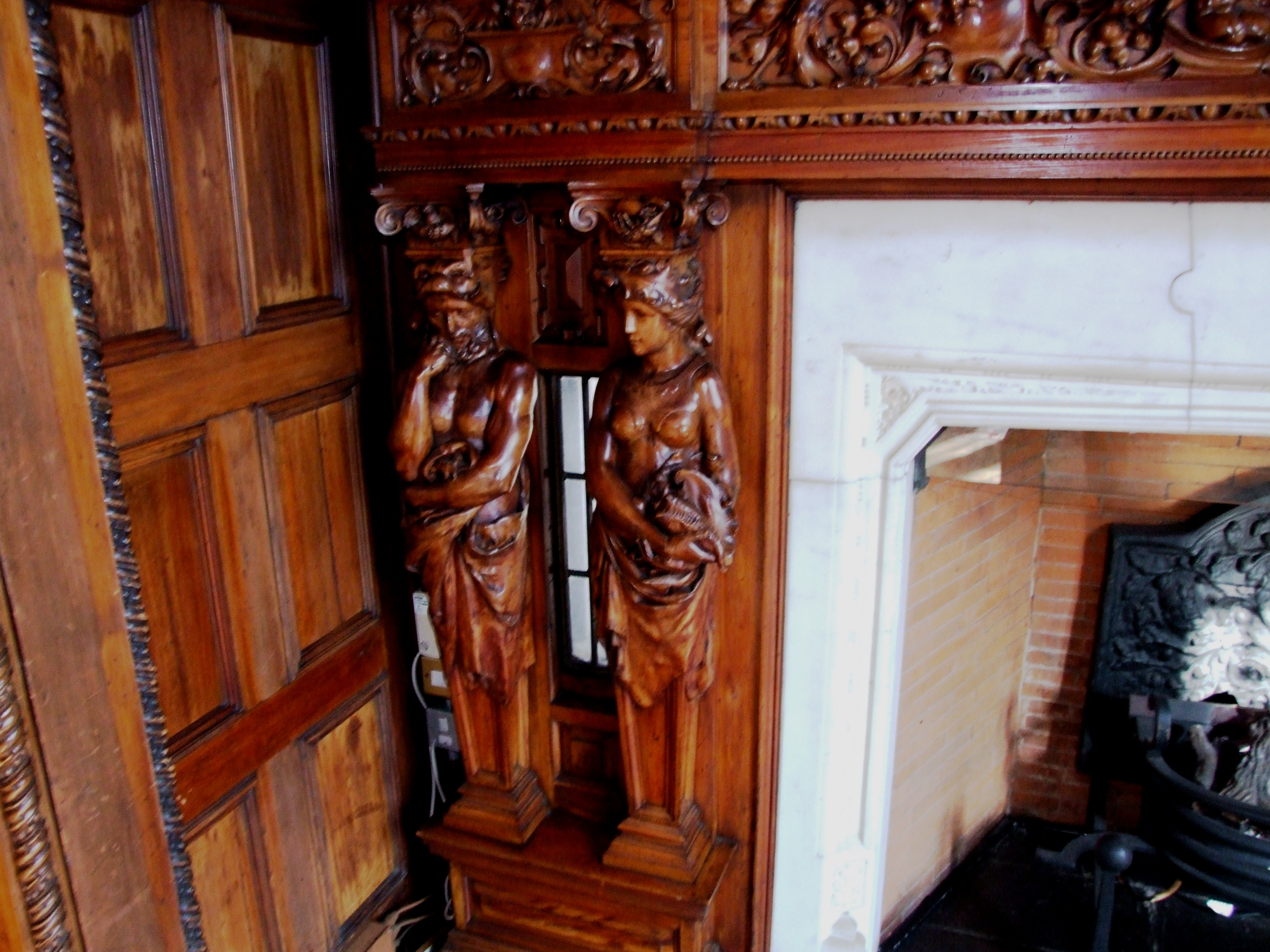
Carvings on fireplace.
