= Jawahar Shah =

Indian homeopath

Jawahar J Shah
- Born: 9 June 1955
- Occupation: Homeopath
- Website: https://drjawaharshah.com/

Jawahar Shah (born 1955), is an Indian homeopath. He graduated from CMPH Medical College in 1976. He is a classical homoeopath, and has been practicing homoeopathy for more than 45 years.

Shah has taught homoeopathy at the national and international levels, and has organised many seminars in various countries. He is a former Member of the Central Council of Homoeopathy, Ministry of Health and Family Welfare, Government of India.

Shah is a pioneer in homoeopathic software development and has to his credit the development of Hompath. One of the major software programs used by homeopaths in 140 countries globally, Shah is also the founder of world's 1st and largest Homeopathy Telemedicine portal. www.welcomecure.com
