= Rina Zazkis =

Academic background
- Education: B.A, M.A., University of Haifa; PhD, 1989, Israel Institute of Technology

Academic work
- Institutions: Northern Illinois University; Simon Fraser University

Rina Zazkis is a Canadian scholar in education and mathematics. She is a professor in the Faculty of Education at Simon Fraser University and a Canada Research Chair in STEM Teaching and Learning.

== Career ==
Zazkis began her academic career at Simon Fraser University (SFU) in 1991 as an assistant professor. She was eventually promoted to full professor in the Faculty of Education by 2000. In 2011, she was a recipient of the Dean of Graduate Studies Awards for Excellence.

In 2017, she was appointed a Canada Research Chair in STEM Teaching and Learning. Two years later she received the 2019 Partners In Research National Award.
