= Bishwa Bahadur Shah =

Nepalese-American politician

Member-elect of the New Hampshire House of Representatives from the Hillsborough 41st district
- Assuming office December 2026
- Succeeding: Tim Hartnett

Personal details
- Born: Nepal
- Party: Democratic

Bishwa Bahadur Shah is a Nepalese-American politician. A member of the Democratic Party, he is the member-elect for the Hillsborough 41st district of the New Hampshire House of Representatives.
