= Rina Shah =

American political strategist

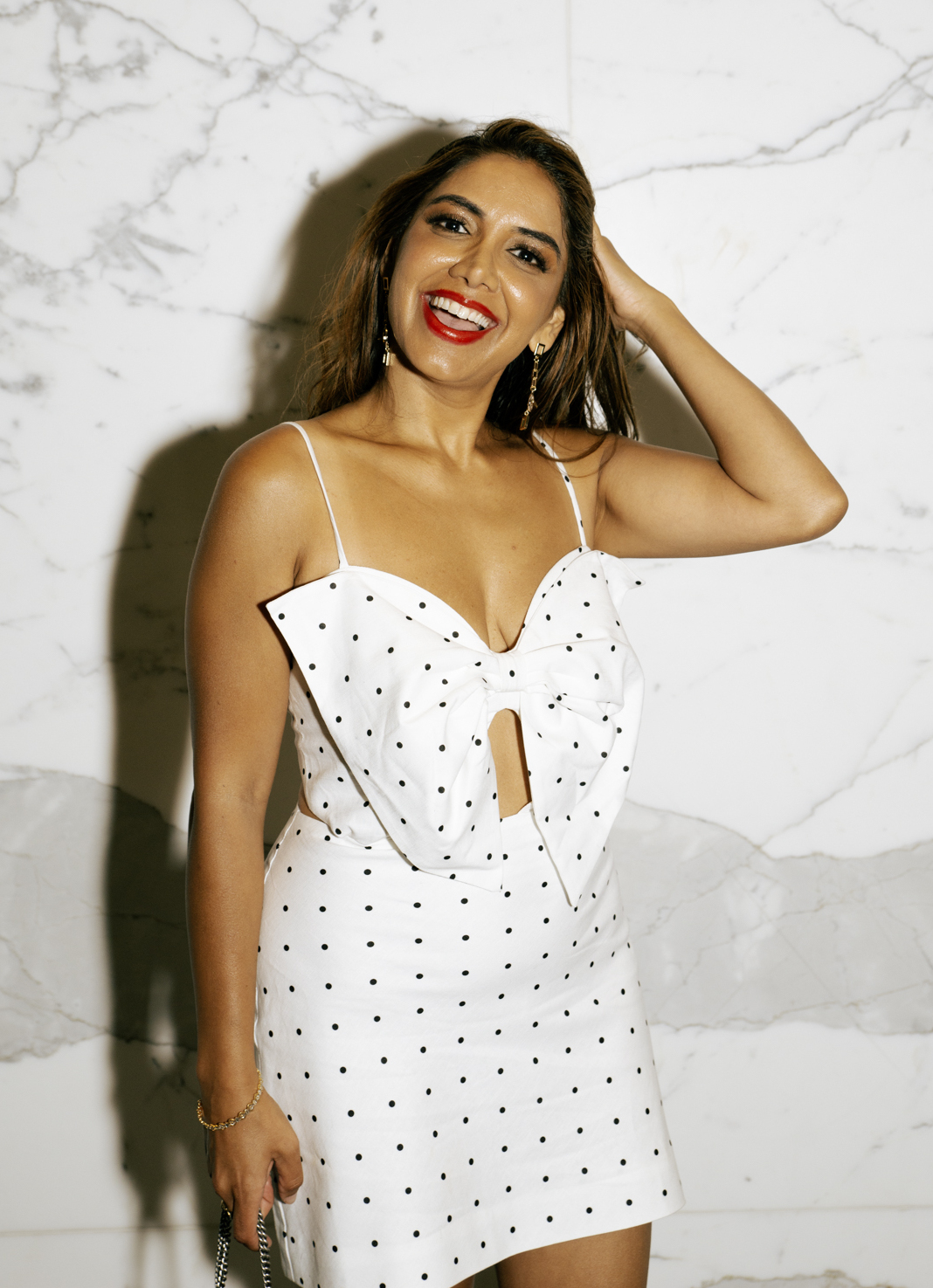
- Shah in 2025
- Born: West Virginia, US
- Occupations: Political strategist, commentator, consultant
- Political party: Republican
- Spouse: Niteesh Bharara
- Website: www.runwithrina.com

Rina Shah is an American political strategist, commentator, and consultant. A Republican, she is the founder of Rilax Strategies and co-founder of Catalyst PAC, an organization established to recruit diverse candidates for the Republican Party. Shah garnered national attention during the 2016 presidential election for her vocal opposition to Donald Trump, which led to a dispute over her status as a convention delegate.

== Early life ==
Shah was born in West Virginia and raised in the southern part of the state. She is Indian American. Her father, Rajnikant Shah, and his family lived in Uganda for nearly four generations. In 1972, the family was forced to leave Uganda after president Idi Amin ordered the expulsion of Asians. Although they were ordered to return to India, the family instead immigrated to the United States. Shah has cited this family history of displacement by an oppressive government as a key reason for her identification with the Republican Party. She identifies as both Hindu and Jain and has Muslim family members.

== Career ==
Shah worked as a senior staffer for two members of the U.S. Congress. She subsequently founded Rilax Strategies, a political consulting firm based in Washington, D.C. She has served as an advisor to VoteRunLead and was an inaugural member of the House Republican Conference's Indian American Advisory Council.

=== 2016 U.S. presidential election ===
During the 2016 presidential election, Shah became a critic of Republican nominee Donald Trump. In an April 2016 appearance on Fox News, she stated that she would consider voting for Democratic nominee Hillary Clinton over Trump, a comment that attracted significant attention from conservative commentators.

Shah was elected as a District of Columbia delegate to the 2016 Republican National Convention. However, following a report by Breitbart News that questioned whether she resided in D.C. or Virginia, the executive committee of the D.C. Republican Party voted 14 to 6 to strip her of her delegate status. Shah contested this removal, and the Republican National Committee's convention contest committee ultimately recommended her reinstatement. The committee criticized the D.C. party leadership for a "lack of due process" and for failing to follow standard protocols regarding residency assessment.

During the campaign, Shah received a graphic and racist voicemail from a Trump supporter identified as Alan Pryce, who called her a "slut" and an "Islamic dog." Shah allowed independent conservative candidate Evan McMullin to use the recording in an anti-Trump campaign advertisement.

=== Later work ===
Following the 2016 election, Shah co-founded Catalyst PAC, an organization aimed at making the Republican Party more inclusive by recruiting diverse congressional candidates. The organization's sponsors included T-Mobile, Univision, and former congressman Phil English.

In May 2025, she appeared on NPR to discuss Republican budget reconciliation efforts and proposed changes to Medicaid.

== Personal life ==
In 2016, Fairfax County public records indicated that Shah was married to doctor Niteesh Bharara, with whom she jointly owned a home in Reston, Virginia.
