= List of Nepali political clans =

Many families in Nepal have produced multiple generations of politicians who have played a significant role in shaping the government and the country as a whole. This article lists some of the most notable political families in Nepal along with their prominent members and relatives. The list does not include all family members.

== Thapa (Bhimsen Thapa) ==
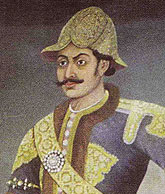
Bhimsen Thapa, an influential member of Thapa dynasty

Two families of Bagale Thapa clan were influential. One was the Birbhadra or Bhimsen family and other was Badakaji Amar Singh Thapa's family.

- Virbhadra Thapa (Kaji)
  - Jeevan Thapa
  - Bangsha Raj Thapa
  - Amar Singh Thapa (born 1759) (Sanukaji)
    - Bhimsen Thapa (Mukhtiyar)
    - Nain Singh Thapa (General Kaji)
      - Ganesh Kumari Kunwar
      - Queen Tripurasundari of Nepal
      - Ujir Singh Thapa (Colonel Kaji)
      - Mathabar Singh Thapa (PM C-in-C)
    - Bhaktabar Singh Thapa (Colonel Kaji)
    - Amrit Singh Thapa (Colonel Kaji)
    - Ranabir Singh Thapa (General Kaji)

Other notable connected members

- Jung Bahadur Rana, Bam Bahadur Kunwar, Ranodip Singh Kunwar and their 4 other brothers, were grandson of Kaji Nain Singh through his daughter Ganesh Kumari.
- Ranajit Pande, maternal grandfather of Ganesh Kumari, mother of Jung Bahadur Rana

== Pande ==
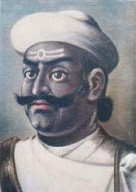
Damodar Pande, Mulkaji of Nepal from the Pande family

- Ganesh Pandey (Kaji of Gorkha)
  - Kalu Pande (Kaji of Gorkha), descendant of Ganesh Pande
    - Bamsa Raj Pandey (Dewankaji)
    - Damodar Pande (Mulkaji)
      - Rana Jang Pande (Mukhtiyar)
        - Bhim Bahadur Pande, seventh descendant of Kalu Pande
          - Prithvi Bahadur Pande, son of Bhim Bahadur
  - Tularam Pande (Kaji), descendant of Ganesh Pande
    - Ranajit Pande (Mulkaji), son of Tularam Pande
      - Dalbhanjan Pande, (Kaji), grandson of Tularam Pande

Other notable connected members

- Kehar Singh Basnyat was Kalu Pande's son-in-law.
- Kirtiman Singh Basnyat and Bakhtawar Singh Basnyat were grandsons of Kaji Kalu Pande through his daughter Chitra Devi.
- Nain Singh Thapa, son-in-law of Ranajit Pande.

== Basnyat ==
Shreepali clan of Basnet were influential in the 18th-19th century.

- Shivaram Singh Basnyat (Senapati Badabir)
  - Naahar Singh Basnyat (Kaji)
  - Kehar Singh Basnyat (Kaji)
    - Kirtiman Singh Basnyat (Mulkaji)
    - Bakhtawar Singh Basnyat (Mulkaji)
  - Abhiman Singh Basnyat (Mulkaji)
  - Dhokal Singh Basnyat (Governor)

Other notable connected members

- Kalu Pande was father-in-law of Kehar Singh Basnyat.

== Kunwar ==
- Ahirama Kunwar
  - Sardar Ramakrishna Kunwar of Gorkha Kingdom
    - Kaji Ranajit Kunwar of Gorkha Kingdom
      - Kaji Bal Narsingh Kunwar
      - Kaji Balaram Kunwar
      - Kaji Rewanta Bahadur Kunwar
  - Jaya Krishna Kunwar
    - Sardar Chandrabir Kunwar
      - Birbhadra Kunwar
      - Captain Balbhadra Kunwar of Nalapani

== Thapa (Amar Singh Thapa) ==
Second influential family of Bagale Thapa clan; the other being Thapa dynasty.

- Bagh Bhim Singh Thapa (Umrao)
  - Kaji Amar Singh Thapa (Bada)
    - Kaji Ranadhoj Thapa
      - Kaji Ripumardan Thapa
      - Kaji Badal Singh Thapa
    - Bhaktabir Thapa
    - Narsingh Thapa
    - Ramdas Thapa
    - Kaji Ranajor Singh Thapa
    - Arjun Singh Thapa
    - Bhupal Singh Thapa

Connected Members

- Jharana Thapa, wife of eighth descendant of Bada Kaji

== Chautariya (Chandrarup Shah) ==
Chautariyas are non-throne lineage descendants of Shah dynasty.

- King Prithvipati Shah of Gorkha Kingdom
  - Adhirajakumar Chandrarup Shah of Gorkha Kingdom
    - Vishnurup Shah
      - Kaji Jiva Shah
        - Chautariya Prana Shah
          - Mukhtiyar Chautariya Fatya Jung Shah
        - Mukhtiyar Chautariya Pushkar Shah
    - Birbaha Shah
      - Chautariya Bam Shah
      - Chautariya Hasti Dal Shah

== Thapa (Bhakti Thapa) ==
- Bhakti Thapa, Nepalese Sardar
  - Arjun Bahadur Thapa, eighth descendant of Bhakti Thapa

== Rana ==
- Bal Narsingh Kunwar
  - Bhaktabir Kunwar
  - Jung Bahadur Kunwar Rana
    - Jagat Jang Rana
  - Bam Bahadur Kunwar
  - Badri Narsingh Kunwar
  - Jaya Bahadur Kunwar
  - Krishna Bahadur Kunwar
  - Ranodip Singh Kunwar
  - Jagat Shamsher Kunwar
  - Dhir Shamsher Kunwar Rana
    - Bir Shamsher Jang Bahadur Rana
    - Khadga Shamsher Jang Bahadur Rana
    - Rana Shamsher Jang Bahadur Rana
    - Dev Shamsher Jang Bahadur Rana
    - Chandra Shamsher Jang Bahadur Rana
      - Mohan Shamsher Jang Bahadur Rana
        - Bijay Shamsher Jang Bahadur Rana
          - Pashupati Shamsher Jang Bahadur Rana
            - Devyani Rana
      - Baber Shamsher Jang Bahadur Rana
            - Udaya Shumsher Rana, great-grandson of Baber
      - Kaiser Shamsher Jang Bahadur Rana
    - Bhim Shamsher Jang Bahadur Rana
      - Padma Shamsher Jang Bahadur Rana
      - Subarna Shamsher Rana
    - Juddha Shamsher Jang Bahadur Rana
      - Kiran Shamsher Rana

== Poudyal ==
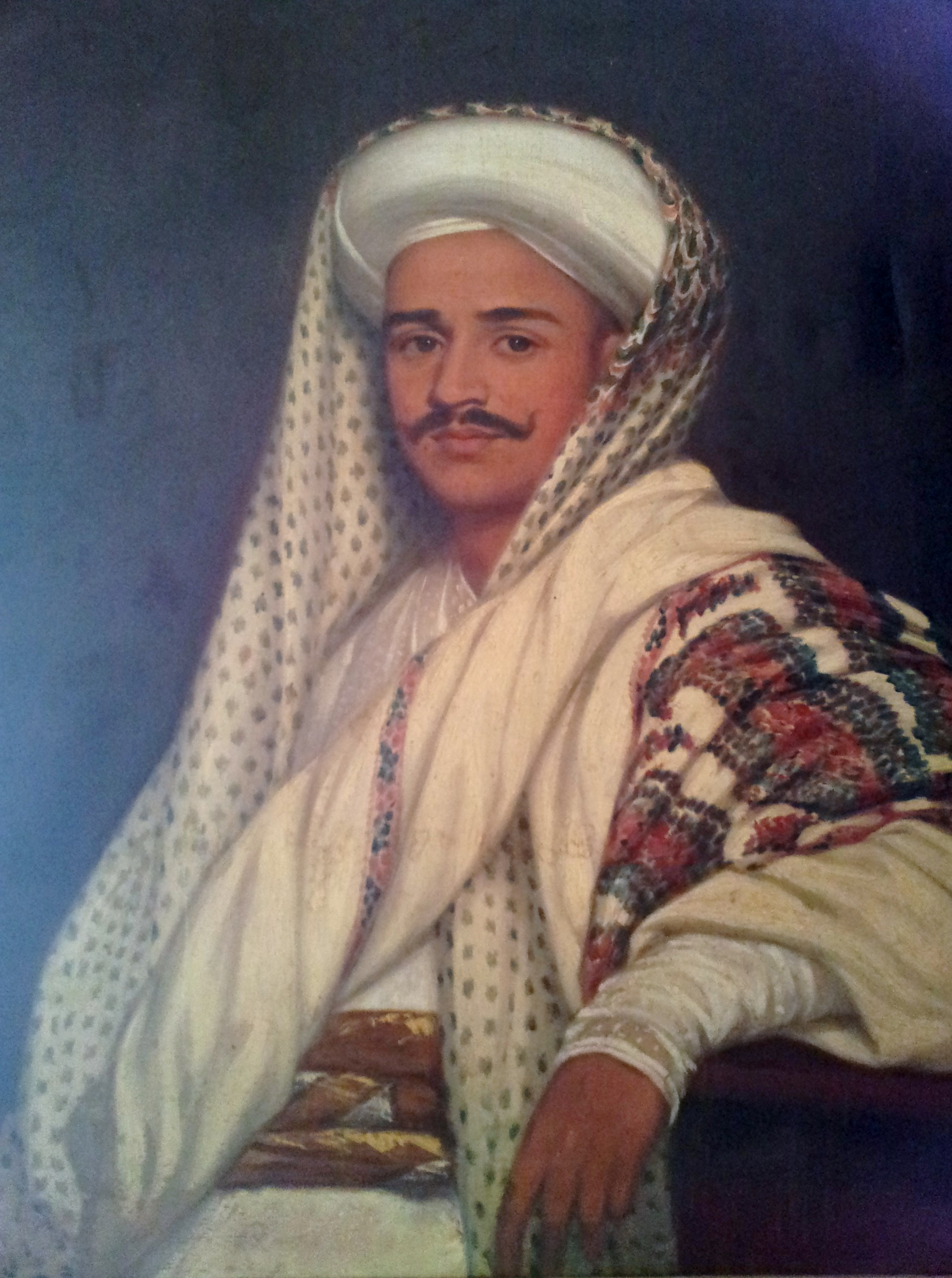
Ranga Nath Poudyal, Mukhtiyar of Nepal from the Poudyal family

The Poudyal family was influential in 18th–19th century Nepal, descending from Jayamangala Poudyal, an Agnihotri and Sanskrit scholar. His son, Vrajanath Poudyal was a tutor to King Pratap Singh Shah, as well as a Tantric, Sanskrit scholar, and prominent courtier. His son, Ranganath Poudyal served twice as Mukhtiyar.

Jayamangala Poudyal (Scholar)
  - Vrajanath Poudyal (Courtier)
    - Ranganath Poudyal (Mukhtiyar)

== Koirala ==
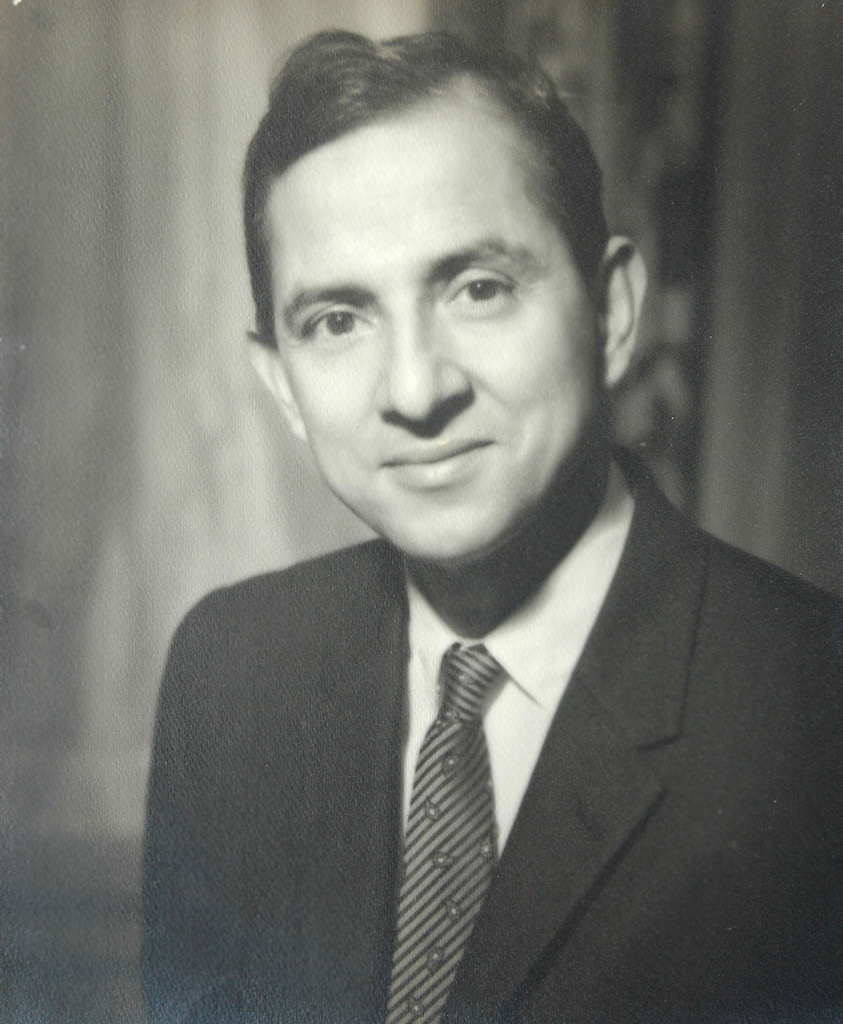
B. P. Koirala, one of the leading members of the influential Koirala family

- Krishna Prasad Koirala (father of 3 ex PMs of Nepal: Matrika, BP & Girija)
  - Matrika Prasad Koirala ex. prime minister
  - Bishweshwar Prasad Koirala ex. prime minister
    - Prakash Koirala royalist politician, son of BP
      - Manisha Koirala Bollywood actress, grand daughter of BP
      - Siddharth Koirala Bollywood actor, grandson of BP
    - Dr. Shashanka Koirala politician, Son of BP
  - Keshav Prasad Koirala
    - Dr. Shekhar Koirala, nephew of BP
  - Tarini Prasad Koirala, journalist
  - Girija Prasad Koirala ex. prime minister
    - Sujata Koirala ex. deputy prime minister, daughter of GP

Other notable connected members

- Sushil Koirala (ex PM & ex. president of Nepali congress) (Cousin of Matrika, BP & Girija from Mother side)
- Shailaja Acharya, former deputy PM of Nepal
- Mahesh Acharya ex. minister, Nephew of BP
- Amod Prasad Upadhyay, ex minister, nephew

== Nidhi ==
- Mahendra Narayan Nidhi, (Gandhian leader, a founding leader of Nepali congress, first deputy-speaker of First legislature Parliament, former Water Resource and Local Development)
- Bimalendra Nidhi, ex. deputy PM and Home minister of Nepal, vice-president of NC(Son of Mahendra Narayan Nidhi)
- Ninu Kumari Karn, Madhesh-based politician of Nepali Congress (Niece of Bimalendra Nidhi)

== Mishra ==
List ordered chronologically

- Bhadrakali Mishra, several ministerial portfolios, including Minister of Transport in joint Rana-Congress cabinet, 1951
- Ram Narayan Mishra, former Industry minister in B.P. Koirala cabinet, 1959
- Hari Shankar Mishra, Governor of Province no 2 since August 2021 (Son of Ram Narayan Mishra)

== Bhattarai ==
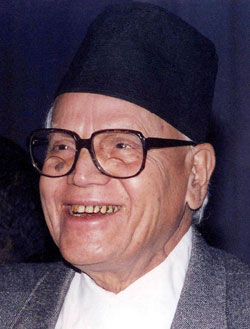
Krishna Prasad Bhattarai, Prime Minister and a key leader in establishing democracy in Nepal

Gajadhar Bhattarai was a courtier of the royal court during the reign of Prithvi Narayan Shah. He was later exiled to Varanasi, India by Jung Bahadur Rana for opposing the Rana regime. His son was Bishwanath Upadhyay. Bishwanath’s son, Sankata Bhattarai, was also an activist based in Varanasi, India during the Rana regime. Sankata’s son was Krishna Prasad Bhattarai, who served as Prime Minister of Nepal twice. The Bhattarai family played a role in the movement to end the Rana regime and establish democracy in Nepal.

Gajadhar Bhattarai (Courtier)
  - Biswanath Upadhyay
    - Sankata Bhattarai (Rana-era activist)
      - Krishna Prasad Bhattarai (Prime Minister)

== Bhandari ==
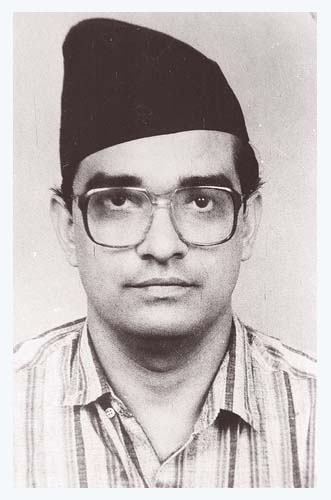
Madan Bhandari, former general secretary of CPN-UML

- Madan Bhandari, former CPN-UML general secretary
- Bidhya Devi Bhandari, first president of Nepal and wife of Madan Bhandari

== Bhattarai – Yami ==
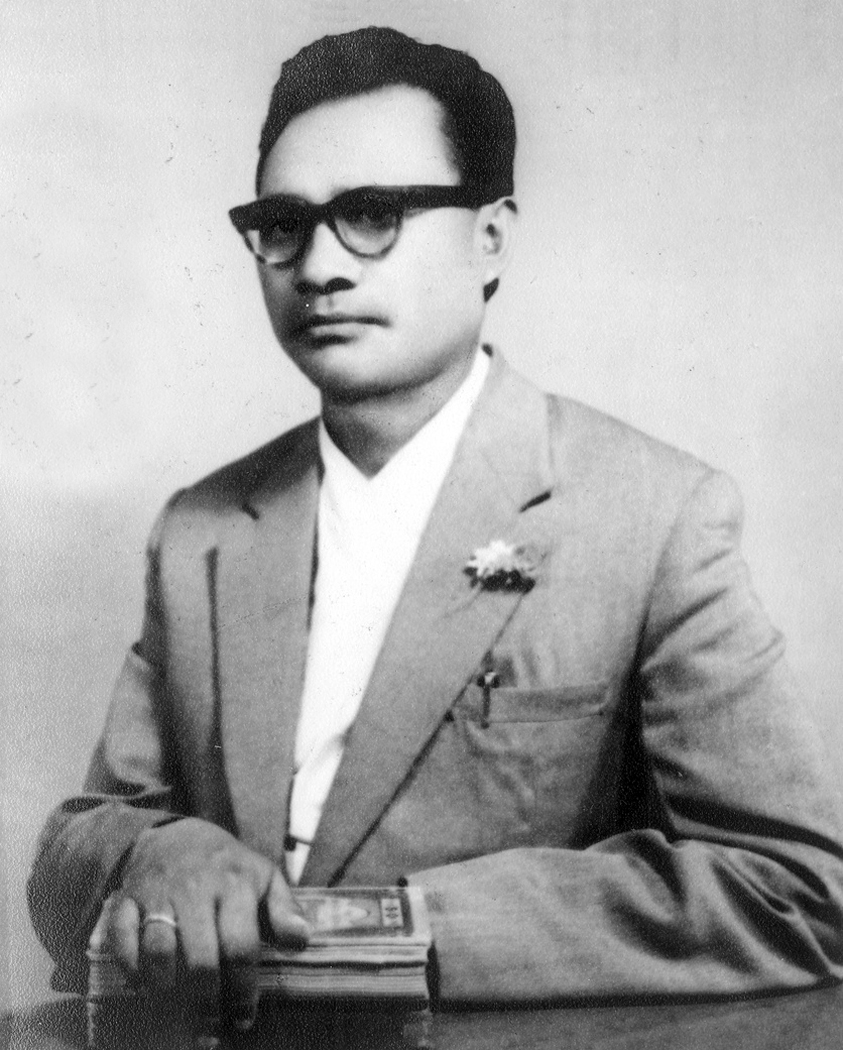
Dharma Ratna Yami, rana-era activist and writer

Dharma Ratna Yami was a Rana-era activist, a founding leader of Nepal Democratic Congress Party, and former Deputy Minister of forest. His daughter, Hisila Yami, is a social activist and former Minister of physical planning and works. She is married to Baburam Bhattarai, a founding leader of the Communist Party of Nepal, and former Prime Minister of Nepal. Their daughter, Manushi Yami Bhattarai, is a politician.

Dharma Ratna Yami (Minister and activist), father-in-law of Baburam Bhattarai
  - Baburam Bhattarai (Prime Minister)
  - Hisila Yami (Minister), daughter of Dharma Ratna Yami
    - Manushi Yami Bhattarai (Politician), daughter of Baburam Bhattarai

== Deuba – Rana ==
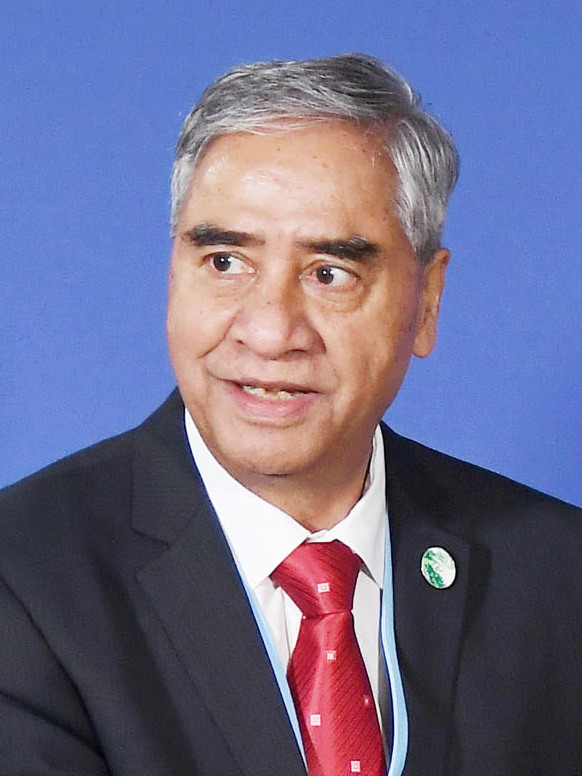
Sher Bahadur Deuba, former Prime Minister of Nepal

- Sher Bahadur Deuba Ex. Prime minister
- Arzu Rana Deuba Wife of Sher Bahadur Deuba
- Prakash Bahadur Deuba Ex.Minister for Physical Infrastructure of Sudur Paschim Province and nephew of Sher Bahadur Deuba

== KC – Thapa ==
- Arjun Narasingha K.C., Former Minister of Health, Education & Urban Development
  - Gagan Thapa, Current Member of Parliament, General Secretary of the Nepali Congress, and Former Minister of Health, son-in-law of Arjun Narasingha
  - Jagadiswor Narsingh KC, Former Member of the 1st and 2nd Constituent Assembly. Former President of Nepali Congress Nuwakot, younger brother of Arjun Narasingha
  - Ganesh Pandit, Former Member of Parliament (CPN-UML), Nuwakot-1 1991, uncle of Arjun Narasingha
  - Kedar Narasingha K.C., Former President of the Nepal Medical Council and Former Director of the National Tuberculosis Center.
  - Late Ramjee Kunwar, Senior Vice President of NTUCII and executive member of Nepali Congress Party. He was also the former vice president and secretary of NTUCI and was acting president.He was a candidate for mayor in local election of 2016.

== Mahat ==
- Dr. Ram Saran Mahat, Ex Finance Minister
- Prakash Sharan Mahat, Ex Foreign/Defence Minister, younger brother of Ram Saran

== Singh ==
- Ganesh Man Singh a founding leader Nepali Congress
  - Prakash Man Singh Ex deputy PM of Nepal

== Thapa (Kamal Thapa) ==
- Kamal Thapa ex minister, royalist
- Ganesh Thapa ex president of All Nepal Football Association (ANFA), Member of Constituent Assembly, brother of Kamal Thapa

== Thapa (Surya Bahadur Thapa) ==
- Surya Bahadur Thapa ex prime minister
  - Sunil Bahadur Thapa member of constituent assembly, son of Surya B.

== See also ==
- Political family
- List of political families
