= Basnyat family =

Nepali political dynasty

Basnyat dynasty बस्न्यात वंश/बस्न्यात काजी खलक Basnyats/Basnets of Gorkha
- Noble house
- Parent house: Shreepali Basnyat clan of Lamjung
- Country: Gorkha Kingdom; Kingdom of Nepal
- Founded: 18th century
- Founder: Shivaram Singh Basnyat
- Current head: currently as pretender
- Final ruler: Birdhwaj Basnyat (head of Basnyat clan on 1846)
- Titles: Hereditary Title of Kaji; Mulkaji of Kingdom of Nepal; Pradhan Senapati of the Nepalese Army; Shree 1 Maharaja of Khaptad
- Styles: Kaji Saheb; Basnyat Kaji
- Traditions: Tagadhari Chhetri
- Estates: Asan and Gorkha
- Deposition: 1846 Bhandarkhal massacre

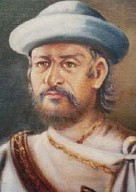
Kaji Abhiman Singh Basnet, a minister and military officer of Basnyat family

Basnyat/Basnet family or Basnyat/Basnet dynasty (Nepali: बस्न्यात वंश/बस्न्यात काजी खलक) was a Khas-Chhetri and a warlord clan family involved in the politics and administration of the Gorkha Kingdom and Kingdom of Nepal. This family got entry into Thar Ghar aristocracy group of Gorkha at the time of King Prithvi Narayan Shah. It was one of the four noble families to be involved in active politics of Nepal together with the Shah dynasty, Pande family and the Thapa dynasty before the rise of the Rana dynasty. This family is descended from Shivaram Singh Basnyat, the commander of Gorkhali forces and a member of Shreepali Basnyat clan of Gorkha. This family was maritally linked to Kala (Black) Pande section of the Pande dynasty through Chitravati Pande who married Kaji Kehar Singh Basnyat. This family was the last Kshatriya (Chhetri) political family to be wiped out from the central power by Jung Bahadur Rana of Kunwar family during the Bhandarkhal Massacre in 1846 for the conspiracy to take the power leading to people suffering from 104 long years of the Rana rule.

== Tharghar aristocracy ==
Basnyats/Basnet were part of Tharghar aristocratic group which assisted the rulers of the Kingdom of Gorkha and played significant roles in the Unification of Nepal. Basnets were not initially included in the Tharghar aristocracy group but got entry during the rule of King Prithvi Narayan Shah together with Thapas.

=== Senapati Badabir Shivaram Singh Basnyat ===
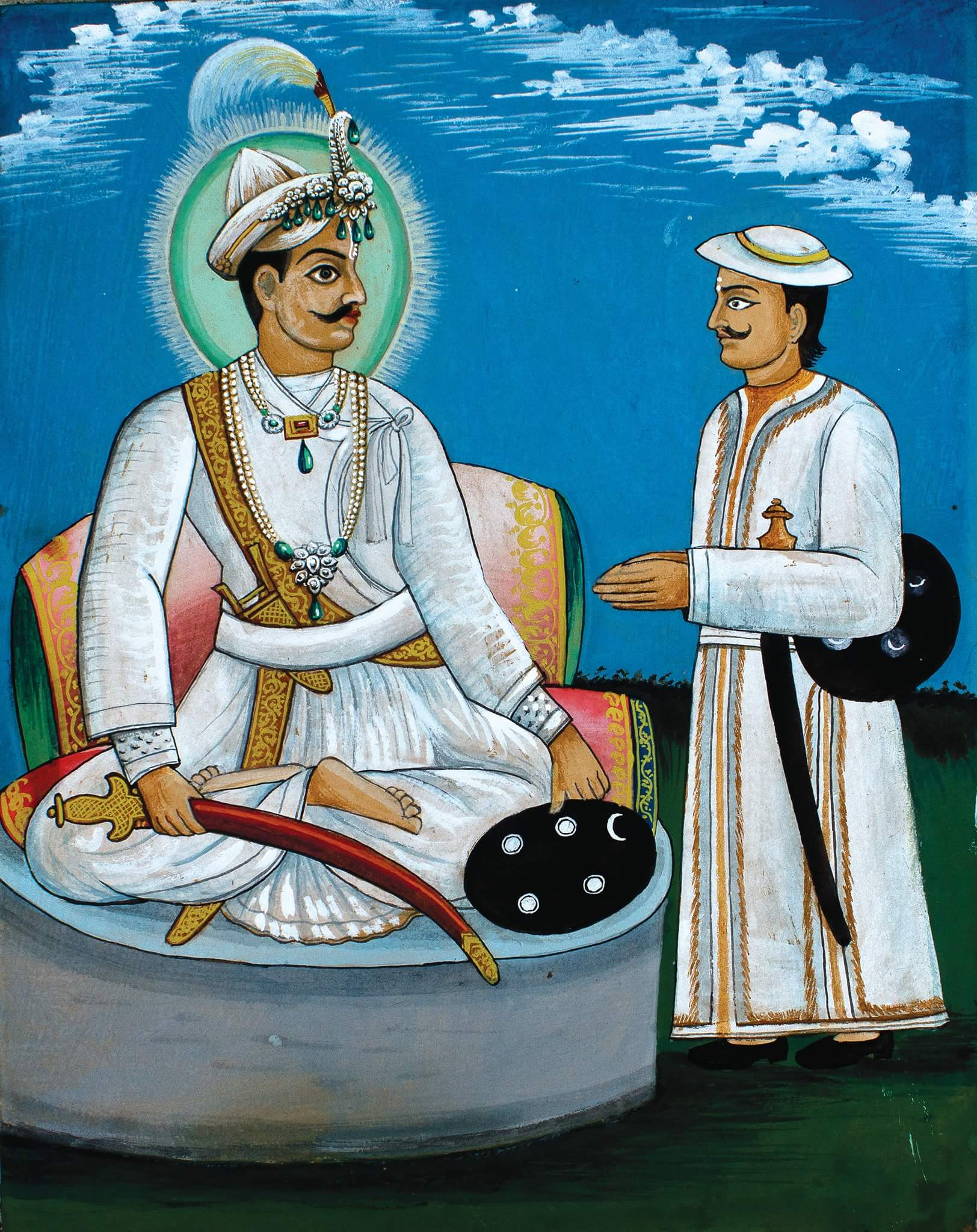
King Prithvi Narayan Shah consulting with his Senapati Shivaram Singh Basnyat, the patron of this family

Shivaram Singh Basnyat was the first military commander of King Prithvi Narayan Shah. He was the son of Jaya Ram Singh Basnyat of Gorkha. Shivaram died in the defensive battle of Sanga Chowk during Unification of Nepal on 1803 B.S. (1747 CE).

Prabal Singh, who lived in Lamjung, had two sons namely Jhapat Singh and Mohajaal Singh. These brothers Jhapat Singh and Mohajaal Singh were believed to have come to Gorkha from Lamjung with King Dravya Shah. Shreepali Basnyat among them Jhapat Singh and Mohajaal Singh, among other courtiers such as Narayan Arjyal and Ganesh Pandey, must have helped King Dravya Shah to secure the throne of Gorkha.

Shivaram Singh Basnyat was a descendant of Jhapat Singh. Shivaram Singh's grandfather was Bir Jadhau Singh. He may have been called ‘Bir’ because he might have shown his bravery during some battles. Shivaram Singh's father Jayaraj Singh was a respected Bhardar in Shah Royal Palace of Gorkha.

Shivaram Singh was the second son of Jayaraj Singh Basnyat and Draupadi Devi. His date of birth is not yet known. But when he was killed in 1803 BS, he was 32 years old. So it is estimated that he was born in 1771 BS. He had one elder brother Jaya Singh and two younger brothers namely Jagatmani Singh and Rana Singh. Shivaram Singh had four sons but his three brothers did not have any children. Shreepali Basnyat family was close to the Shah Royal family of Gorkha and the members of this family were working as courtiers of Gorkha Kingdom for a long time.

In 1803 BS, King Prithvi Narayan Shah called a meeting of trusted courtiers to discuss capturing another route to Tibet (Kuti) by which Kathmandu and other principalities like Bhaktapur and Lalitpur were engaged. It was decided that Sankhu, Changu, Naldum, and Mahadevpokhari needed to be captured. In view of blocking the trade routes, Gorkha wanted to besiege Kathmandu and other principalities and put them in an economic blockade. During that discussion, King wanted to know among the courtiers as to who was ready to lead the Gorkhali troops to conquer those areas. Nobody dared to speak up. There was complete silence for some minutes. Then, a 32-year old Shivaram Singh stood up and offered his services to the King and Gorkha.

Shivaram Singh crossed the Taadi river from Nuwakot and arrived at Patibhanjyang. Then he came to Sangachowk via high altitude of Jhule Lekh, Shivpuri, and to Changu, Sankhu, and Mahadevpokhari. He established a Tharpu (a temporary military camp) with his 900 soldiers in Sangachowk (presently Dware Tole), which is located at the place now called Jahar Singh Pauwa on the highway to Melamchi some 23 km north-east from Kathmandu.

Shivaram Singh was killed while fighting against the enemies on Monday, 5 Falgun 1803 B.S. (corresponding to 13 February 1747 A.D. Falgunsudi 4, Chaturthi). On that day, there was a sudden attack of combined forces of Kathmandu and Lalitpur consisting of about 3000 troops on the Gorkhali forces of 900 troops stationed at Sangachowk Tharpu just before midnight.

In this battle, Bhadgaon soldiers helped Kathmandu and Lalitpur forces by taking their side contrary to the understanding between two Kings i.e. King Prithvi Narayan Shah and King Ranajit Malla. King Prithvi Narayan Shah and Shivaram Singh trusted that a force from Bhaktapur led by Parshuram Thapa would come to his help and rescue. But it was a betrayal to Gorkha by the King of Bhaktapur Ranajit Malla and his Senapati Parshuram Thapa. It seemed that both King Ranajit Malla and Parshuram Thapa had already a tacit understanding on this matter prior to the battle. The combined force of Kathmandu and Lalitpur which was led by Kaji Taudhik Pradhan of Kathmandu attacked Gorkhalis. Thus, the Gorkhali soldiers could not sustain the massive sudden attack at midnight by a larger number of troops. According to Bakhat Man Singh Basnyat, while Shivaram Singh was fighting against Kathmandu troops in the front riding on a white horse, troops of Patan attacked from behind. It was later found that Shivaram Singh was holding his sword in his right hand while a strike of a sword by the enemy soldier of Patan from behind cut off his head. His head fell down. After that, his body fell some meters ahead in a position to attack the enemies.

The motive of Parshuram Thapa and King Ranajit Malla was to engage Gorkha in and around Naldum, Sankhu, Changu, and Mahadevpokhari areas, and incite Chaubisi and Baisi states to attack Gorkha from the western front such as from Lamjung, Kaski, Parbat, etc. After Shivaram Singh was killed in the battle, King Prithvi Narayan Shah was angry with both King Ranajit Malla and Parshuram Thapa.

Betrayal and big conspiracy against Gorkha by King Ranajit Malla and Parshuram Thapa were also evident from another incident mentioned in the Dibya Upadesh. Later, King Prithvi Narayan Shah found out that Parshuram Thapa had sent a letter with some money and material support to Chaubisi states and some of his men with his own brother to persuade them to fight against Gorkha.

=== Birangana (Heroine) Shoorprabha ===
Shivaram Singh was married to Sura Prabha, a sister of Bikram Thapa and an aunt of Birbhadra Thapa, the grandfather of Mukhtiyar Bhimsen Thapa of the Bagale Thapa clan. Therefore, Birbhadra came from Tanahun Kingdom to Gorkha Kingdom leaving all his ancestral property there due to his close family relations with Shivaram Singh. Shivaram Singh recruited his wife's nephew Birbhadra into the minor ranks of Jamadar in the army of the Gorkha Kingdom who later grew prominent and was considered among the influential Bharadars (courtiers) during annexation of Nuwakot in 1744.

When husband Shivaram Singh was martyred in the battle of Sangachowk, Shoorprabha was estimated to be about 28 years old. She asked for the audience of King Prithvi Narayan Shah. She took all three orphan sons along with her for meeting the King. Dhaukal Singh was not yet born. He was a "garbhe tuhuro" (that means when his father died he was still unborn or in the womb). She requested the King "since her husband- a Tiger died in the war, the four "cubs" should be taken care of by the State and they will be useful in the future battles. She also said that she herself was ready to go to battles if the state permitted." This touched the heart of King Prithvi Narayan Shah and he agreed to take care of all the children under the guidance of senior officials and got trained them in his palace. The four sons were Nahar Singh, Kehar Singh, Abhiman Singh and Dhaukal Singh.

On 14 Shrawan, 1812 BS, a big battle was fought between Gorkha and Lamjung in Siranchowk. Chaubisi states attacked Siranchowk of Gorkha out of jealousy because Gorkha was getting successful in capturing the eastern region like Naldum, Mahadevpokhhari, Sankhu, and Changu. Later it was found that King Ranajit Malla and his commander Parshuram Thapa were behind this game to incite the Chaubisi States.

According to historical accounts, Abhiman Singh was only 10 and a half years old at that time but he participated in that battle.52 Chautaria Mohaddamkirti Shah, Kaji Ranarudra Shah, a half-brother of King Prithvi Narayan Shah, and Kaji Kalu Pandey were leading the Gorkhali forces in this battle. According to one historical account, Nahar Singh and Kehar Singh also had participated in this battle. In the meantime, news came to the Gorkha Palace from the battlefront that Gorkhali forces were losing the war due to the shortage of food and water for the warriors. There were almost no male members in Gorkha at that time to send the re-enforcement with food and water. A group of courageous women led by the wife of Kaji Ranarudra Shah and Shoorprabha Basnyat with swords in them went to the battlefield in Siranchowk to distribute food and water to the fighters. According to Bhasha Vamsabali, this group of women went up to Chhoprak to distribute eleven sacks of bitten rice (chiura) and "khudo" or "shakhar" (molasis) to the fighters. We can see from this incident that to what extent Gorkhali women were patriotic in times of need. Shoorprabha sent her elder sons Nahar Singh, Kehar Singh and 10 1/2 years old son Abhiman Singh to the battle (Yogi Naraharinath (Ed.), Gorkhaliharuko Sainik Itihas, Yog Pracharini Kashi, 2011 BS p. 3.) and she herself went with sacks of food to help Gorkha forces so that it wins the battle. Thus Gorkha won the battle of Siranchok. This is why Shoorprabha was called Birangana (a Hero) in the history of modern Nepal because she was inspiring everybody for the unification of Nepal. Some historians believe that her name was only "Prabha" but "Shoor" (brave) was added later to her name because of her proven courage.

Former Vice-Chancellor of Tribhuvan University late Sardar Rudra Raj Pandey was a famous historical drama writer. He wrote a drama on Shoorprabha and her orphan sons, who met with King Prithvi Narayan Shah after Shivaram Singh was killed in the battle. Similarly, famous historian Yogi Naraharinath has compared Shoorprabha with other great mothers who inspired their sons thus: "Gorkhali brave men and women are very efficient in attacking enemies with Khukuris in their both hands. They do not know how to retreat and bow to others (enemy). This education is imparted by brave mothers to their sons in their own Gorkhali language like Pandavas got their lessons from their mother Kunti, Shivaji from his mother Jijabai, Prithvi Narayan from mother Chandraprabha and Nahar, Kehar, Abhiman and Dhaukal from their mother Shoorprabha. As such, the descendants of Gorkha will continue to get such lessons in their mothers’ language till Moon, Sun and Earth exist in the world."

Shoorprabha was also a religious-minded lady. She built a Narayan Temple in Timalkot Danda in Kavre at the top of a hill in memory of her husband and lit the lights at the midnight on the day before Janai Purnima. In continuation of this tradition, at present, there is an annual festival on Janai Purnima day at this Temple. About a thousand people gather every year around the Temple from the surrounding villages on this occasion. This Temple is believed to have been built in 1848 BS. (On Senapati Shivaram Singh Basnyat and Birangana Shoorprabha Basnyat, excerpts from the book "Role of Shreepali Basnyat in the Unification of Nepal" by Dr. Niranjan Man Singh Basnyat, published in July 2019, pp. 14–48 and pp. 48–51 respectively) Please refer to Dr. Basnyat's book for details.

King Prithvi Narayan Shah formed an alliance with the Basnyat dynasty and Pande dynasty of Gorkha in his quest for the unification of Nepal. As per his Divya Upadesh, King Prithvi Narayan is known to have arranged the marriage between Kaji Kehar Singh Basnyat, the second son of Senapati Badabir Shivaram Singh Basnyat, and Chitra Devi, the daughter of Kaji Kalu Pandey. Shivaram Singh Basnyat was addressed as Senapati Badabir (Brave Chief of the Army) in all the documents of that era. He died in the defensive battle of Sanga Chowk during Unification of Nepal on 1803 B.S.

Shivram Singh became the first major military leader of Gorkha who was martyred even before Kaji Kalu Pande in the campaign of unification of Nepal. Later, Birangana Shoorprabha Basnyat, widow of Shivram Singh, constructed the Narayan temple in Timal Danda (Kavre) in honour of her husband Senapati Badabir Shivram Singh. 'Birangana' Shoorprabha was a daughter of Bagale Thapa of Gorkha, who raised her four brave sons after the early martyrdom of her husband. The story of Shoor Prabha is written by former Vice-Chancellor late Rudra Raj Pandey in his epic "Hamro Gaurav" published in 2014 BS.

== Sons of Shivaram Singh ==
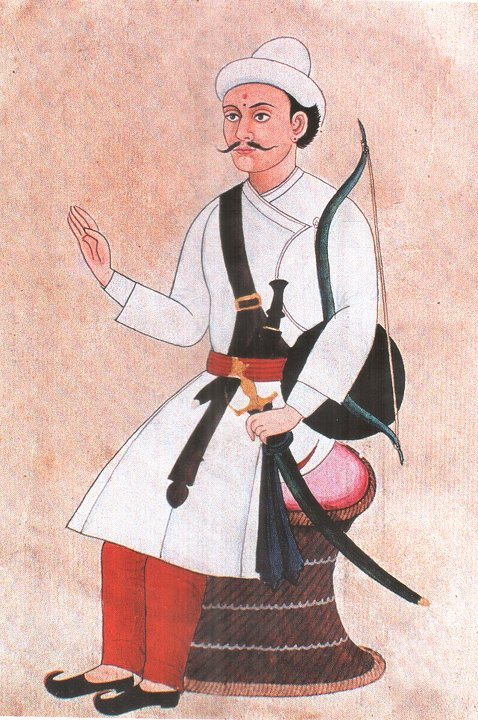
Kehar Singh Basnyat, a prominent Nepali General, a noble Shreepali Basnet

Kaji Naahar Singh Basnyat, first son of Shivram, fought in the battle of Makwanpur against the forces of Mir Kasim. He was a major military leader in the battle to capture Kantipur, Patan, and Bhadgaun in 1826 B.S. along with his three younger brothers. He also fought in the battle of Tibet in 1845 B.S.

Kaji Kehar Singh went to Tibet to negotiate with it to have the Nepali coins circulated in Tibet. He was the major military/civilian leader who united the western districts and Kathmandu valley to Nepal. He was instrumental in annexing Kathmandu, Patan, Bhaktapur, and Kirtipur. His contribution to unifying Nepal is incomparable. He was appointed Chief Administrator of Patan immediately after it was annexed to Nepal. King Prithvi Narayan Shah waged war against western Chaubise (24) Confederacy in 1770 under the military leadership of Kaji Vamsharaj Pande, Kaji Kehar Singh Basnyat and Sardar Prabhu Malla and achieved initial success. On 1771, the Gorkhali forces lost the war against Chaubise (24) principalities and Kaji Kehar Singh Basnyat died in the battlefield.

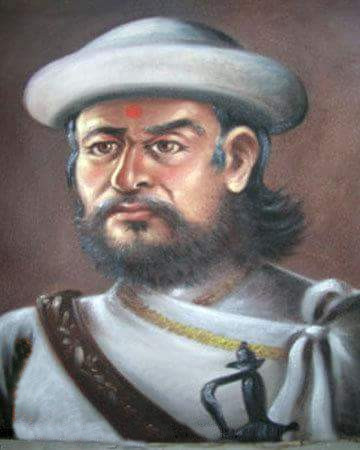
Kehar Singh Basnyat, Mulkaji of Nepal, a noble Shreepali Basnet

Abhiman Singh Basnyat, born on 14 Falgun 1801 B.S., the third son of Senapati Badabir Shivaram Singh Basnyat became the second Commander in Chief of a United Nepal. Abhiman's two elder brothers were Kaji Naahar Singh and Kaji Kehar Singh. His youngest brother Kaji Dhokal Singh Basnyat, who also became the governor of Kumaun Gadwal, was the first owner of the present Narayanhity Palace area known as Kirti Mandir at that time. Stone inscription about this is still there inside Narayanhity Palace compound. Abhiman Singh died at the age of fifty-six in Ashad 1857 B.S. when he was sent to settle the area of Morang and Sunsari, then called Kaala Banzaar. He had delivered the jamindari power to tharu and honored with the title of Chaudhari. It was a great injustice to him to have been assigned by King Rana Rahadur Shah to this area of dense forests at that old age when he was already a Mulkaji. It was because of Abhiman's displeasure about the marriage of Rana Bahadur with the child Brahmin widow Kantivati. He was reported to have suffered from fever, possibly Malaria, and died of it. Despite the Basnyat family's immense contribution to Nepal's Unification, nobody from the Basnyat family was declared Rastriya Bibhuti (National Hero). We cannot undermine the sacrifice made by the brave Basnyat family of six members at that time namely Shivram, Shoor Prabha, Naahar, Kehar, Abhiman and Dhaukal in the unification campaign of King Prithvi Narayan Shah. There were other Basnyats of Shreepali origin such as Ranya (Bangya) Basnyat, Jitman, Bir Dhwaj Basnyat, Indra Bir, Banka Bir, Ranadip Singh, Rana Dhir Singh, Jahar Singh, Kirti Man Singh, Bakhtabar Singh, Bakhat Singh, Kul Man Singh, Prasad Singh, etc. who fought or sacrificed their lives in various battles and wars for the protection of Nepal's sovereignty in the later periods of Nepalese history. Researchers are suggested to read the book jointly written by late Lt. Col. Hanuman Singh Basnyat and late Purna Man Singh Basnyat entitled "Shreepali Basnyat-Parichaya, Published in 2058 BS for details.

King Prithvi Narayan Shah has stressed the importance of the Basnyats in his historic piece known as "Dibya Upadesh" or "Divine Counsel" in English. Here is a link to the translation of the "Dibya Upadesh" into English. This translation was done by Prawin Adhikari, from a transcription originally published by historian Baburam Acharya from Bakhat man Singh Basnyat. Samudaya.org owns the copyrights to the article.

A quote from the Dibya Upadesh:

It said—"Now, I will make ties between the Pandes and the Basnyats, so give your daughter to Sivaram Basnyat's son Kehar Singh Basnyat," and the two houses were tied by marriage. Thus, after the conjugal tie, with the shields of the Pandes and the swords of the Basnyats, I attacked Nepal.

After the royal palace moved from Gorkha to Basantapur in Kathmandu, the Shreepali Basnyats of Gorkha moved along with the royal family, living close by the palace in Indra Chowk and Ason. Kaji Abhiman Singh constructed a house in 1833 B.S. for himself in Ason, Kathmandu, which is known as Maan Mandir, which still exists as Tilanga Ghar or Paltan Ghar. This Tilanga Ghar should be declared the National Heritage of Nepal and needs to be renovated. Basnyats shared a great amount of power in the court alongside the Pandeys and Thapas. This continued until the reign of King Rana Bahadur Shah, when Prime Minister Bhimsen Thapa came into power and there was a power struggle between the Pandeys and the Thapas. The Basnyats sided with the Pandeys as they had earlier marital links with them back in Gorkha.

== Kirtiman Singh and Bakhtawar Singh ==
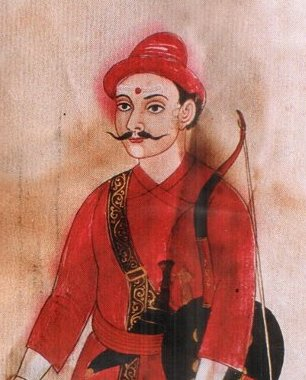
Kirtiman Singh Basnyat, Mulkaji of Nepal (1794–1801), dynast of Basnyat family

Kirtiman Singh, Bakhtawar Singh and Jahar Singh were the sons of Kehar Singh Basnyat. Two of them became Mulkaji of Nepal after their uncle Abhiman Singh Basnyat. Jahar Singh became Kaji only in the annual Pajani (renewal) of 1825. Abhiman's sons - Ranabir Singh and Ranadip Singh served mostly as a Sardar until in 1839, Ranadip being promoted to Kaji. Dhokal Singh's son Ranadhir Singh became Kaji three times in the years 1819, 1829, and 1830.

In 1794, King Rana Bahadur Shah came of age, and his first act was to re-constitute the government such that his uncle, Chief Chautaria Bahadur Shah of Nepal, had no official part to play. After removal of Bahadur Shah of Nepal, Kirtiman Singh Basnyat was appointed as Chief (Mul) Kaji among the four Kajis though Damodar Pande was the most influential Kaji. Kirtiman had succeeded Abhiman Singh Basnyat as Chief Kaji. He was also a favorite of the Regent Subarna Prabha Devi. He was secretly assassinated on 28 September 1801, by the supporters of Raj Rajeshwari Devi. Another Kaji Damodar Pande was accused of the murder charges. In the resulting confusion many courtiers were jailed, while some executed, based solely on rumors. Bakhtawar Singh Basnyat, brother of assassinated Kirtiman Singh, was then given the post of Mulkaji. During his tenure as the Mulkaji, on 28 October 1801, a Treaty of Commerce and Alliance (Note: The treaty was signed by Gajraj Misra, on the behalf of Nepal Durbar, and Charles Crawford, on the behalf of East India Company, in Danapur, India. Among the articles in the treaty, it decided on perpetual peace and friendship between the two states, on the pension for Rana Bahadur Shah, the establishment of a British Residency in Kathmandu, and an establishment of trade relations between the two states.) was finally signed between Nepal and East India Company. This led to the establishment of the first British Resident, Captain William O. Knox, who was reluctantly welcomed by the courtiers in Kathmandu on 16 April 1802. (Note: Knox had previously accompanied Captain William Kirkpatrick in the 1792 British diplomatic mission to Nepal as a Lieutenant in charge of the military escort. In Knox's 1801 mission, he was accompanied by experts like the naturalist Francis Buchanan-Hamilton, who later published An Account of the Kingdom of Nepal in 1819, and the surveyor Charles Crawford, who made the first scientific maps of Kathmandu valley and of Nepal, and proposed that the Himalayas might be among the highest mountains in the world.) The primary objective of Knox's mission was to bring the trade treaty of 1792 into full effect and to establish a "controlling influence" in Nepali politics. Almost eight months after the establishment of the Residency, Rajrajeshwari finally managed to assume the regency on 17 December 1802. Rajrajeshowri's presence in Kathmandu also stirred unrest among the courtiers that aligned themselves around her and Subarnaprabha. Sensing an imminent hostility, Knox aligned himself with Subarnaprabha and attempted to interfere with the internal politics of Nepal. Getting a wind of this matter, Rajrajeshowri dissolved the government and elected new ministers, with Damodar Pande as the Chief (Mul) Kaji in February 1803, while the Resident Knox, finding himself persona non grata and the objectives of his mission frustrated, voluntarily left Kathmandu to reside in Makwanpur citing a cholera epidemic.

== Fourth generation of Basnyats ==
The sons of Bakhtawar Singh Basnyat were the most prominent among their cousins. Kulaman Singh and Prasad Singh, two sons of Bakhtawar Singh, were regular Bharadar (state-bearing officer) between 1825 and 1839. Kulaman Singh Basnyat was the only consistent Kaji from the Basnyat family between 1824 and 1839 while his brother Prasad Singh was Sardar from 1825 to 1838 before being promoted to Kaji in 1839. Their less prominent brother Buddhiman Singh was a Sardar in 1825 and Kaji in 1838. Jitman Singh, a son of Kirtiman Singh Basnyat, was a Kaji in the two tenures of 1818-1819 and 1834–1837. Bakhan Singh, the son of Jahar Singh, was a Sardar and later Colonel for various tenure between 1816 and 1838.

== Basnyat family members ==
No.	Members	Image	Position	Years in the position	Notes
1	Shivaram Singh Basnyat		Senapati of Gorkha Kingdom	up to 1747 A.D.	
2	Kehar Singh Basnyat		Kaji and commander	up to 1771 A.D.	second son of Shivaram Singh
3	Abhiman Singh Basnyat		Mulkaji (Prime Minister) and Commander-in-Chief	1785–1794 A.D.	third son of Shivaram and head of Basnyats between 1785 and 1794
4	Kirtiman Singh Basnyat		Mulkaji (Prime Minister) and Commander-in-Chief	1794–1801 A.D.	son of Kehar Singh, succeeded his uncle Abhiman Singh during his lifetime
5	Bakhtawar Singh Basnyat		Mulkaji (Prime Minister)	1801–1803 A.D.	

=== Other members ===
No.	Members	Image	Position	Years in the position	Notes
1	Naahar Singh Basnyat		Military commander		first son of Shivaram Singh
2	Dhokal Singh Basnyat		Bada Hakim of Kumaon and Garhwal		fourth and youngest son of Shivaram Singh
3	Kulaman Singh Basnyat		Kaji (minister)	1824–1839 A.D.	son of Bakhtawar Singh and most significant Basnyat courtier of fourth generation
4	Prasad Singh Basnyat		Sardar and later Kaji (minister)	1825–1838 A.D. (Sardar); 1839 onwards (Kaji)	son of Bakhtawar Singh
5	Birdhwaj Basnyat		Kaji (minister)	up to 1846 A.D.	chief conspirator against Jung Bahadur Rana who fell at Bhandarkhal Parva (massacre)

|- |6||Anil Basnet||,

== Gallery ==
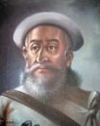
Shivaram Singh Basnyat

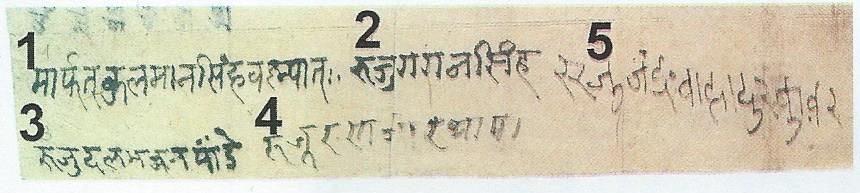
Kulaman Singh Basnyat's signature as Kaji (minister)
