= Kehar Singh Basnyat =

Nepalese Kazi and Warlord

Kaji Kehar Singh Basnyat
- काजी केहरसिंह बस्न्यात
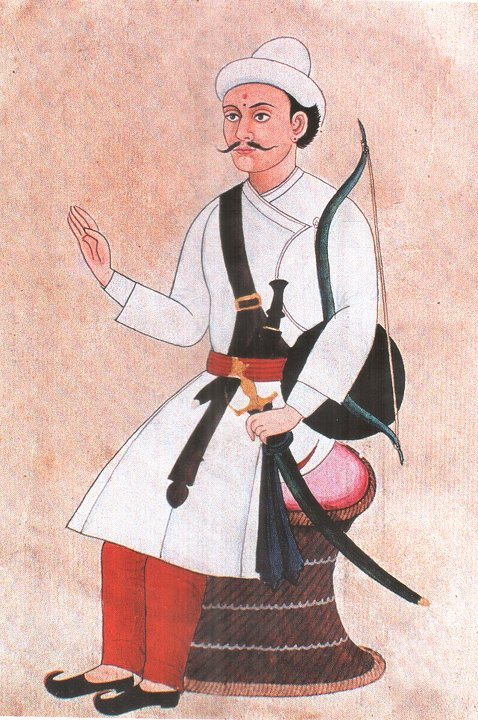
- Kehar Singh Basnyat

Kaji (Nepal)
- In office TBD–TBD
- Preceded by: TBD
- Succeeded by: TBD

Personal details
- Children: Kirtiman Singh Basnyat; Bakhtawar Singh Basnyat; Jahar Singh Basnyat
- Parents: Shivaram Singh Basnyat (father); Shuraprabha Thapa (mother)
- Relatives: Kalu Pande (father-in-law); Bamsa Raj Pande (brother-in-law); Damodar Pande (brother-in-law)

Military service
- Allegiance: Nepal
- Rank: Kazi
- Battles/wars: Unification of Nepal

Kehar Singh Basnyat (Nepali: केहरसिंह बस्न्यात) or Kehar Singh Basnet was a Nepalese military commander and war hero who laid down his life in the Unification battles of Nepal. He was born in the illustrious clan of Shreepali Basnyats as a member of Kshettriya (warrior) class.

== Family ==
He was born as second son of General Senapati Badabir Shivaram Singh Basnyat. He had three brothers: Naahar Singh Basnyat, Abhiman Singh Basnyat, and Dhokal Singh Basnyat. He had three sons: Kirtiman Singh Basnyat, Bakhtawar Singh Basnyat, and Jahar Singh Basnyat. King Prithvi Narayan Shah formed an alliance with Basnyat family and Pande family of Gorkha in his quest for the unification of Nepal. As per his Divya Upadesh, King Prithvi Narayan is known to have arranged the marriage between Kaji Kehar Singh and Chitra Devi, the daughter of Kaji of Gorkha Kalu Pande. His father Shivaram Singh was addressed as Senapati Badabir (Brave Chief of the Army) in all the documents of that era. He died in the defensive battle of Sanga Chowk during Unification of Nepal on 1803 B.S.

== Career ==
He actively took part in Unification battles of Nepal. He, along with Kaji Vamsharaj Pande, Mahoddam Kirti Shah, Surpratap Shah, Dal Mardan Shah, Rana Rudra Shah, Nandu Shah, Kaji Naahar Singh Basnyat and Kaji Abhiman Singh Basnyat, was dispatched with approximately 1,100 fighting troops to encircle the Makawanpur fortress by the dawn of 20 August 1762. After consolidation of Kathmandu valley states, King Prithvi Narayan Shah waged war against western Chaubise (24) Confederacy on 1770 A.D., under military leadership of Kaji Bamsharaj Pande, Kaji Kehar Singh Basnyat, and Sardar Prabhu Malla, to initial success. In 1771 A.D., the Gorkhali forces lost the war against 24 Chaubise principalities and Kaji Bamsharaj was captured by soldiers of Parbat Kingdom as a war prisoner. Kaji Kehar Singh died in the battlefield at Satahun. His brother Dhaukal Singh Basnyat and another military officer Sriharsh Pantha narrowly escaped after the tough confrontation at Dhor.

== Books ==
- Acharya, Baburam; Naraharinath, Yogi (2014). Badamaharaj Prithivi Narayan Shah ko Divya Upadesh (2014 Reprint ed.). Kathmandu: Shree Krishna Acharya. ISBN 978-99933-912-1-0.
- Hamal, Lakshman B. (1995). Military history of Nepal. Sharda Pustak Mandir. p. 125. OCLC 32779233.
- Mainali, Pramod (2006), Milestones of history, vol. 2, Pramod Mainali, ISBN 9789994696048
- Regmi, D.R. (1975), Modern Nepal, vol. 1, Firma K.L. Mukhopadhyay, ISBN 0883864916
- Regmi, Mahesh Chandra (1995), Kings and political leaders of the Gorkhali Empire, 1768–1814, Orient Longman, p. 83, ISBN 9788125005117
- Shaha, Rishikesh (1990), Modern Nepal 1769–1885, Riverdale Company, ISBN 0-913215-64-3
- Shaha, Rishikesh (2001), An Introduction of Nepal, Kathmandu: Ratna Pustak Bhandar
- Pradhan, Kumar L. (2012), Thapa Politics in Nepal: With Special Reference to Bhim Sen Thapa, 1806–1839, New Delhi: Concept Publishing Company, p. 278, ISBN 9788180698132
- Vaidya, Tulsi Ram (1993), Prithvinaryan Shah, the founder of Nepal, Anmol Publications, ISBN 9788170417019
