= Basnet (disambiguation) =

Basnet may refer to:

== Surnames, clan and peoples ==
- Basnet, Nepalese surname
- Basnyat family, Nepalese family
- List of people with surname Basnet
- Shreepali Basnyat, clan of Basnyat

== Location ==
- Basnettville, West Virginia
