= Shreepali =

Shreepali Basnyat
- श्रीपाली बस्न्यात
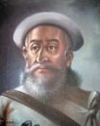
- Senapati Shivaram Singh Basnyat, influential member of Shreepali Basnyat
- Jāti: Chhetri
- Gotra: Bhardwaj Gotra
- Kuladevta (male): Masto and Shishakoti Mahadev, Veerabhadra
- Kuladevi (female): Mahakali
- Religions: Hindu
- Languages: Nepali, Dotyali, Kumaoni
- Country: Nepal
- Original state: Khasa Kingdom
- Family names: Basnet, Basnyat
- Heraldic title: Basnyat Kaji
- Lineage: Suryavansha
- Notable members: Shivaram Singh Basnyat; Kehar Singh Basnyat; Abhiman Singh Basnyat; Kirtiman Singh Basnyat; Bakhtawar Singh Basnyat
- Historical grouping: Khasas
- Disputed grouping: Shrimali/Bhinmali Rajputs

The Shreepali Basnet are a clan of the Chhetris originally from the Saipal, Far West Region who got their prominence in Gorkha district of Nepal. They mainly worship 'Masto' as their 'Kulayan' but saipali from Gorkha has changed their worship to "Sishakoti Mahadev", "Veerabhadra", "Mahakali" as their Kul Deuta and Aradhe Devi "Dakshinkali" as Istha deuta in style of Kunwar Rana. They became very powerful during the unification of Nepal and remained so until the emergence of Jung Bahadur Kunwar or later known as Jang Bahadur Rana.

== The King's men ==
In the reign of King Prithivi Narayan Shah the Shreepali Basnyats of Gorkha were the leading military force. They were either highly ranked officers in the army or key figures in the king's court. King Prithvi Narayan Shah formed an alliance between the Basnyat and Pandey families of Gorkha in his quest for the unification of Nepal. Shivaram Singh Basnyat, the commander of Gorkhali forces belonged to Shreepali Basnyat clan. He was son of Jaya Ram Singh Basnyat.
