= Ninu Kumari Karn =

Nepalese politician (born 1973)

- निनु कुमारी कर्ण

Member of the House of Representatives
- Incumbent
- Assumed office TBD
- Constituency: Party List (Nepali Congress)

Personal details
- Born: 19 October 1973 (age 52) Mahnaur,Siraha
- Citizenship: Nepali
- Party: Nepali Congress
- Relations: Nidhi family
- Parent(s): Chandradev Lal Kaushik, Janaki Devi
- Relatives: Mahendra Narayan Nidhi (Maternal Grandfather); Bimalendra Nidhi (Maternal Uncle)

Ninu Kumari Karna (Maithili/Nepali/Devanagari: निनु कुमारी कर्ण) is a Nepali politician. She is a member of the Madhesh Province Provincial Committee of Nepali Congress.

Coming from a family of high political background, she was a teacher at the Budhanilkantha School, Kathmandu before joining politics. Being a teacher working in the 'Temporary' quota, she was the General Secretary of the Nepal Temporary Teachers Association formed to agitate against the decision of the then Nepal Government to lay off all the temporary teachers. She resigned from her job to join politics in 2018.

== Political career ==
Ninu had been politically active since childhood. She was one of the student protesters against the Panchayati regime in Nepal in the 1990s. Ninu worked on the ground for the rights of Madheshi people and women. She also writes articles which are published in various national dailies. She has been considered close to her maternal uncle, Bimalendra Nidhi and she has been aiding Nidhi in his campaigns. She was picked as a candidate from Nepali Congress from the Party List in the 2022 Nepalese general election in the Madhesi people category. Initially ranked at 2nd in the Madhesi women category, she was pushed down to 5th rank in the list for unknown reasons.

After the final results of the 2022 Nepalese general election were announced, Nepali Congress was allotted 32 seats from the Proportional Representation Category. The list publicized first included Ninu's name in that, which was later cut off, the reasons being unknown.

Ninu was elected to the House of Representatives from the party list of Nepali Congress in the 2026 Nepalese general election.
