= Sarbajit Rana Magar =

Top administrator in Nepal

Sri Kaji Kaji Sarbajit Rana Magar
- श्री काजी सर्वजीत राना मगर
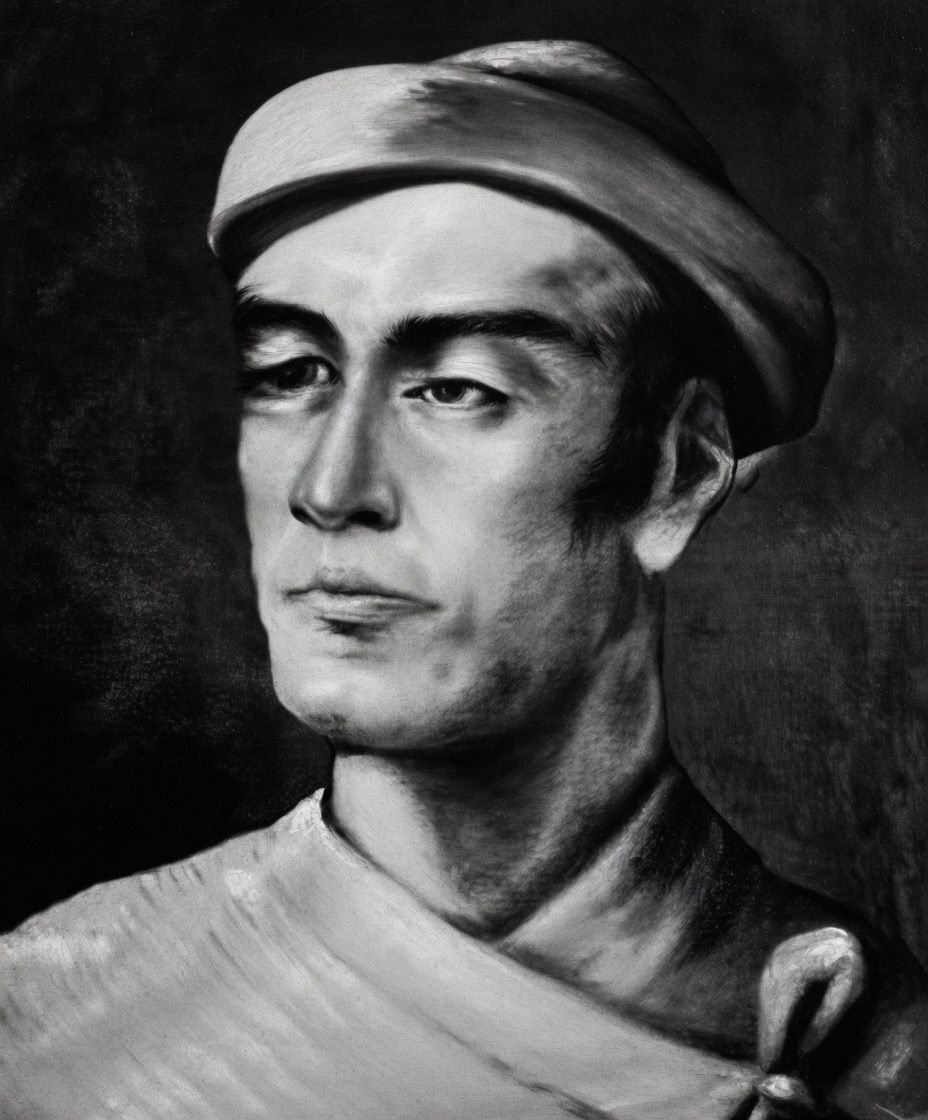

Kaji
- In office 1777-1778
- Preceded by: Swarup Singh Karki
- Succeeded by: Vamsharaj Pande

Personal details
- Born: c. 1750 Gulmi, Nepal
- Died: March 10, 1778 (aged 27) A.D. (before Bhadra 1835 B.S.) Kathmandu, Nepal
- Relatives: Kaji Bandhu Rana Magar (brother)

Military service
- Rank: Kaji

Kaji Sarbajit Rana Magar (Nepali: सर्वजीत राना मगर) or simply Sarbajit Rana was a Nepalese politician, minister and courtier in the Kingdom of Nepal. He became a prominent minister during the regency of Queen Rajendra Laxmi and was a significant personality in central politics in the Kingdom of Nepal. He was assassinated by opponents of Rajendra Laxmi on the charges of having illicit relationship with the Queen.

== Personal life ==
Sarbajit belonged to Gulmi in Western Nepal, which was a parental home of the Queen Rajendra Laxmi. He belonged to Magar ethnicity. He had a brother who was also a Kaji during the regency of Queen Rajendra Laxmi. Sarbajit was considered to be the Regent Queen's right-hand man.

== Court Politics ==
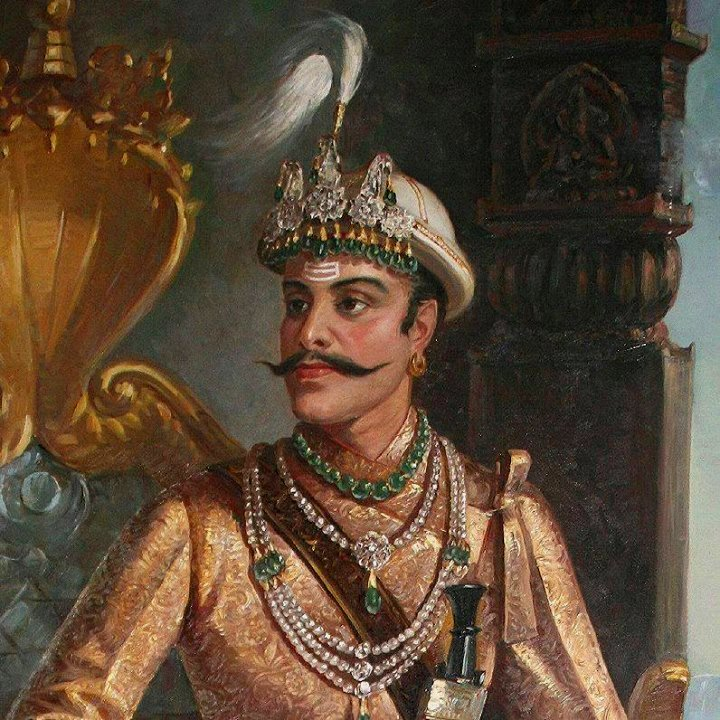
Rana Bahadur Shah (1777-1799), King of Nepal, Kaji Sarbajit Rana Magar was made a Kaji in his kingship

King Pratap Singh Shah died on 22 November 1777 A.D. leaving his infant son Rana Bahadur Shah as the King of Nepal. Sarbajit was made a Kaji along with Balbhadra Shah and Vamsharaj Pande while Daljit Shah was chosen as Chief Chautariya. Historian Dilli Raman Regmi asserts that Sarbajit was chosen as Chief Kazi (equivalent to Prime Minister of Nepal). Historian Rishikesh Shah asserts that Sarbajit was the head of the Nepalese government for a short period in 1778. Afterwards, rivalry arose between Prince Bahadur Shah of Nepal and Queen Rajendra Laxmi. In the rivalry, Sarbajit led the followers of the Queen opposed to Sriharsh Pant who led the followers of Bahadur Shah. The group of Bharadars (officers) led by Sarbajit poisoned the ears of Rajendra Laxmi against Bahadur Shah. Rajendra Laxmi succeeded in the confinement of Prince Bahadur Shah with the help of her new minister Sarbajit. Guru Gajraj Mishra came to rescue Bahadur Shah on the condition that Bahadur Shah should leave the country. Also, his rival Sriharsh Pant was branded outcast and expelled instead of execution which was prohibited for Brahmins.

Prince Bahadur confined his sister-in-law Queen Rajendra Laxmi on the charge of having illicit relation with Sarbajit on 31 August 1778. Subsequently, Sarbajit was executed inside the palace by Prince Bahadur Shah with the help of male servants of the royal palace. Historian Bhadra Ratna Bajracharya asserts that it was actually Chautariya Daljit Shah who led the opposing group against Sarbajit Rana and Rajendra Laxmi. The letter dated B.S. 1835 Bhadra Sudi 11 Roj 4 (1778 A.D.) to Narayan Malla and Vrajabasi Pande asserts the death of Sarbajit under misconduct and the appointment of Bahadur Shah as regent. The death of Sarbajit Rana Magar is considered to have marked the initiation of court conspiracies and massacres in the newly unified Kingdom of Nepal. Historian Baburam Acharya points that the sanctions against Queen Rajendra Laxmi under moral misconduct was a mistake of Bahadur Shah. Similarly, the murder of Sarbajit was condemned by many historians as an act of injustice.
