= Subarna Prabha Devi =

Queen Subarna Prabha
- Queen Mother and Regent of Nepal
- Born: c. 1779
- Died: 1806 (aged 26–27)
- Spouse: Rana Bahadur Shah
- Issue: Ranodyat Bikram Shah; Samarsher Shah a princess
Names
- Subarna Prabha Devi
- Dynasty: House of Shah (by marriage); Basnet (by birth)
- Father: Subudhi Khadka Basnyat
- Religion: Hinduism

Subarna Prabha Devi (c. 1779–1806) (Nepali: सुवर्णप्रभा देवी) was the Queen Regent of Nepal between 1802 and 1806 during the minority of Girvan Yuddha Bikram Shah.

== Biography ==
She was the second wife of King Rana Bahadur Shah of Nepal. She was the mother of eldest Prince Ranodyat Bikram Shah, Prince Samarsher Shah and a princess. She was daughter of Subudhi Khadka Basnyat.

In 1799, her consort abdicated to become a sanyasi in favor of his son Girvan, the first wife Raj Rajeshwari Devi was immediate regent. As King Rana Bahadur Shah, Regent Raj Rajeshwari Devi and his advisor, Bhimsen Thapa left for Varanasi, she stayed back in Kathmandu to serve as the regent. Meanwhile, Raj Rajeshwari Devi, the first wife entered the border of Nepal on 26 July 1801, and taking advantage of the weak regency of Subarna Prabha, was slowly making her way towards Kathmandu with the view of taking over the regency.

As a result, Subarnaprabha's favorite courtier Mul Kaji (Chief minister) Kirtiman Singh Basnyat was secretly assassinated on 28 September 1801, by the supporters of Rajrajeswori. On 28 October 1801, a Treaty of Commerce and Alliance was finally signed between Nepal and East India Company. This led to the establishment of the first British Resident, Captain William O. Knox, who was reluctantly welcomed by the courtiers in Kathmandu on 16 April 1802.

=== Regent ===
Almost eight months after the establishment of the Residency, Queen Rajrajeshwari finally managed to assume the regency on 17 December 1802 throwing Subarna Prabha out of power.

Rajrajeshowri's presence in Kathmandu also stirred unrest among the courtiers that aligned themselves around her and Subarnaprabha. Sensing an imminent hostility, Resident Knox aligned himself with Subarnaprabha. When Resident Knox found himself persona non grata and the objectives of his mission frustrated, he voluntarily left Kathmandu to reside in Makwanpur citing a cholera epidemic. That caused Subarnaprabha and the members of her faction were arrested. After Rana Bahadur Shah's reinstatement to power, Subarnaprabha and her supporters were released and given a general pardon.

On the night of 25 April 1806 at around 10 pm, Sher Bahadur Shah killed Rana Bahadur Shah. Taking advantage of the political chaos, Bhimsen became the mukhtiyar (1806–37), and Tripurasundari was given the title Lalita Tripurasundari and declared regent and Queen Mother (1806–32) of Girvan Yuddha Shah, who was himself 9 years old.

All the other wives and concubines of Rana Bahadur, along with their handmaidens, were forced to commit sati barring Subarna Prabha.
