= Kirtiman Singh Basnyat =

Top administrator in Nepal

Sri Mulkazi Saheb Kirtiman Singh Basnyat
- श्री मूलकाजी साहेब कीर्तिमान सिंह बस्न्यात
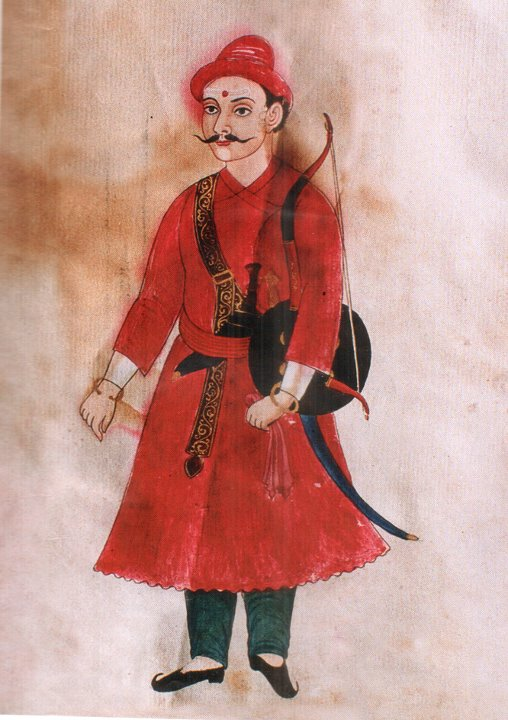

Mul (Chief) Kaji of Nepal
- In office 1794 – 28 September 1801
- Preceded by: Abhiman Singh Basnyat
- Succeeded by: Bakhtawar Singh Basnyat

Personal details
- Born: c. 1760
- Died: September 28, 1801 (aged 41) Basantapur, Kathmandu
- Parents: Kehar Singh Basnyat (father); Chitra Devi Pande (mother)
- Relatives: Shivaram Singh Basnyat (grandfather); Kalu Pande (maternal grandfather); Abhiman Singh Basnyat (uncle); Bamsa Raj Pande(maternal uncle); Damodar Pande(maternal uncle); Bakhtawar Singh Basnyat (brother)

Military service
- Allegiance: Nepal
- Rank: General
- Battles/wars: Sino-Nepalese War (I & II)

Kirtiman Singh Basnyat (Nepali: कीर्तिमान् सिंह बस्न्यात) was Mul Kaji (Chief Minister) of the Royal Court of Nepal from 1794 to his death on 28 September 1801. He was a military commander of the Nepalese Army.

== Military career ==
He fought in the Sino-Nepalese War and various other campaigns. In his first Battle, he fought from the Kerung Axis under the leadership of Kaji Balbhadra Shah along with Amar Singh Thapa (Sardar), Bhotu Pande and in the second battle from the Kharta Axis.

== Court Politics ==
In 1794, King Rana Bahadur Shah came of age, and his first act was to re-constitute the government such that his uncle, Chief Chautaria Bahadur Shah of Nepal, had no official part to play. After removal of Bahadur Shah of Nepal, he was appointed as Chief (Mul) Kaji among the four Kajis though Damodar Pande was the most influential Kaji. Kirtiman had succeeded Abhiman Singh Basnyat as Chief Kaji. He was also a favorite of the Regent Subarna Prabha Devi. He was secretly assassinated on 28 September 1801, by the supporters of Raj Rajeshwari Devi. (Note: Historian Rishikesh Shah (1990) also supports that Kirtiman Singh was killed on the year 1801 A.D. and was succeeded by his brother Bakhtabar Singh Basnyat.) Another Kazi Damodar Pande was accused of the murder charges. In the resulting confusion many courtiers were jailed, while some executed, based solely on rumors. Bakhtawar Singh Basnyat, brother of assassinated Kirtiman Singh, was then given the post of MulKaji.
