= Bakhtawar Singh Basnyat =

Top administrator in Nepal

Shree Mulkaji Saheb Bakhtawar Singh Basnyat
- श्री मूलकाजी साहेब बख्तावर सिँह बस्न्यात

Mulkazi (Chief Kazi) of Nepal

Mulkaji
- In office 1801 A.D. – February, 1803 A.D.
- Preceded by: Kirtiman Singh Basnyat
- Succeeded by: Damodar Pande

Personal details
- Born: c. 1759
- Died: July 15, 1840 (aged 81)
- Parents: Kehar Singh Basnyat (father); Chitra Devi Pandey (mother)
- Relatives: Uncles Abhiman Singh Basnyat, Bamsa Raj Pandey, Damodar Pande,

Military service
- Allegiance: Nepal
- Rank: General

Bakhtawar Singh Basnyat (Nepali: बख्तावर सिँह बस्न्यात) was Mulkazi (Chief Kazi) of Nepal.

Mulkazi Kirtiman Singh Basnyat who was backed by Queen Regent Subarna Prabha Devi, was secretly assassinated on 28 September 1801, by the supporters of Raj Rajeshwari Devi. Damodar Pande was also blamed for the murder. During the investigation, many were punished without any evidence and he was given the position and title held by his brother Kirtiman Singh for a brief period.

During his tenure as the mul kaji, on 28 October 1801, a Treaty of Commerce and Alliance (Note: The treaty was signed by Gajraj Misra, on the behalf of Nepal Durbar, and Charles Crawford, on the behalf of East India Company, in Danapur, India. Among the articles in the treaty, it decided on perpetual peace and friendship between the two states, on the pension for Rana Bahadur Shah, the establishment of a British Residency in Kathmandu, and an establishment of trade relations between the two states.) was finally signed between Nepal and East India Company. This led to the establishment of the first British Resident, Captain William O. Knox, who was reluctantly welcomed by the courtiers in Kathmandu on 16 April 1802. (Note: Knox had previously accompanied Captain William Kirkpatrick in the 1792 British diplomatic mission to Nepal as a Lieutenant in charge of the military escort. In Knox's 1801 mission, he was accompanied by experts like the naturalist Francis Buchanan-Hamilton, who later published An Account of the Kingdom of Nepal in 1819, and the surveyor Charles Crawford, who made the first scientific maps of Kathmandu valley and of Nepal, and proposed that the Himalayas might be among the highest mountains in the world.) The primary objective of Knox's mission was to bring the trade treaty of 1792 into full effect and to establish a "controlling influence" in Nepali politics. Almost eight months after the establishment of the Residency, Rajrajeshowri finally managed to assume the regency on 17 December 1802. Rajrajeshowri's presence in Kathmandu also stirred unrest among the courtiers that aligned themselves around her and Subarnaprabha. Sensing an imminent hostility, Knox aligned himself with Subarnaprabha and attempted to interfere with the internal politics of Nepal. Getting a wind of this matter, Rajrajeshowri dissolved the government and elected new ministers, with Damodar Pande as the Chief (Mul) Kaji in February 1803, while the Resident Knox, finding himself persona non grata and the objectives of his mission frustrated, voluntarily left Kathmandu to reside in Makwanpur citing a cholera epidemic.
