= Abhiman Singh Basnet =

Nepalese general (1744–1800)

Sri Mulkaji Sahib Abhiman Singh Basnyat
- श्री मूलकाजी साहेब अभिमान सिंह बस्न्यात
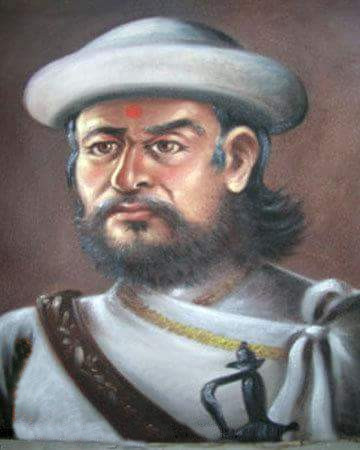

Mul (Chief) Kaji of Nepal
- In office 1785–1794
- Preceded by: Vamsharaj Pande
- Succeeded by: Kirtiman Singh Basnyat

Personal details
- Born: 1744 AD (1801 B.S.) Gorkha, kingdom of Nepal
- Died: 1800 AD (1857 B.S.) (Kaala Banzaar Limbuwan / ᤕᤠᤀᤷᤓᤢᤅ ᤗᤠᤈᤣ ) Present day Sunsari Nepal
- Parents: Shivaram Singh Basnyat (father); Suraprabha Thapa Basnyat (mother)
- Relatives: Naahar Singh Basnyat (brother); Kehar Singh Basnyat (brother); Dhokal Singh Basnyat (brother); Kirtiman Singh Basnyat (nephew); Bakhtawar Singh Basnyat (nephew)

Military service
- Allegiance: Nepal
- Rank: General
- Battles/wars: Sino-Nepalese War

Abhiman Singh Basnyat (Nepali: अभिमान सिंह बस्न्यात) was the first Commander-in-Chief of unified Nepal. Abhiman Singh became the first Commander in Chief after General Kalu Pande died during his second attempt to capture Kirtipur.

He had participated in invasion of Makawanpur during Unification of Nepal. He commanded battles in the Sino-Nepalese War as subordinate commander under Chautariya Shree Krishna Shah. He commanded and annexed Tanahun Kingdom into unified Nepal.

In 1794 AD, King Rana Bahadur Shah dissolved government to overthrow Bahadur Shah of Nepal. Kirtiman was appointed as Chief (Mul) Kaji among the four Kajis succeeding Abhiman Singh. In 1857 B.S., he was sent to settle the area of the Kirata regional areas comprising; Pallo Kirant Limbuwan, Majh Kirant Khambuwan and Wallo Kirant, then called Kaala Banzaar. It was a great injustice to him to being sent to this area at such age when he was already a Mulkaji. Abhiman Singh died at the age of fifty-six in 1857. He was reported to have died from a fever, possibly malaria.

== Early life and family ==
He was born on 1744 AD as third son of Basnyat nobleman Senapati Badabir Shivaram Singh Basnyat, who died in the battle of Sanga Chowk during Unification of Nepal on 1803 B.S. (1747 AD). He belonged to a Chhetri family. His father was of Shreepali Basnyat pedigree and his mother Surprabha was daughter of a Bagale Thapa nobleman.

Abhiman Singh had three brothers. His two elder brothers were Kazi Naahar Singh Basnyat and Kazi Kehar Singh Basnyat. His youngest brother, Kazi Dhokal Singh Basnyat, who became the governor of Kumaun, was the first owner of the present Narayanhity Palace.

== Gallery ==
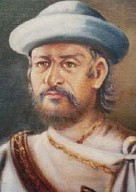
Portrait of Abhiman Singh Basnet
