= Balbhadra Shah =

Balbhadra Shah

Kaji Balbhadra Shah (Nepali: बलभद्र शाह) was a commander of the Nepali troops during the Sino-Nepalese War in 1788. He was the leader of the attack from Kerung Axis in 1788. His subordinates were Kaji Kirtiman Singh Basnyat, Sardar Amar Singh Thapa and Kapardar Bhotu Pande. He had 6,000 troops and 3,200 porters to call upon.
