= Raj Rajeshwari Devi =

Queen Raj Rajeshwari Devi
- Queen consort of Ghorka; Queen regent of Nepal
- Born: Kingdom of Nepal
- Died: 5 May 1806; Sankhu, Kingdom of Nepal
- Spouse: Rana Bahadur Shah
- Issue: Tilottoma Devi
Names
- Raj Rajeshwari Devi
- Dynasty: House of Shah (by birth)

Raj Rajeshwari Devi (Nepali: राज राजेश्वरी) (died 5 May 1806) was a queen consort and twice regent of Nepal. She was the Queen consort of Rana Bahadur Shah. She ruled as regent during the minority of her step-son Girvan Yuddha Bikram Shah in 1799, and in 1801–1804. She was forced to commit sati on the orders of Bhimsen Thapa, on the bank of the Salinadi rivulet, at Sankhu, 5 May 1806.

== Life ==
She was the granddaughter of Shiva Shah, Raja of Gulmi. In 1799, her consort abdicated to become a sanyasi, and she became regent in the name of her underage son. She ruled alongside the other two wives of her consort, Maharani Subarna Prabha Devi and Maharani Lalit Tripura Sundari Devi.

After her husband abdicated in favor of his son Girvan, Queen Rajeshwari became the regent. She, however, decided to accompany her husband to exile in Benaras. Queen Subarna Prabha then became the regent. On 26 July 1801, however, Queen Rajeshwari returned to Nepal. As a result, Subarnaprabha's favorite courtier Mul Kaji (Chief minister) Kirtiman Singh Basnyat was secretly assassinated on 28 September 1801, by the supporters of Rajrajeswori. She resumed her role as the regent, while Queen Subarna Prabha was put under house arrest.

In 1804, her husband returned and resumed power. Two years later, her spouse was assassinated by his brother, and ten days later, on 5 May 1806, Maharani Raj Rajeshwari Devi, as a Hindu widow, was forced to commit sati on the orders of Bhimsen Thapa. The sati took place on the bank of the Salinadi rivulet at Sankhu. Her co-regents, Subarna Prabha Devi and Lalit Tripura Sundari Devi, were not, however, forced to commit sati despite the fact that they were widows after the same man, and continued their rule as regents.
