= Vamsharaj Pande =

Top administrator in Nepal

Sri Dewan Sahib Vamsharaj Pande
- श्री देवान साहेब वंशराज पाँडे

Dewan of Kingdom of Nepal
- In office 1776–c. 1779
- Preceded by: Office established
- Succeeded by: Swarup Singh Karki
- In office c. 1782–1785
- Preceded by: Sarbajit Rana Magar
- Succeeded by: Abhiman Singh Basnyat

Personal details
- Born: 1739 A.D. Gorkha district, Nepal
- Died: 21 April 1785 Hanuman Dhoka Palace, Basantapur, Kathmandu
- Parent: Kalu Pande (father)
- Relatives: Ranashur Pande (brother); Damodar Pande (brother); Kirtiman Singh Basnyat (nephew)

Military service
- Rank: Kaji
- Battles/wars: Battle of Kirtipur; Battle of Bhaktapur; Battles of Unification of Nepal

Vamsharaj Pande (a.k.a. Bamsa Raj Pande, Vansha Raj Pande, or Bangsha Raj Pande) (Nepali: वंशराज पाँडे; translit. vaṃśarāja pām̐ḍe) was a Nepalese politician, military officer and minister of state. He was a significant army commander of Kingdom of Nepal in the second half of the 18th century. He was a follower of Bahadur Shah of Nepal and had a significant rivalry with Swaroop Singh Karki.

== Early life and family ==
He was born the eldest son of Kaji of Gorkha Kingdom Kalu Pande in 1739 A.D. He had two brothers, Ranashur Pande and Damodar Pande, and a sister, Chitravati Pande, who was married to Kaji Kehar Singh Basnyat of the noble Basnyat family.

== Career ==
Vamsharaj was made a Kaji on Marwat policy (Note: Marwat policy refers as military recruitment of a person, mainly sons, in the position of his father who was killed in a war.) in V.S. 1819 (1762 A.D.). On 20 January 1763, Vamsha Raj Pande won a battle against Mir Qasim, the Nawab of Bengal. On 14 April 1769 A.D., he was the army commander who led the Gorkhali attack in the Battle of Bhaktapur. After consolidation of Kathmandu valley states, King Prithvi Narayan Shah waged war against western Chaubise (24) Confederacy on 1770 under the military leadership of Kaji Bamsharaj, Kaji Kehar Singh Basnyat and Sardar Prabhu Malla and achieved initial success. On 1771, the Gorkhali forces lost the war against Chaubise (24) principalities and Kaji Kehar Singh Basnyat died on the battlefield. In the same war, Bamsharaj was captured by soldiers of Parbat Kingdom as war prisoner. His subordinate commanders Dhaukal Singh Basnyat and Sriharsha Pantha escaped with difficulty after the tough confrontation at Dhor. The document dated Bikram Samvat 1833 Bhadra Vadi 3 Roj 6 (i.e. Friday 2 August 1776), shows that he had carried the title of Dewan along with Swaroop Singh Karki. It was the time when he had just returned from the Parbat prison.

Chaubisi confederacy attacked Gorkha Kingdom on Sirhanchowk Gadhi (fort) at north and established their own position on 2 January 1782 A.D. Commander Garud Dhoj Pant of Tanahun Kingdom launched attack on Gorkhali side with combined army of Lamjung and Parbat and also included soldiers from Kaski, Palpa and Pyuthan. Queen Rajendra Lakshmi Devi wanted ultimate destruction of trade route of Lamjung. Thus, Bamsharaj was called back from his exile in Bettiah to launch attack on Lamjung Kingdom. Queen regent Rajendra Laxmi Devi also called up exiled courtier and his rival Swaroop Singh Karki to attack on Lamjung Kingdom. A reconciliation was reached between both courtiers. Subsequently, Vamsharaj imposed economic blockade over Lamjung. Bamsharaj's youngest brother Damodar Pande also took part in the attack.

Vamsharaj had fought battles against Makwanpur, Timal and Sindhuli in 1762, Kirtipur in 1764, Chihan Danda in 1766, Tanahun in 1770, Pauwa Gadh in 1776, and Lamjung in 1783 A.D.

== Death at Bhandarkhal ==
Bamsha Raj was beheaded on the conspiracy of Queen Rajendra Laxmi with the help of supporters including senior minister Kaji Swarup Singh Karki. In the special tribunal meeting at Bhandarkhal garden, east of Kathmandu Durbar, Swaroop Singh held Bamsa Raj liable for letting the King of Parbat, Kirtibam Malla, to run away in the battle a year before. He was declared guilty and was executed by beheading on the tribunal. Daniel Wright points out that King Rana Bahadur Shah was responsible for giving Bamsha Raj the death penalty. Historian Rishikesh Shah and Ganga Karmacharya claim that he was executed on March 1785. Bhadra Ratna Bajracharya and Tulsi Ram Vaidya claim that he was executed on 21 April 1785. On 2 July 1785, Prince Regent Bahadur Shah of Nepal who was aligned to him was arrested.

== Title of premiership ==
Daniel Wright mentions him as the Mantri-Nayak (Prime Minister) under the King Rana Bahadur Shah. The document dated Bikram Samvat 1833 Bhadra Vadi 3 Roj 6 (i.e. Friday 2 August 1776), shows that he had carried the title of Dewan (equivalent to Prime Minister) along with Swaroop Singh Karki. He had a great constant rivalry with Swaroop Singh Karki in the reign of King Pratap Singh Shah.
