= Kalu Pande =

Nepalese Noble Administrator

Sri Kaji Vamshidhar "Kalu" Pande
- काजी वंशीधर "कालु" पाँडे
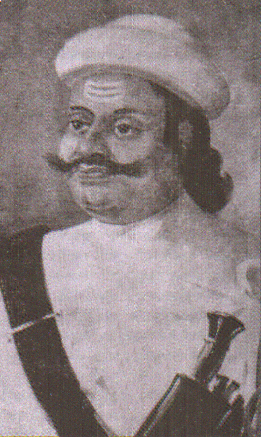
- Kaji Kalu Pandey of Gorkha Kingdom

Chief of the Nepalese Army
- In office ca. 1746 - 1757
- Preceded by: Prithvi Narayan Shah
- Succeeded by: Vamsharaj Pande, Abhiman Singh Basnet

Personal details
- Born: Vamshidhar Pande; 1713 A.D. Gorkha Kingdom (present day Gorkha District, Nepal)
- Died: 1757 A.D. (aged 43-44) Tyanglaphant Kirtipur, Kirtipur Kingdom (present day Kathmandu District, Nepal)
- Children: Vamsharaj Pande, Ranashur Pande, Damodar Pande, Chitravati Pande
- Parent: Kaji Bhimraj Pande (father)
- Relatives: Pande dynasty Basnyat family

Military service
- Battles/wars: Battle of Kirtipur, Unification of Nepal

Vamshidhar Pande (Nepali: वंशीधर पाँडे) known by Alias Kalu Pande (Nepali: कालु पाँडे) was a Nepalese politician and general who was appointed as Kaji of the Gorkha Kingdom. He was born in 1713 A.D. in a Gorkha family. He was the commander of the Gorkhali forces during the Unification Campaign of Nepal who died in the first Battle of Kirtipur in 1757 A.D. Pande's real name was Banshidhar Pande. He was a son of Kaji Bhimraj Pande who was minister during reign of King Prithivipati Shah of Gorkha. He was descendant of Minister of Gorkha and Dravya Shah's accomplice Ganesh Pande. He had three sons: Dewan Kajisaheb Vamsharaj Pande, Sardar Ranasur Pande and Mulkaji Sahib Damodar Pande (1st PM of Nepal).

== Family ==
Pande was born in 1713 A.D to Kaji Bhimraj Pande. He was a descendant of Ganesh Pande, who was the first Kaji (Prime Minister) of King Dravya Shah of Gorkha Kingdom established in 1559 A.D. The Pandes were considered as Thar Ghar or aristrocratic family who assisted in the administration of the Gorkha Kingdom. Kaji Kalu Pande (1714-1757) belonged to this family and became a war hero after he died at Battle of Kirtipur. These Pandes were categorized with fellow Chhetri Bharadars such as Thapas, Basnyats and Kunwar family.

=== Relation with Kaji Tularam Pande ===
Generally, historians conclude his relation to Kaji Tularam Pande of Gorkha. As per Historian Baburam Acharya, Tularam was a brother (first cousin) of Kaji Bhimraj Pande, the father of Kalu Pande. However, Historian Rishikesh Shah contends that Tularam was a brother of Kalu Pande.

== Career ==
Kalu Pande was made the Commander-in-Chief of the Gorkhali Army after Biraj Thapa Magar and his first major Battle was the Battle of Kirtipur. Despite his initial resentment to the fact that the valley kings were well prepared and the Gorkhalis were not, Pande gave a 'Yes' to the operation, due to being insisted by Prithvi Narayan Shah. The Gorkhalis had set up a base on Naikap, a hill on the valley's western rim, from where they were to mount their assaults on Kirtipur. They were armed with swords, bows and arrows and muskets.

== Battle of Kirtipur ==
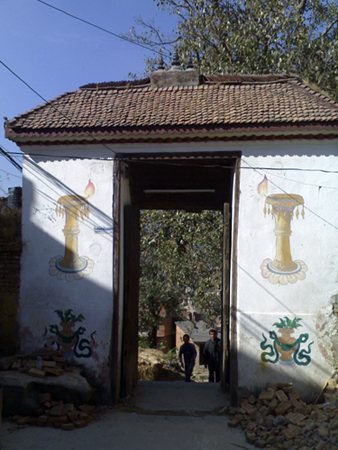
One of the city gates through which the Gorkhalis entered Kirtipur.

The Battle of Kirtipur occurred in 1767 during the Gorkha conquest of Nepal, and was fought at Kirtipur, one of the principal towns in the Kathmandu Valley. Kirtipur was then a walled town of 800 houses and part of the kingdom of Lalitpur. It is spread along the top of a ridge.

The battle between the Newars of the valley and the invading Gorkhalis marked a turning point in the war of expansion launched by Gorkhali king Prithvi Narayan Shah. It led to his subjugation of the rest of the coveted valley and the end of Newar rule. The Gorkhalis had set up a base on Dahachok, a hill on the valley's western rim, from where they mounted their assaults on Kirtipur. They were armed with swords, bows and arrows and muskets.

During the first assault in 1757, the Gorkhali army was badly beaten. As they advanced towards Kirtipur, the Newars went to meet them under the command of Kaji Danuvanta. The two forces fought on the plain of Tyangla Phant in the north-west of Kirtipur. The Newars defended their town ferociously. The Gorkhali commander Kalu Pande was killed, and the Gorkhali king himself barely escaped with his life into the surrounding hills disguised as a saint.

The Valley Kings brought a large number of Doyas from Indian Plains under Shaktiballabh sardar. During the first assault in 1757, the Gorkhali army killed 1200 enemies, mostly Doyas, but were badly beaten themselves. Both sides suffered heavy losses. As they advanced towards Kirtipur, the combined force of Valley Kings under Kaji Gangadhar Jha, Kaji Gangaram Thapa and Sardar Shaktiballabh brought Havoc to the outnumbered Gorkhalis. The two forces fought on the plain of Tyangla Phant in the northwest of Kirtipur. Surapratap Shah, the King's brother lost his right eye to an arrow while scaling the city wall. The Gorkhali commander Kaji Kalu Pande was beheaded by kantipur's king jay prakash malla himself, and the Gorkhali king himself narrowly escaped with his life into the surrounding hills disguised as a saint.

=== King's disheartenment ===
King Prithvi Narayan Shah's letter to Sardar Ramakrishna Kunwar mentioned by historian Baburam Acharya quotes disheartenment of King Prithvi over death of Kalu Pande: "When Kalu Pande was killed in Kirtipur, I had felt disheartened, thinking that I had not been able to conquer the three towns of Nepal."

== Marital Relationship with Basnyats ==
King Prithvi Narayan Shah formed an alliance with Basnyat and Pande families of Gorkha in his quest for the unification of Nepal. As per his Divya Upadesh, King Prithvi Narayan is known to have arranged the marriage between Kaji Kehar Singh Basnyat, the second son of Senapati Badabir Shivaram Singh Basnyat, and Mukhiyani Chitra Devi, the daughter of Kaji Kalu Pande. Shivaram Singh Basnyat was addressed as Senapati Badabir (Brave Chief of the Army) in all the documents of that era. He died in the defensive battle of Sanga Chowk during Unification of Nepal on 1803 B.S.

== Kalu Pande memorial ==
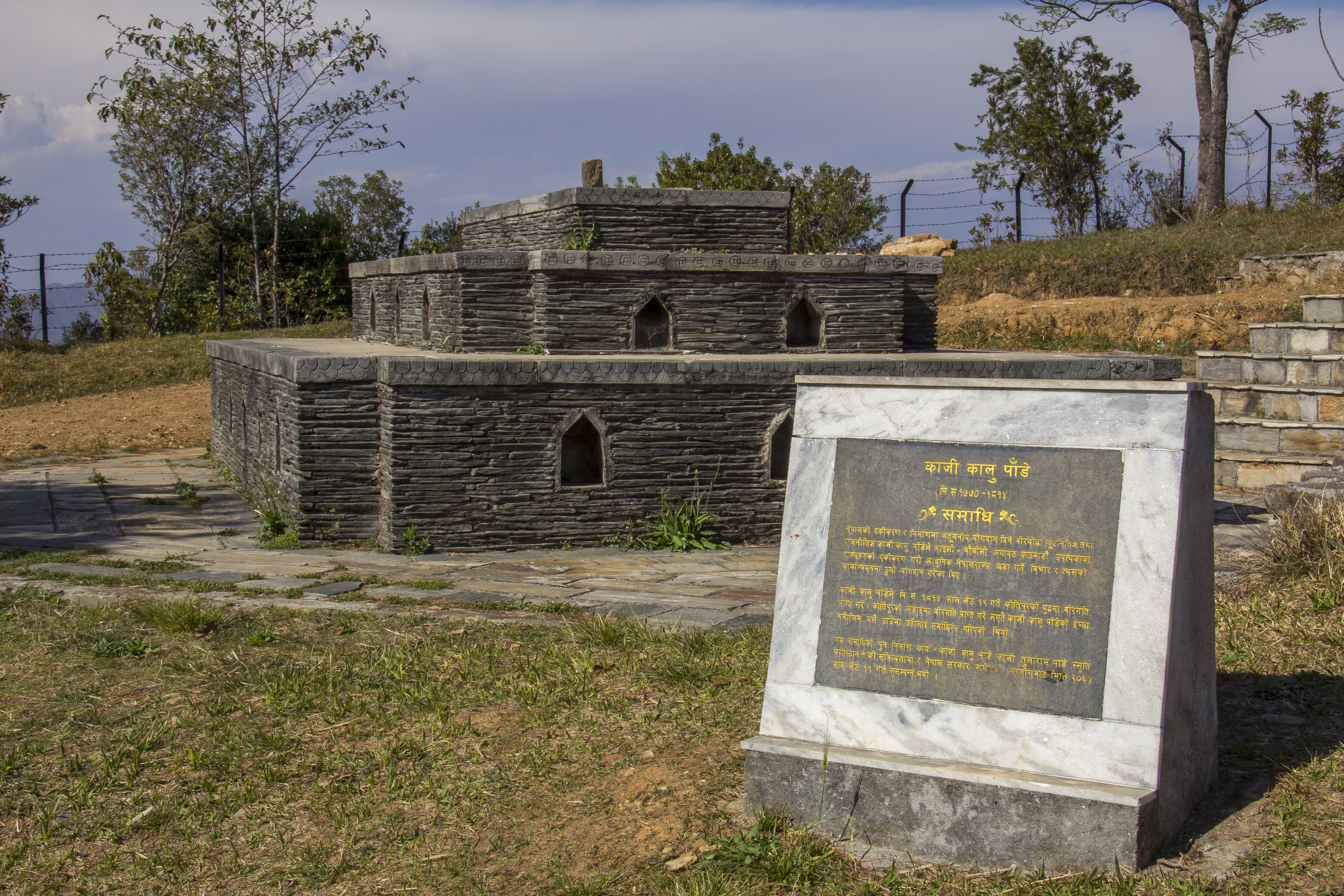
Kalu Pande Memorial Park, the grave of highly dignified Pande war hero Kalu Pande

The burial ground of Kaji Kalu Pande is situated on a hilltop. It lies in Chandragiri, on the western outskirts of Kathmandu, from where areas associated with the former Gorkha Kingdom, including regions west of the Trishuli River now forming part of present-day Dhading District, can be seen. It is said that Kalu Pande requested to be buried where he could see his homeland of Gorkha Kingdom; accordingly, he was buried at that site. It is also called Kalu Pande Hill and is a popular hiking destination.

A national highway in Dhading District is named after him, known as the Kalu Pandey Highway (National Highway 43), which runs through northern parts of the district.

== Gallery ==
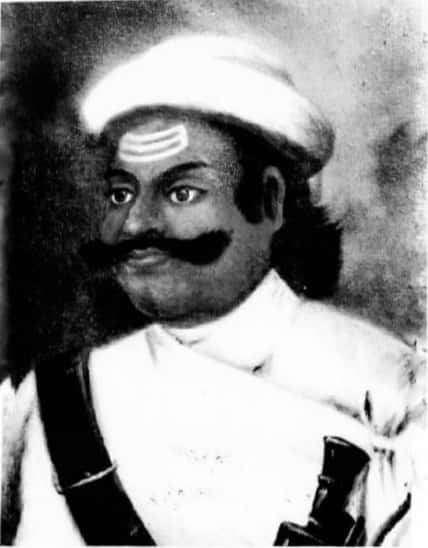
Bamshidhar Kalu Pande

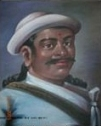
Kalu Pande

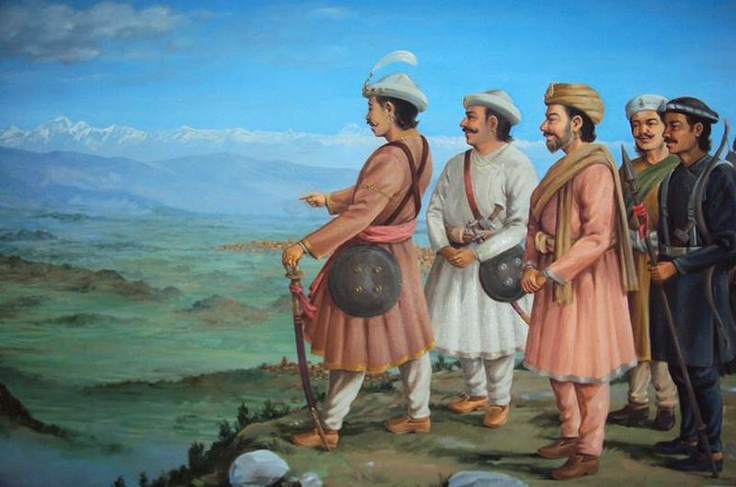
Unification during battle field

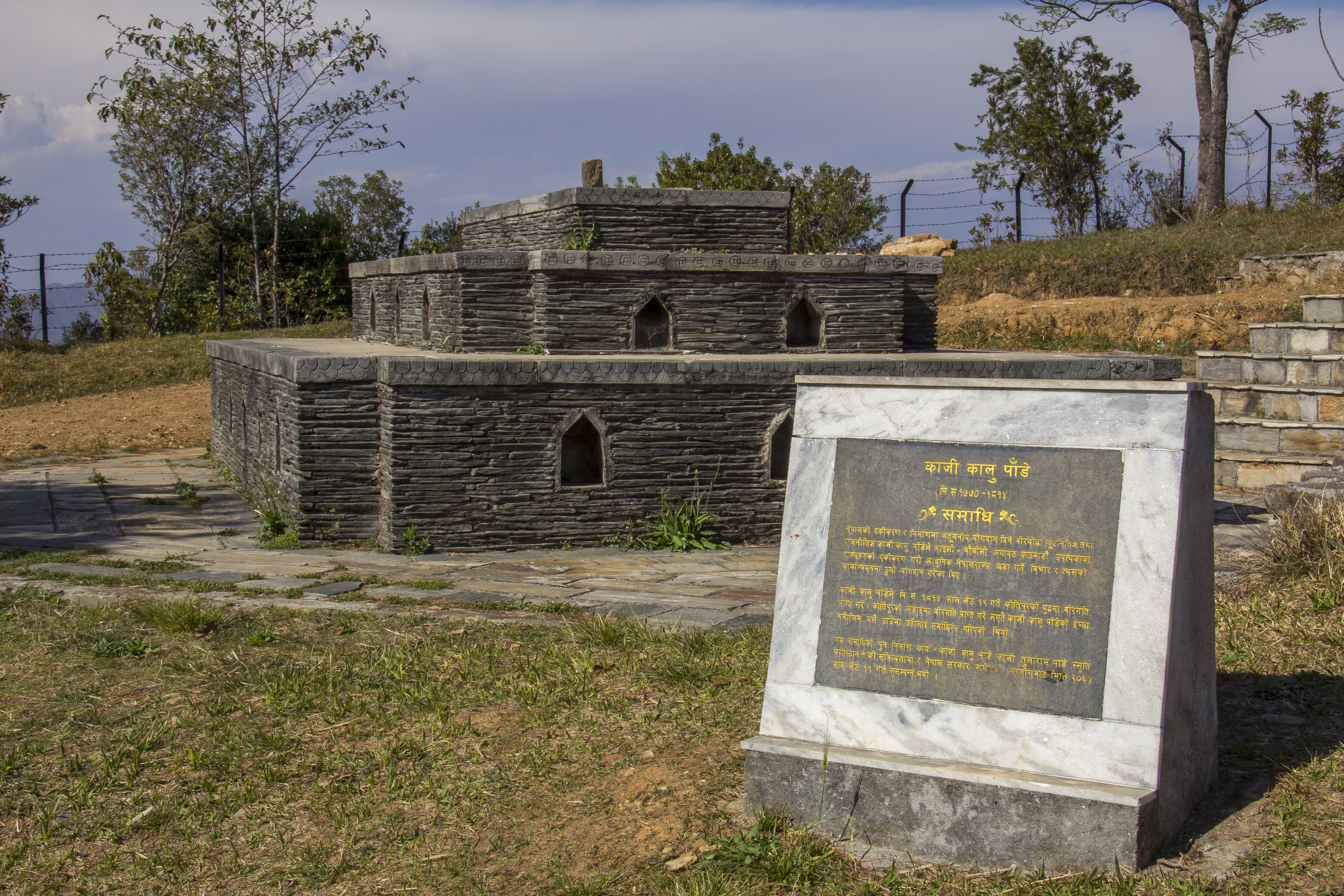
Memorial where Kalu Pande was assassinated in 1814 B.S.

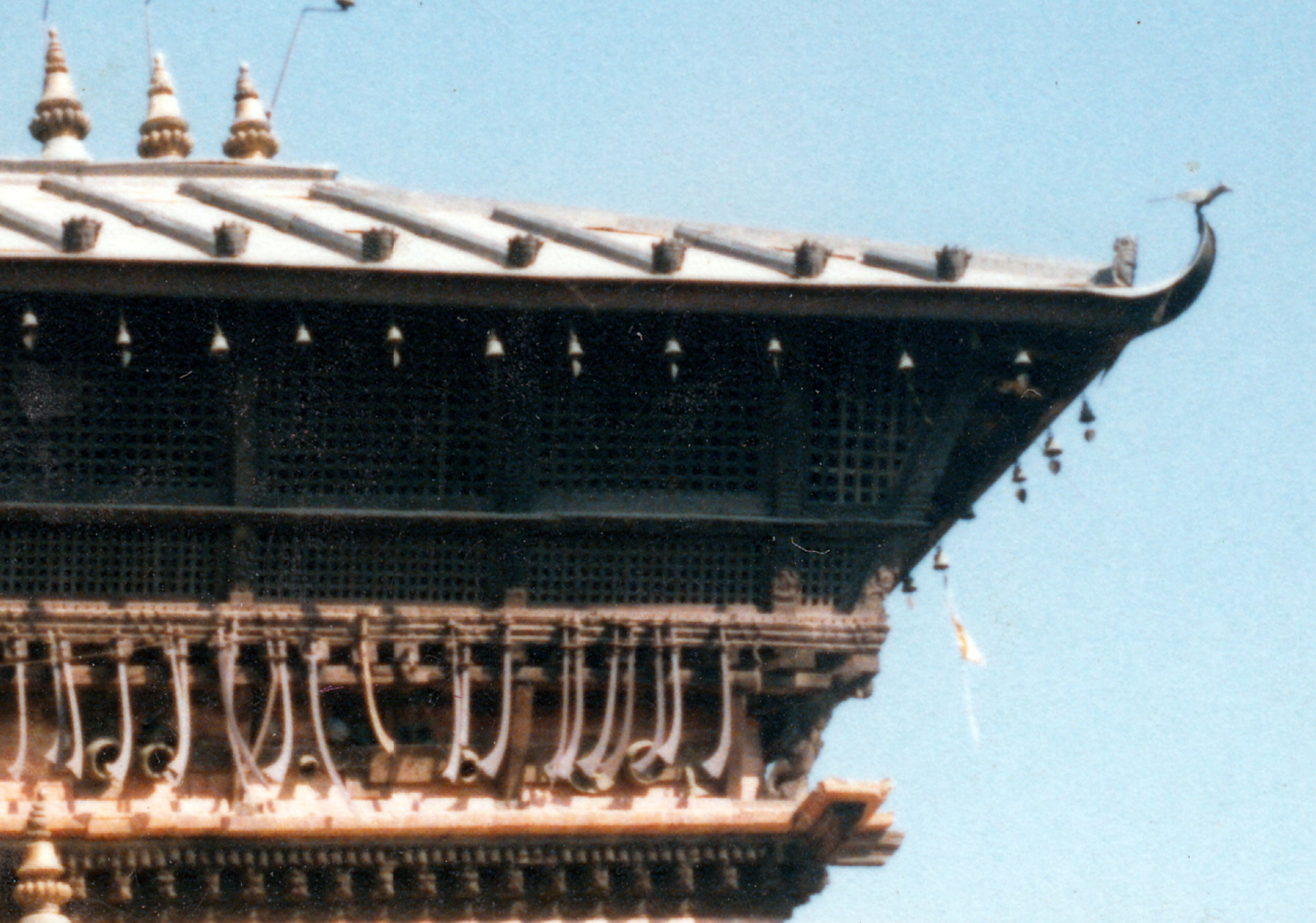
Swords of Kaji Kalu Pande and his soldiers at Bagh Bhairab temple, Kirtipur

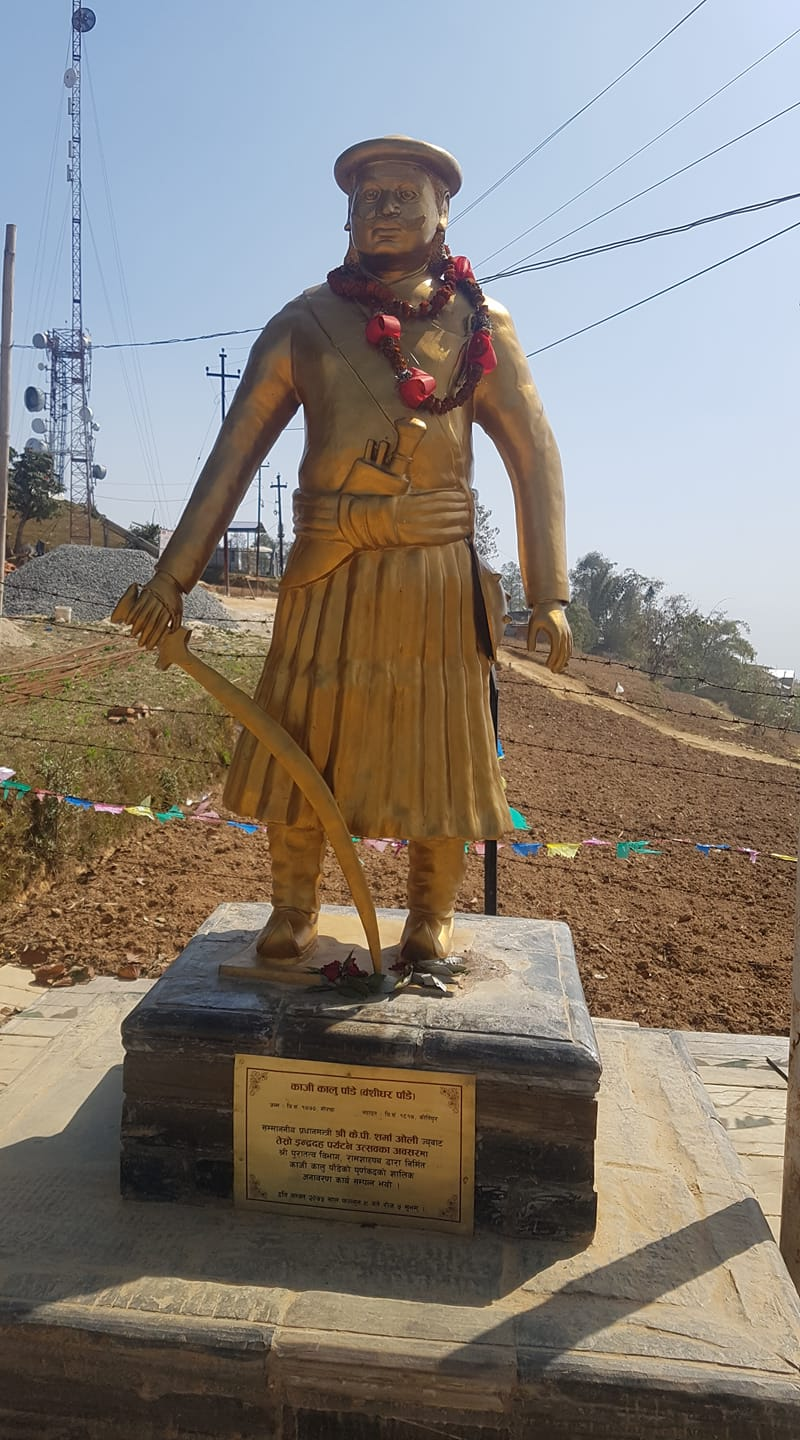
Kaji Kalu Pande statue at Dahachowk
