= Shivaram Singh Basnyat =

Military commander of Gorkha

Senapati Badabir Shivaram Singh Basnyat
- सेनापति बडावीर शिवराम सिंह बस्न्यात
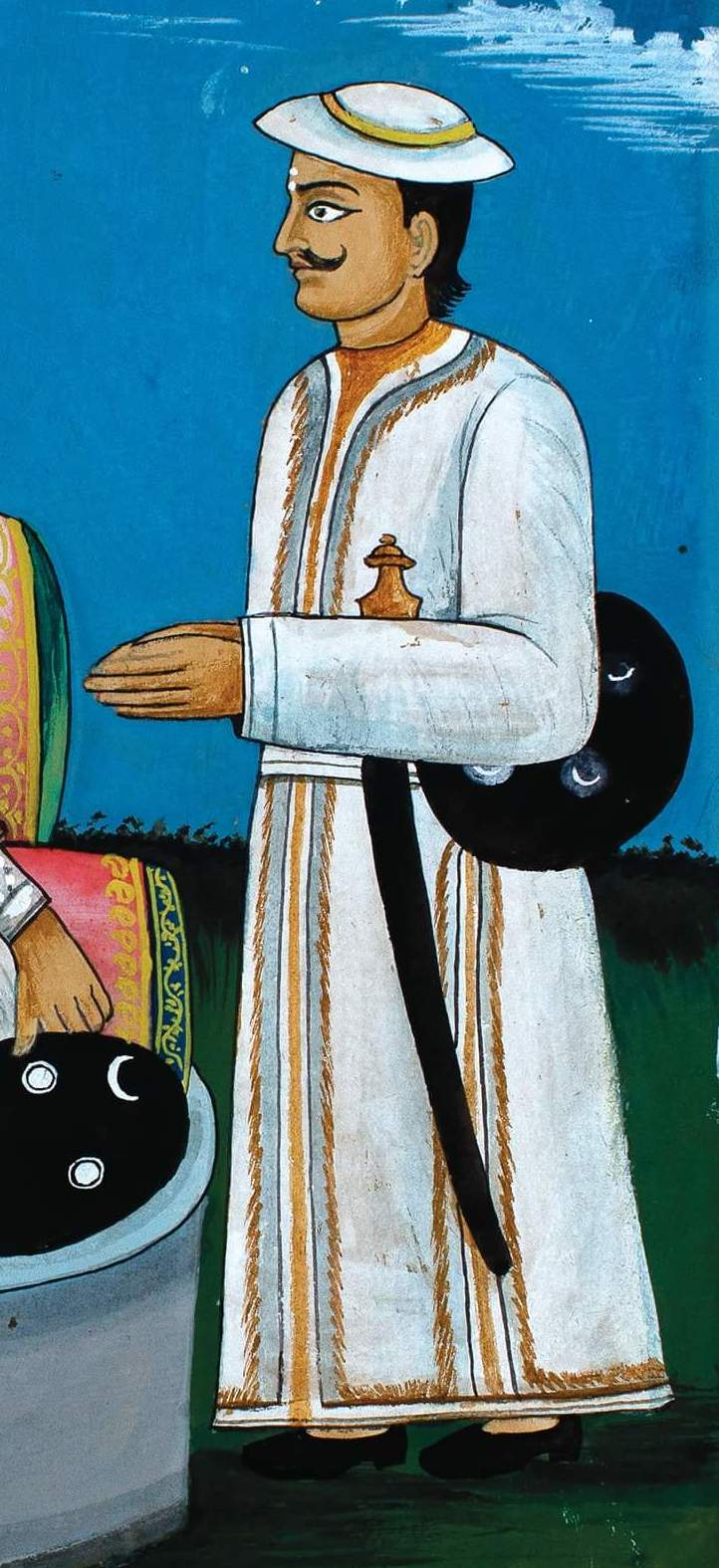
- Senapati Shivaram Singh Basnyat consulting King Prithvi Narayan Shah

Chief of Nepalese Army
- In office 1743 – February 1747
- Preceded by: Prithivi Narayan Shah
- Succeeded by: Kalu Pande

Personal details
- Born: Gorkha Kingdom
- Died: Sangachok 1747 AD (12th Fagun 1803 B.S.)
- Children: Naahar Singh Basnyat; Kehar Singh Basnyat; Abhiman Singh Basnyat; Dhokal Singh Basnyat
- Relatives: see Basnyat dynasty, Pande dynasty, Thapa dynasty

Military service
- Allegiance: Gorkha Kingdom Nepal
- Rank: General
- Battles/wars: Unification of Nepal

Shivaram Singh Basnyat (Nepali: शिवराम सिंह बस्न्यात) was the military commander of Gorkha. After the conquest of Naldum area by the Gorkhalis, he along with Commander Bir Bhadra Thapa conquered Sanga, Panauti, Sankhu and adjacent areas. They received fierce resistance from the Kantipur Kingdom at Sangachok. He died in the defensive battle of Sanga Chowk during Unification of Nepal on 1803 B.S.

== Personal life ==
He was born to Jayaraj Singh Basnyat in the clan of Shreepali/Sripali among Basnyats. He had four sons - Naahar Singh Basnyat, Kehar Singh Basnyat, Abhiman Singh Basnet and Dhokal Singh Basnyat. His third son went on to become Supreme Commander of the Nepalese Army and Chief Minister (Mulkazi) in the Royal Court.

== Gallery ==
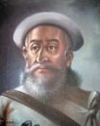
Shivaram Singh Basnyat
