= Unification of Nepal =

Series of battles that shaped modern day Nepal

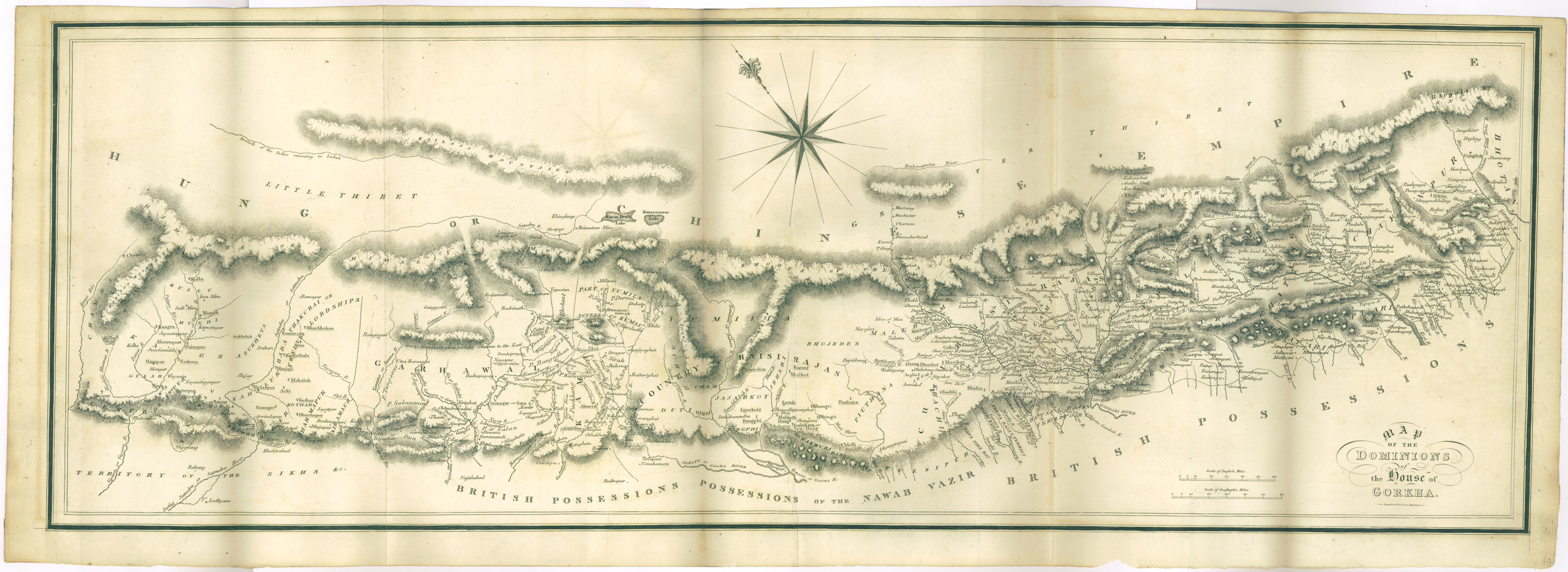
- Territories unified by the Gorkha Kingdom
- Native name: नेपालको एकीकरण
- Date: 26 September 1744 – 4 March 1816 (71 years, 5 months and 7 days)
- Location: Kingdom of Nepal
- Type: National unification
- Outcome: Decisive Gorkhali victory; Annexation of the Malla kingdoms of Kathmandu Valley; Formation of the unified Kingdom of Nepal; Relocation of the capital to Kathmandu; Annexation of the Baise, Chaubisi, Sen and various other kingdoms; Final boundaries established by the Treaty of Sugauli

The Unification of Nepal (Nepali: नेपालको एकीकरण, romanized: Nēpālakō ēkīkaraṇa) was the historical process of military conquest, strategic diplomacy, and state-building through which the Hill Kingdom of Gorkha unified dozens of fragmented kingdoms into the sovereign state of modern Nepal. Initiated in 1743 CE (1799 BS) by King Prithvi Narayan Shah upon his ascension to the Gorkha throne, the unification campaign spanned over seven decades, concluding after the Anglo-Nepalese War with the Treaty of Sugauli in 1816 CE (1872 BS), which established the nation's formal international boundaries.

Prior to the campaign, the Himalayan region was divided among scores of warring kingdoms. These included the prosperous Malla kingdoms of the Kathmandu Valley, the Chaubisi Rajya (24 kingdoms) of the Gandaki basin, the Baise Rajya (22 kingdoms) of the Karnali region, and various chiefdoms in the east. Motivated by economic objectives, control over lucrative trans-Himalayan trade routes to Tibet, and a strategic desire to prevent European colonialism, Gorkhali forces captured Nuwakot in 1744 CE and annexed the Kathmandu Valley between 1768 CE and 1769 CE. Upon conquering the valley, Prithvi Narayan Shah relocated his capital from Gorkha to Kathmandu and formally adopted the name "Nepal"—a term that had previously referred only to the Kathmandu Valley—for his entire unified empire. Following his death in 1775 CE, expansion accelerated under his successors, most notably during the regencies of Queen Rajendra Laxmi and Regent Bahadur Shah, extending Gorkha rule from the Teesta River in the east to the Sutlej River in the west.

The unification consolidated the central Himalayas under a single administration, preventing East India Company hegemony over the region and laying the foundation for modern Nepalese sovereignty.

== Background ==
The regions that constitute present-day Nepal were scattered as numerous independent kingdoms prior to unification. The Kathmandu Valley, then called Nepal Mandala, alone contained three independent kingdoms: Kantipur, Lalitpur, and Bhadgaon. Makwanpur, to the south of the valley, was ruled by the Sen dynasty. To the east of the valley were two relatively larger kingdoms: Vijayapur, and Chaudandi. Both of these kingdoms once belonged to Makawanpur, but Mukunda Sena (r. 1518–1553) had partitioned his kingdom among his sons and relatives and had divided the once large Makawanpur into various principalities.

Between the rivers Trishuli and Bheri, known as the Gandaki region, were the Chaubisi principalities. Further west, in the Karnali region, were the Baise principalities. Baise and Chaubise literally translate to twenty-two and twenty-four kingdoms respectively, but the exact number of kingdoms wasn't the same as the regions' collective names. The Baises were once a part of the Khasa Kingdom, ruled by the Khas Mallas from the Sinja valley, before its fragmentation. The Chaubisi principalities belonged to various political entities. Some belonged to the Senas, some to the Khas Mallas, and some to the Shahis.

These principalities experienced constant change and instability. Several kingdoms made leagues in order to protect themselves from foreign invasions and for mutual growth. However, due to the economic and geographic conditions prevalent at that time, disputes and battles between the kingdoms were frequent. The Malla kings of the valley engaged in incessant conflicts and skirmishes among themselves and had, at several instances, requested the intervention of Gorkha to settle their disputes.

== Battle campaigns ==
=== Nuwakot ===
Prithvi Narayan Shah's annexation campaign began with the nearby kingdom of Nuwakot. Nuwakot marked the eastern boundary of the Gorkha Kingdom and was part of the trade route between Tibet and Kathmandu. It was also the western gateway to the Kathmandu Valley. Nara Bhupal Shah, Prithvi Narayan Shah's father, had attempted to invade Nuwakot in 1700, but failed. At that time, Nuwakot was under the administrative control of Kantipur (known today as Kathmandu). Kantipur supported Nuwakot against the invasion. Following his defeat, Nara Bhupal Shah gave up his efforts and handed administrative power over to his eldest son, Prithvi Narayan Shah and Chandraprabhawati, his eldest queen.

In the very year of his coronation, Prithvi Narayan Shah sent Gorkhali troops under Kaji Biraj Thapa Magar to attack Nuwakot. The campaign failed.

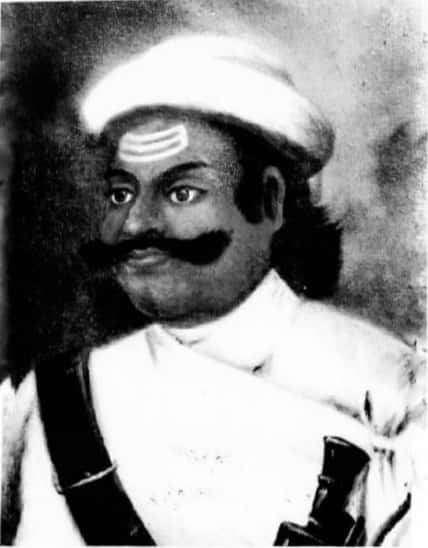
Kalu Pande, a Kaji of Gorkha Kingdom.

Kalu Pande was then made Commander-in-Chief of the Gorkhali Army. Jayant Rana Magar (former Kaji of Gorkha) was made General of the kingdom of Kantipur by Jaya Prakash Malla to defend Nuwakot against Gorkha. Kalu Pande advised Prithvi Narayan Shah to raise a standing army by conscripting men from other regions. A newly fortified Gorkhali force again attacked Nuwakot in 1744 from three sides and managed to capture the hill fort on September 26, 1744. However, the next year, King Jaya Prakash Malla of Kantipur sent a force under Kashiram Thapa to retake the fort, after defeating the Gorkhali forces at Naldum. Kashiram was repelled and the Gorkhali seized permanent control of Nuwakot.

=== Tanahun ===
While Prithvi Narayan Shah was occupied with Nuwakot, Tanahun, a small kingdom to the west, took advantage of the king's absence to invade the Gorkha kingdom. Tanahun troops crossed the Chepe river and captured Sirhanchowk. But reinforcements from both Nuwakot and Gorkha managed to rout the invaders and considerably weaken Lamjung.

Prithvi Narayan Shah wanted to use the occasion to invade Tanahun and annex it. However, he was advised against an open attack as King Tribikram Sen of Tanahun was an old friend of his father's. Prithvi Narayan Shah thus invited Tribikram Sen to the banks of the Trishuli river on the pretext of a friendly visit and then took him into custody. Tribikram Sen was imprisoned in Nuwakot and Tanahun was officially annexed to the burgeoning Gorkha Empire.

=== Makwanpur and Hariharpur ===
As part of his goal of taking the Kathmandu Valley, Prithvi Narayan had planned to first conquer all of the kingdoms and principalities surrounding the Kathmandu Valley.

Sensing danger, King Digbardhan Sen and his minister Kanak Singh Baniya of Makwanpur sent their families to safer grounds before they were encircled by the Gorkhalis, who launched an attack on 17 August 1762. The battle lasted for around eight hours and while Makwanpur was annexed, King Digbardhan and Kanak Singh escaped to Hariharpur Gadhi.

After occupying the Makwanpur, the Gorkhali forces planned to take Hariharpur Gadhi, a strategic fort on a mountain ridge of the Mahabharat range, also south of Kathmandu. It controlled another route to the Kathmandu valley. On 4 October 1762, the Gorkhalis launched Hariharpur. The soldiers there fought valiantly against the Gorkha forces, but were ultimately forced to vacate the fort. About 500 soldiers from Hariharpur died in the battle.

Digbardhan Sen sought the help of Mir Qasim, the Nawab of Bengal, to help defend against the Gorkhalis. Mir Qasim, sought to gain loot and plunder from the invasion, as he was using lavish gifts to get on the East India Company's good side. In December 1762, he sent around 3,500 troops under Gurgin Khan (also known as Khoja Gregory), an Armenian man who had helped train Mir Qasim's army, to launch an attack on Makwanpur, which had only recently been captured by the Gorkhalis.

Mir Qasim's forces arrived in Makwanpur in January 1763 and launched an attack on Dadhuwa Gadhi, one of three defensive positions the Gorkhalis had set up around Makwanpur fort. Gurgin Khan's 3,500 soldiers managed to capture Dadhuwa Gadhi from 400 or so Gorkha soldiers. On 21 January 1763, 3,300 of Gurgin Khan's soldiers launched an attack on Makwanpur palace. The Gorkhalis, under Prithvi Narayan's brother Nandu Shah, held off the invaders. Supplemented by reinforcements, the Gorkhalis counter-attacked Gurgin Khan in the dead of the night while his soldiers were asleep. The Gorkhalis managed to rout Gurgin Khan's forces, who retreated back to Bengal.

=== Kathmandu Valley (Nepal Mandala) ===
The Shah kings had long set their sights on the Nepal Valley, now also known as Kathmandu Valley, which was host to three wealthy but constantly warring city-states ruled by the Malla dynasty. After conquering Nuwakot, which was the western gateway to the Kathmandu Valley, the Gorkhalis aimed for Kirtipur as their next target. Kirtipur was a small fortified city on the outskirts of the three major city-states ruled by Newar Malla kings.

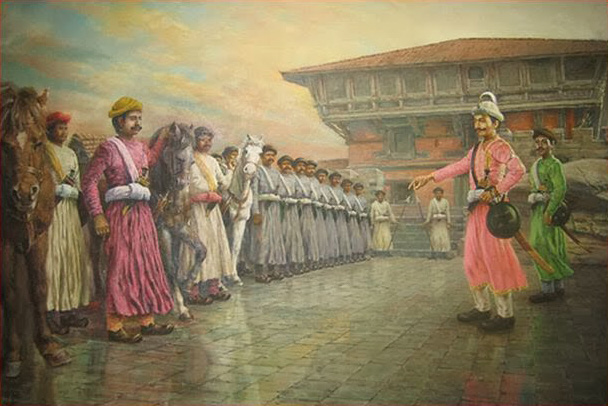
Gorkhali soldiers preparing war against Kathmandu Valley

Despite his initial assessment that the valley kings were well prepared and the Gorkhalis were not, Kalu Pande agreed to lead the battle. In 1757, The Gorkhalis set up a base on Naikap to mount their assault on Kirtipur. They were armed with swords, bows and muskets. The two forces fought on the plain of Tyangla Phant in the northwest of Kirtipur. Kalu Pande was killed in the battle while Prithvi Narayan himself narrowly escaped with his life into the surrounding hills disguised as a saint.

In 1764, Prithvi Narayan assaulted Kirtipur a second time. The attacking forces were under the command of Surapratap Shah, Prithvi Narayan's brother. The Gorkhalis were defeated once again and Surapratap lost his right eye to an arrow while scaling the city. A noble of Lalitpur named Danuvanta crossed over to Shah's side and let the Gorkhalis into the town.

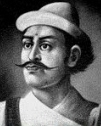
Sardar Ram Krishna Kunwar, senior military commander of Gorkhali forces

The victory in the Battle of Kirtipur made Shah's two-decade-long effort to take possession of the Kathmandu Valley possible.

After the fall of Kirtipur, Shah took the city-state of Kathmandu in 1768. That same year he also took possession of Lalitpur. In 1769 he took possession of Bhaktapur, completing his conquest of the Nepal Valley. In a letter to Ram Krishna Kunwar, King Prithvi Narayan Shah was unhappy at the death of Kaji Kalu Pande in Kirtipur and thought it was impossible to conquer Kathmandu Valley after the death of Kalu Pande. After the annexation of Kathmandu Valley, King Prithvi Narayan Shah praised in his letter about the valour and wisdom shown by Ramkrishna in the annexation of Kathmandu, Lalitpur and Bhaktapur (i.e. the Nepal valley at the time) in 1768-69 A.D. Similarly, Vamsharaj Pande, Kalu Pande's eldest son, was the army commander who led attack of Gorkhali side on the Battle of Bhaktapur on 14 April 1769 A.D.

After his conquest of the Kathmandu Valley, Prithvi Narayan Shah conquered other smaller territories south of the valley to keep other smaller fiefdoms near his Gurkha state out of British rule. After his kingdom spread from north to south, he made Kantipur the capital of the expanded country, which was then known as the Kingdom of Gorkha (Gorkha Samrajya).

=== Sen and Kirat Kingdom ===
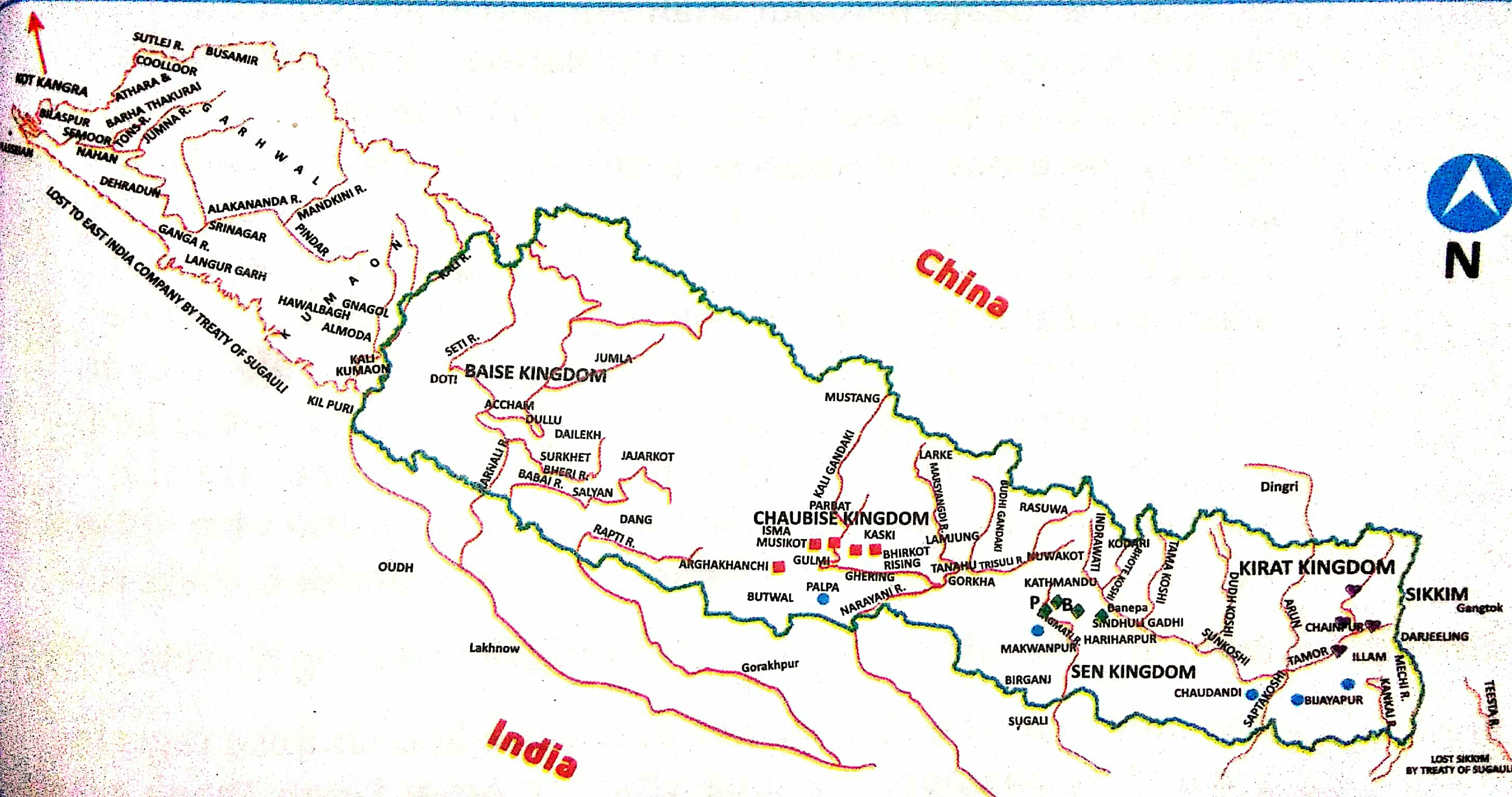
Lost territories of Nepal after Treaty of Sugauli showing Kirat and Sen Kingdom in the eastern side

After Prithvi Narayan Shah conquered the Kathmandu Valley in 1768–69, Gorkhali expansion moved eastward. In 1772, Gorkhali forces under commanders including Ram Krishna Kunwar and Abhiman Singh Basnet advanced through the Kirat Region, reaching areas around the Dudhkoshi, Dingla and Arun–Chainpur. The incorporation of Majh Kirat and Chainpur was followed by further expansion toward the eastern territories.

In 1773, the Gorkhalis captured Chaudandi, followed by the incorporation of Bijayapur around 1773–74. Gorkhali sovereignty was subsequently established over much of Pallo Kirat/Limbuwan, through both military pressure and political agreements. The 1774 Gorkha–Limbu settlement is particularly significant because it allowed important customary kipat land rights to continue.

== Post Prithvi Narayan Shah ==
In 1775 CE, the conqueror king Prithvi Narayan Shah, who expanded the Gorkha Kingdom into the Kingdom of Nepal died at Devighat, Nuwakot. Swarup Singh Karki, a shrewd Gorkhali courtier from a Chhetri family of Eastern Nepal, marched with an army to Nuwakot to confine Prince Bahadur Shah of Nepal who was then mourning the death of his father former King Prithvi Narayan Shah. He confined Bahadur Shah and Prince Dal Mardan Shah with consent from newly reigning King Pratap Singh Shah who was considered to have no distinction of right and wrong. In the annual Pajani (renewal) of that year, Swarup Singh was promoted to the position of Kaji along with Abhiman Singh Basnyat, Amar Singh Thapa and Parashuram Thapa. In Falgun 1832 B.S., he succeeded in exiling Bahadur Shah, Dal Mardan Shah and Guru Gajraj Mishra on three heinous charges. The reign of King Pratap Singh was characterized by the constant rivalry between Swarup and Vamsharaj Pande, a member of the leading Pande family of Gorkha. The document dated Bikram Samvat 1833 Bhadra Vadi 3 Roj 6 (i.e. Friday 2 August 1776), shows that he had carried the title of Dewan along with Vamsharaj Pande. King Pratap Singh Shah died on 22 November 1777 A.D. leaving his infant son Rana Bahadur Shah as the King of Nepal. Sarbajit Rana Magar was made a Kaji along with Balbhadra Shah and Vamsharaj Pande while Daljit Shah was chosen as Chief Chautariya. Historian Dilli Raman Regmi asserts that Sarbajit Rana Magar was chosen as Chief Kazi (equivalent to Prime Minister of Nepal). Historian Rishikesh Shah asserts that Sarbajit Rana Magar was the head of the Nepalese government for a short period in 1778. Afterwards, rivalry arose between Prince Bahadur Shah of Nepal and Queen Rajendra Laxmi. In the rivalry, Sarbajit Rana led the followers of the Queen opposed to Sriharsh Pant who led the followers of Bahadur Shah. The group of Bharadars (officers) led by Sarbajit Rana poisoned the ears of Rajendra Laxmi against Bahadur Shah. Rajendra Laxmi succeeded in the confinement of Prince Bahadur Shah with the help of her new minister Sarbajit Rana. Guru Gajraj Mishra came to rescue Bahadur Shah on the condition that Bahadur Shah should leave the country. Also, his rival Sriharsh Pant was branded outcast and expelled instead of execution which was prohibited for Brahmins.

Prince Bahadur Shah confined his sister-in-law Queen Rajendra Laxmi on the charge of having illicit relation with Sarbajit Rana Magar on 31 August 1778. Subsequently, Sarbajit was executed inside the palace by Prince Bahadur Shah with the help of male servants of the royal palace. Historian Bhadra Ratna Bajracharya asserts that it was actually Chautariya Daljit Shah who led the opposing group against Sarbajit Rana Magar and Rajendra Laxmi. The letter dated B.S. 1835 Bhadra Sudi 11 Roj 4 (1778 A.D.) to Narayan Malla and Vrajabasi Pande asserts the death of Sarbajit under misconduct and the appointment of Bahadur Shah as regent. The death of Sarbajit Rana Magar is considered to have marked the initiation of court conspiracies and massacres in the newly unified Kingdom of Nepal. Historian Baburam Acharya points that the sanctions against Queen Rajendra Laxmi under moral misconduct was a mistake of Bahadur Shah. Similarly, the murder of Sarbajit Rana Magar was condemned by many historians as an act of injustice.

Vamsharaj Pande, once Dewan of Nepal and son of the popular commander Kalu Pande, was beheaded on the conspiracy of Queen Rajendra Laxmi with his support. In the special tribunal meeting at Bhandarkhal garden, east of Kathmandu Durbar, Swaroop Singh held Vamsharaj liable for letting the King of Parbat, Kirtibam Malla to run away in the battle a year ago. He had a fiery conversation with Vamsharaj before Vamsharaj was declared guilty and was subsequently executed by beheading on the tribunal. Historian Rishikesh Shah and Ganga Karmacharya claim that he was executed in March 1785. Bhadra Ratna Bajracharya and Tulsi Ram Vaidya claim that he was executed on 21 April 1785. On 2 July 1785, his stiff opponent Prince Regent Bahadur Shah of Nepal was arrested and on the eleventh day of imprisonment on 13 July, his only supporter Queen Rajendra Laxmi died. Then onwards, Bahadur Shah took over the regency of his nephew King Rana Bahadur Shah and on the first moments of his regency ordered Swaroop Singh who was in Pokhara to be beheaded there on the charges of treason. He had gone to Kaski to join Daljit Shah's military campaign of Kaski fearing retaliation of the old courtiers due to his conspiracy against Vamsharaj. He was executed on 24th Shrawan 1842 B.S.

== Tibetan conflict ==
After the death of Prithvi Narayan Shah, the Shah dynasty began to expand their kingdom into what is present day North India. Between 1788 and 1791, Nepal invaded Tibet and robbed the Tashi Lhunpo Monastery in Shigatse. Tibet sought help from the Chinese imperial court and the Qianlong Emperor of the Chinese Qing dynasty appointed Fuk'anggan commander-in-chief of the Tibetan campaign. Heavy damages were inflicted on both sides. The Nepali forces retreated step by step back to Nuwakot to stretch Sino-Tibetan forces uncomfortably. The Chinese launched uphill attack during the daylight and failed to succeed due to strong counterattack with Khukuri at Nuwakot. The Chinese army suffered a major setback when they tried to cross a monsoon-flooded Betrawati, close to the Gorkhali palace in Nuwakot. A stalemate ensued when Fuk'anggan was keen to protect his troops and wanted to negotiate at Nuwakot. The treaty was more favorable to the Chinese side and prescribed that Nepal had to pay tributes to the Chinese emperor.

== Timeline of unification ==
The timeline of unification is given in the following table.

Date	Date in BS	Description
1742	1799	Prithvi Narayan Shah (PNS) becomes King of Gorkha after death of his father
1742	1800	First battle of Nuwakot. PNS loses the battle.
1743	1801	PNS brings weapons from Benaras and trains army
1743	1801	Unification starts
1744	1801	Second battle of Nuwakot. It is annexed but returned to Kathmandu in 1745.
1754	1811	Dolakha, Sindhupalchowk, Dahachowk and Naldum annexed.
1757	1814	First battle of Kritipur. PNS loses the battle. Kalu Pande dies.
1758	1815	Gorkha makes peace treaty with Kathmandu
1759	1816	Captures Shivapuri
1761	1818	Chaule and Kahule is captured
1762	1819	Makwanpur annexed, Sindhuli annexed
1763	1820	Pharping, Bisankhu, Dhulikhel, Banepa, Sanga, Ranikot, Nala, Parevakot and Kavilaspur annexed
1764	1821	Second battle of Kritipur.
1765	1822	Balaju, Lutikot annexed
1766	1823	Kritipur captured, Salimpa annexed.
1767	1824	Gurkha soldiers defeat British soldiers at Sindhuli who came to help king of Kathmandu
1768	1825	British India takes possession of Bara, Parsa and Hilwal
1768	1825	Gorkha repossess the territory. Annexes Bettia.
1768	1825	Kathmandu, Patan is annexed
1769	1826	Bhatgaun is annexed
1769	1826	Kathmandu is declared as the capital
1771	1828	Kaski and Sapta gandaki region are annexed
1771	1828	Manpang, Chang, Darhung, Manmul, Ranrung, Jyamire, Grihakot, Kyangmi, Bhirkot, Garahu, Painyu, Dhuvakot were annexed.
1773	1830	Rava, Cisankhu, Dingla was annexed
1774	1831	Majuva, Kalum, Mahadinga Pauva is annexed
1774	1831	Chainpur, Vijaypur, area up to Tista river annexed
1775	1832	PNS dies. Pratap Singh Shah became King. Rajendra Laxmi takes the incharge of unification.
1782	1840	1839 BS. Lamjung and Tanahu is annexed.
1785	1843	Rajendra Laxmi dies in 1842 BS. Bahadhur Shah takes incharge of unification.
1786	1844	Bheri ara is annexed
1789	1847	Jumla is annexed
1790	1848	Doti, Kumaun and Srinagar, Garwal, Hindur, Besahr, Chamba 12 and 18 Thakurai (currently India) is annexed (1847 BS)
1792	1850	Nepal–Sino war starts
1814	1872	British India captures Butwal. But Gurkha army takes control the next month. This causes Nepal–Anglo war. Kumaun and Gadwal comes in control of British India. (1814)
1815	1873	Sugauli Treaty is signed
1860	1918	Janga Bahdhur becomes successful to return part of Terai to Nepal (Naya Muluk) from British India

== See also ==
- History of Nepal
