= Dhokal Singh Basnyat =

Top administrator in Nepal

Kazi Dhokal Singh Basnyat

Personal details
- Parent: Shivaram Singh Basnyat (father)

Military service
- Battles/wars: Unification of Nepal

Dhokal Singh Basnyat served as the governor of the Kumaon and Garhwal kingdoms. He was the youngest son of Senapati Shivaram Singh Basnyat and the first owner of Narayanhiti Palace.
