= Naahar Singh Basnyat =

Soldier who fought against the forces of Mir Qasim

Kazi Naahar Singh Basnyat

Kazi (Nepal)
- In office TBD–TBD
- Preceded by: TBD
- Succeeded by: TBD

Personal details
- Parents: Shivaram Singh Basnyat (father); Shuraprabha Thapa (mother)

Military service
- Battles/wars: Unification of Nepal

Naahar Singh Basnyat was a soldier who fought against the forces of Mir Qasim. He was the eldest son of Shivaram Singh Basnyat. He fought against the Kings of Kathmandu valley. He fought against Tibet in 1845 B.S.
