= Gajraj Mishra =

Royal priest in Nepal

Raj guru gajraj Mishra Gajraj Mishra

Royal preceptor of Nepal and lawyers of Nepal to Patna and Signer of treaty
- In office Probably after 1775 – After 1817 AD
- Monarchs: Prithvi Narayan Shah; Pratap Singh Shah; Rana Bahadur Shah; Girvan Yuddha Bikram Shah Rajendra Bir Bikram Shah( probably since he could have died)
- Preceded by: kulnanda dhakal and banu joshi Aryal ( as royal preceptor) lawyer and signer( unknown)
- Succeeded by: Dinanath Upadhyay ( as lawyer) rangnath paudel ( as royal preceptor)

Personal details
- Born: Born before or after 1740
- Died: 1817 AD पटना
- Citizenship: Nepali
- Spouse: Unknown ( but had married)
- Relations: Unkwon
- Children: Unknown ( had child)
- Parents: Unkwon (father); Unkwon (mother)

Rajguru Gajraj Mishra (Nepali: गजराज मिश्र) also spelled Gajaraj Mishra was a Nepalese politician, ambassador, diplomat and a royal priest of Shah dynasty. He was always inclined to his disciple Prince Regent Bahadur Shah of Nepal. Gajraj Mishra was disfavoured by his disciple King Pratap Singh Shah due to his support to Prince Bahadur Shah. He was also disfavoured by Pratap Singh's son Rana Bahadur Shah.

== Life ==
=== Favourism to Bahadur Shah ===
King Prithvi Narayan Shah had appointed Pandit Gajraj Mishra as an attendant and permanent resident in Banaras to watch over the activities of the neighbouring countries. On January 1775, King Prithvi Narayan Shah died at Nuwakot. In order to prevent Prince Bahadur Shah from being a Chautariya(royal chief minister), Swarup Singh Karki marched with army to Nuwakot to confine Prince Bahadur who was then mourning the death of his father former King Prithvi Narayan Shah. Bahadur Shah was confined on the orders of newly crowned King Pratap Singh Shah. Guru Gajraj Mishra was a teacher of both King Pratap Singh and Prince Bahadur. On his visit to offer blessings to his disciple and newly crowned King Pratap Singh, he was disappointed with the confinement of his other disciple Prince Bahadur Shah. He requested to the King that instead of confinement, Prince Bahadur should be given a fresh life at exile.

On 1778 AD, Queen Rajendra Laxmi succeeded in the confinement of Prince Bahadur Shah with the help of her new minister Sarbajit Rana Magar. Guru Gajraj Mishra again came to rescue Bahadur Shah on the condition that Bahadur Shah should leave the country.

=== Treaty of Commerce and Alliance ===
During the tenure of Mulkaji Bakhtawar Singh Basnyat, on 28 October 1801, a Treaty of Commerce and Alliance was finally signed between Nepal and East India Company. The treaty was signed by Gajraj Mishra, on the behalf of Nepal Durbar, and Charles Crawford, on the behalf of East India Company, in Danapur, India. (Note: Among the articles in the treaty, it decided on perpetual peace and friendship between the two states, on the pension for Rana Bahadur Shah, the establishment of a British Residency in Kathmandu, and an establishment of trade relations between the two states.)

King Rana Bahadur wrote letters to his brothers Chautariya Sher Bahadur Shah and Chautariya Bidur Shahi from Banaras during his exile where he blatantly blamed that Gajraj Mishra and Damodar Pande planned to dethrone Girvan Yuddha Bikram Shah and make Chautariya Krishna Shah as the King of Nepal after the signing of the Treaty of Commerce and Alliance with British. (Note: Rana Bahadur Shah wrote the following letters: A letter to his brother, Chautariya Sher Bahadur Shah, in an attempt to win him over. He asked Chautariya Sher Bahadur Shah to look properly after King Girvan. The letters Rana Bahadur Shah wrote to Chautariya Sher Bahadur Shah also gave expression to brotherly affection, although it was Chautariya Sher Bahadur Shah himself who finally assassinated him. Rana Bahadur Shah also asked Chautariya Sher Bahadur Shah to make efforts to free him from detention. He wrote, Do whatever is possible so that the reign of (King Girvan) may be stable, the people who have come to Nepal from other countries may not be able to continue staying there and I may become free from detention and be able to come back to Nepal.Rana Bahadur Shah also wrote, The treaty is only a pretext to create a split between you and me and make Krishna Shah King. This is the reason why Gajaraj Mishra and Damodar Pande have joined hands. He thus warned Chautariya Sher Bahadur Shah that the Bhardars were hatching a conspiracy to banish King Girvan to Gorkha.; Rana Bahadur Shah wrote similar letters to Chautariya Bidur Shahi also.) He also manipulated Mulkaji (Prime Minister) Bakhtawar Singh Basnyat and members of the Council of Kajis against Guru Gajraj Mishra and ordered not to follow any of the Mishra's commandments. (Note: Rana Bahadur Shah wrote letters to a member of the Council of Kajis, Bakhtawar Singh Basnyat, a brother of the murdered Kaji Kirtiman Basnet. In these letters, Rana Bahadur Shah asked Bakhtawar Singh not only to make arrangements to free him from detention but also to beware of Gajraj Mishra, who had had the main hand in concluding the treaty with the British. He wrote, Gajaraj Mishra may try to win you over, or intimidate you, in our name as well as in that of our eldest queen. However, I have not sent him to Nepal. In fact, he has gone there in contravention of my order. Let nobody believe there that he has come there with my consent.)

=== Sugauli Treaty ===
The Treaty of Sugauli was signed by between British India and Kingdom of Nepal. The representatives for Nepal were Chandra Shekhar Upadhyaya and Pandit Gajraj Mishra.

== Books ==
- Amatya, Shaphalya (1978), "The failure of Captain Knox's mission in Nepal" (PDF), Ancient Nepal (46–48): 9–17
- Acharya, Baburam (2019). Acharya, Shrikrishna (ed.). Aba Yasto Kahilyai Nahos (in Nepali). Kathmandu: Fine Print Books. ISBN 978-9937-665-40-7.
- Acharya, Baburam (1 November 1975) [1966], "Some Confusions" (PDF), Regmi Research Series, 7 (11), Regmi Research Centre: 210–215
- Nepal, Gyanmani (2007), Nepal ko Mahabharat (in Nepali) (3rd ed.), Kathmandu: Sajha, p. 314, ISBN 9789993325857
- Nepali, Chittaranjan (1 May 1971) [1963], The Assassination of Rana Bahadur Shah (PDF), vol. 3, Kathmandu: Regmi Research Series, pp. 101–115
- Vaidya, T.R.; Vajracharya, B.R. (December 1990 – March 1991). "The Role of Swarup Singh Karki During The Second Half of the 18th century Nepal" (PDF). Ancient Nepal. 121–122. Department of Archaeology (Nepal).
- T.U. History Association (1977), Voice of History, vol. 3, Tribhuwan University History Association
