= 1806 Bhandarkhal massacre =

1806 Nepalese political massacre

Coordinates: 27.705582°N 85.306918°E

Bhandarkhal Massacre
- Location: Bhandarkhal Garden, Basantapur Durbar, Kathmandu and bank of Bishnumati River, Kathmandu, Nepal
- Date: Up to 2 weeks after 25 April 1806
- Attack type: political assassination (death penalties on accusation of high treason)
- Weapons: Talwar, Khunda, rifle, Khukuri
- Deaths: 93 people including Kaji Tribhuvan Khawas (Pradhan); Chautariya Bidur Shah; Kaji Narsingh Gurung; King Prithvi Pal Sen of Palpa
- Perpetrators: Bhimsen Thapa and faction; aides of Government of Nepal

The Bhandarkhal massacre (Nepali: भण्डारखाल पर्व) was a political massacre that occurred in Bhandarkhal garden of Hanuman Dhoka, Kathmandu, Nepal in 1806. The chief perpetrator of the massacre was then Kaji Bhimsen Thapa. Bhimsen instigated the massacre as investigation and trial upon the death of then reigning Mukhtiyar and former King Rana Bahadur Shah. It began when Tribhuvan Khawas (Pradhan), a member of Sher Bahadur's faction, was imprisoned on the re-opened charges of conspiracy with the British that led to Knox's mission and finally convicted with a death penalty on the charge of treason. After the implication, Tribhuvan decided to reveal everyone that was involved in the dialogue with the British on his house meeting on the night of 25 April 1806. The confession implicated Sher Bahadur Shah, Rana Bahadur's half brother and he began to harass his half brother. In desperation, Sher Bahadur killed Rana Bahadur and triggered the massacre which lasted for two weeks. The number of deaths occurred was ninety-three people (16 women and 77 men).

== Background ==
After returning to Kathmandu, in complicity with Rana Bahadur Shah, Bhimsen Thapa indulged in appropriating the palaces and properties of deposed members of Shah dynasty, (Note: Bhimsen Thapa blinded three Shah infants (Bir Bhadra Shah, Bhim Pratap Shah, Bhim Rudra Shah) who were heirs to Bagh Durbar, a palace with large garden and compound near Tundikhel, which he appropriated for himself. He also blinded another Shah infant (Kul Chandra Shah), who was an heir to a palace at Indra Chowk, which he gave to Ranganath Poudyal. The blinding of Shah infants was done to ensure that King Girvan Yuddha Bikram Shah's status would not be challenged by other Shah contenders for the throne, since according to the custom of that time, a physically disabled person was not allowed to be a king.) which he shared between himself and his supporter Ranganath Poudyal. This aroused resentment and jealousy among Sher Bahadur Shah (Rana Bahadur's step-brother) and his faction, since they did not receive any portion of this confiscated property, despite their help in reinstating Rana Bahadur to power. (Note: Sher Bahadur Shah had switched his allegiance at the crucial moment which had allowed Damodar Pande to be arrested at Thankot.) They were also wary of Bhimsen's growing power. By this time, Rana Bahadur was a nominal figure and Kaji Bhimsen Thapa was single-handedly controlling the central administration of the country, being able to implement even unpopular reforms like Baisathi Haran.

For almost two years after returning to Kathmandu, Rana Bahadur had no official position in the government – he was neither a king, nor a regent, nor a minister – yet he felt no qualms in using the full state power. Not only did Rana Bahadur carry out the Baisathi Haran under Bhimsen's advice, he was also able to banish all non-vaccinated children, as well as their parents, from the town during a smallpox outbreak, in order to prevent King Girvan from catching that disease. Now, after almost two-years, Rana Bahadur was suddenly made Mukhtiyar (chief authority) and Bhimsen tried to implement his schemes through Rana Bahadur. Bhimsen had also secretly learned of a plot to oust Rana Bahadur. Tribhuvan Khawas (Pradhan), a member of Sher Bahadur's faction, was imprisoned on the re-opened charges of conspiracy with the British that led to the Knox's mission, but for which pardon had already been doled out, and was ordered to be executed. Tribhuvan Khawas decided to reveal everyone that was involved in the dialogue with the British. Among those implicated was Sher Bahadur Shah.

== Night meeting at Khawas's house ==
On the night of 25 April 1806, Rana Bahadur held a meeting at Tribhuvan Khawas's house with rest of the courtiers, during which he taunted and threatened to execute Sher Bahadur. At around 10 pm, Sher Bahadur in desperation drew a sword and killed Rana Bahadur Shah before being cut down by nearby courtiers, Bam Shah and Bal Narsingh Kunwar, also allies of Bhimsen.

== Incident ==
The assassination of Rana Bahadur Shah triggered a great massacre in Bhandarkhal (a royal garden east of Kathmandu Durbar) and at the bank of Bishnumati river. That very night, members of Sher Bahadur's faction – Bidur Shah, Tribhuvan Khawas and Narsingh Gurung – and even King Prithvipal Sen of Palpa, who was under house arrest in Patan Durbar, were swiftly rounded up and killed in Bhandarkhal. Their dead bodies were not allowed funeral rites and were dragged and thrown by the banks of Bishnumati to be eaten by vultures and jackals. The next few days, all the sons of Sher Bahadur Shah, Bidur Shah, Tribhuvan Khawas and Narsingh Gurung, aged 2 to 15 were beheaded by the bank of Bishnumati; their wives and daughters were given to the untouchables, their bodyguards and servants were also put to death, and all their property seized. Bhimsen managed to kill everyone who did not agree with him or anyone who could potentially become a problem for him in the future. In this massacre that lasted for about two weeks, a total of ninety-three people (16 women and 77 men) lost their lives.

== Aftermath ==
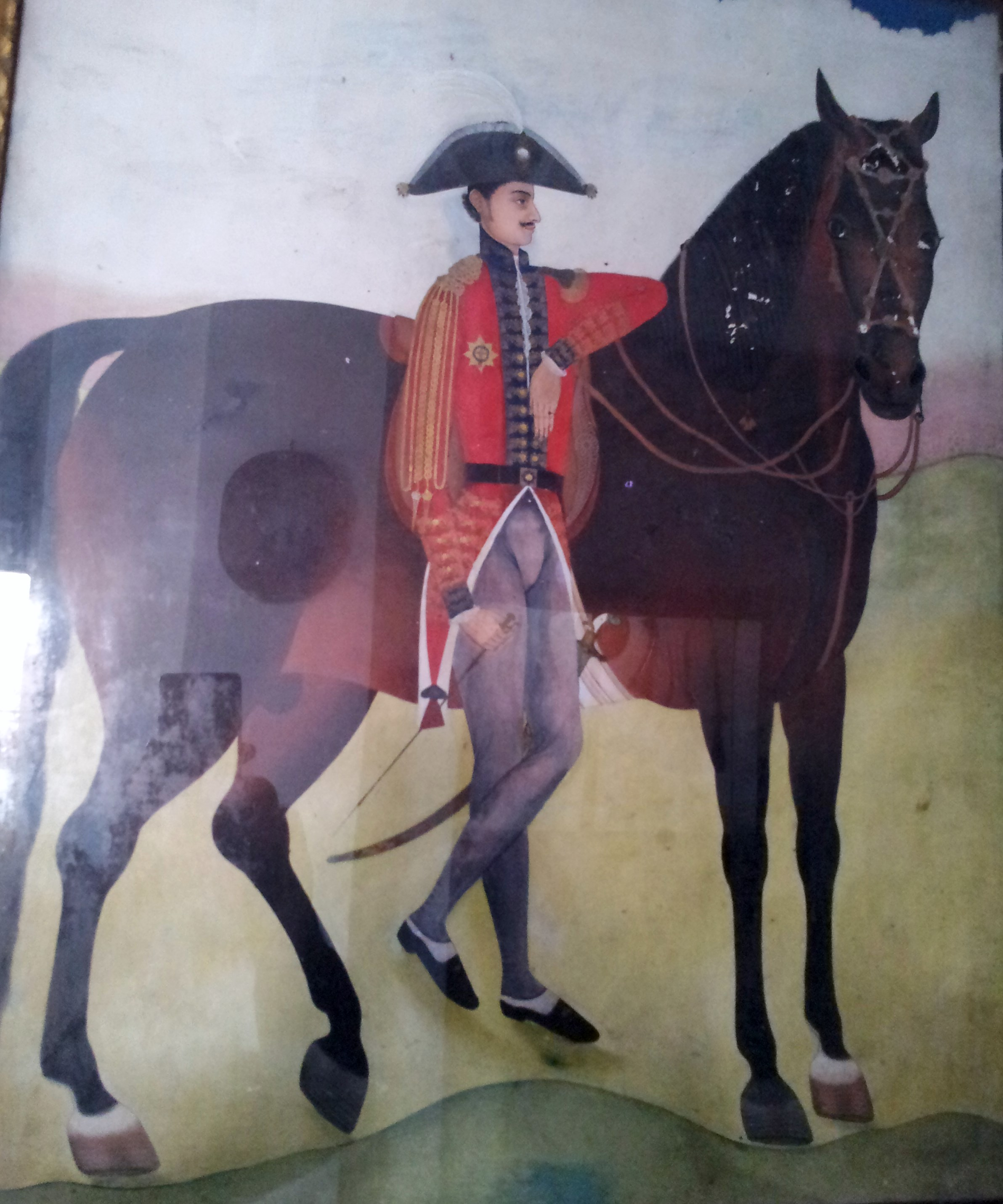
Picture of Bhimsen Thapa standing beside a horse in the Nepalese military uniforms

Almost one and half months before the massacre, upon Bhimsen's insistence, Rana Bahadur, then 31 years old, had married a 14-year-old girl named Tripurasundari on 7 March 1806, making her his fifth legitimate wife. (Note: While it is generally believed that Tripurasundari was from a Thapa family, Baburam Acharya further conjectured that Tripurasundari was possibly the daughter of Bhimsen's brother Nain Singh Thapa.) Taking advantage of the political chaos, Bhimsen became the Mukhtiyar (1806–37), and Tripurasundari was given the title Lalita Tripurasundari and declared regent and Queen Mother (1806–32) of Girvan Yuddha Bikram Shah, who was himself 9 years old. Thus, Bhimsen became the first person outside the royal household to hold the position of the Mukhtiyar. All the other wives (except Subarnaprabha) and concubines of Rana Bahadur, along with their handmaidens, were forced to commit sati. Bhimsen obtained a royal mandate from Tripurasundari, given in the name of King Girvan, commanding all other courtiers to be obedient to him. Bhimsen further consolidated his power by disenfranchising the old courtiers from the central power by placing them as administrators of far-flung provinces of the country. The courtiers were instead replaced by his close relatives, who were mere yes-men. On the spot where Rana Bahadur Shah drew his last breath, Bhimsen later built a commemorative Shiva temple by the name Rana-Mukteshwar.

== See also ==
- List of massacres in Nepal

== Sources ==
- Acharya, Baburam (2012), Acharya, Shri Krishna (ed.), Janaral Bhimsen Thapa : Yinko Utthan Tatha Pattan (in Nepali), Kathmandu: Education Book House, p. 228, ISBN 9789937241748
- Karmacharya, Ganga (2005), Queens in Nepalese politics: an account of roles of Nepalese queens in state affairs, 1775–1846, Kathmandu: Educational Pub. House, p. 185, ISBN 9789994633937
- Nepal, Gyanmani (2007), Nepal ko Mahabharat (in Nepali) (3rd ed.), Kathmandu: Sajha, p. 314, ISBN 9789993325857
- Pradhan, Kumar L. (2012), Thapa Politics in Nepal: With Special Reference to Bhim Sen Thapa, 1806–1839, New Delhi: Concept Publishing Company, p. 278, ISBN 9788180698132
