= Swarup Singh Karki =

Top administrator in Nepal

Sri Dewan Sahib Swarup Singh Karki

Dewan of Nepal
- In office c. 1775 – c. 1777
- Preceded by: Vamsharaj Pande
- Succeeded by: Sarbajit Rana Magar

Personal details
- Born: 1751 A.D. Chaudandi, Nepal
- Died: August, 1785 A.D. Pokhara, Nepal
- Relatives: Vakil Roopnarayan Karki (brother)

Military service
- Rank: Kaji
- Battles/wars: Battle of Bhaktapur, Other battles of Unification of Nepal

Swarup Singh Karki (Nepali: स्वरूप सिंह कार्की) or Swaroop Singh Karki, was a Nepali politician, courtier, military commander and minister. He was popular for his singing prowess and court conspiracies. He was selected as Dewan (prime minister) in the reign of King Pratap Singh Shah and a significant politician in the regent rule of Queen Rajendra of Nepal. He was one of the most influential court politician in the rule of King Pratap Singh and Queen Rajendralaxmi, others being his rival Bahadur Shah of Nepal and Vamsharaj Pande. Vamsharaj was his perceived career rival. His life and career ended when Prince Bahadur Shah was appointed as regent in 1785.

== Early life ==
He was born in 1808 B.S. He belonged to Chaudandi state of Sen Kings in the Eastern Nepal. He was Chhetri Mudula(Karki (surname)) by ethnicity and was employed under King Karna Sen of Chaudandi. He later took asylum under Prithvi Narayan Shah after the conquest of Kathmandu and Patan by Gorkha due to disagreement with the Kirati chief. He was appointed as Sardar by the King Prithvi Narayan Shah on the recommendation of Crown Prince Pratap Singh Shah and was sent to the Battle of Bhaktapur in 1769 A.D. He was known as a good singer who often persuaded then Crown Prince Pratap Singh Shah and sidelined with non-Gorkhali courtiers such as Pandit Vrajnath Poudyal of Syangja Rising and Crown Prince's Newar concubine Maiju Rani in the Tantric practices of the Crown Prince. Tribhuwan University History Association and Instruction Committee also asserts Kaji Parashuram Thapa in the group headed by Brajnath and Swarup. The non-Gorkhali group remained in Kathmandu for running administration and old hereditary courtiers from Tharghars remained at Nuwakot for military conquests with King Prithvi Narayan Shah. The traditional Tharghar (Gorkhali nobility) courtiers favored Prince Bahadur Shah over Pratap Singh Shah.

== Court politics and military career ==
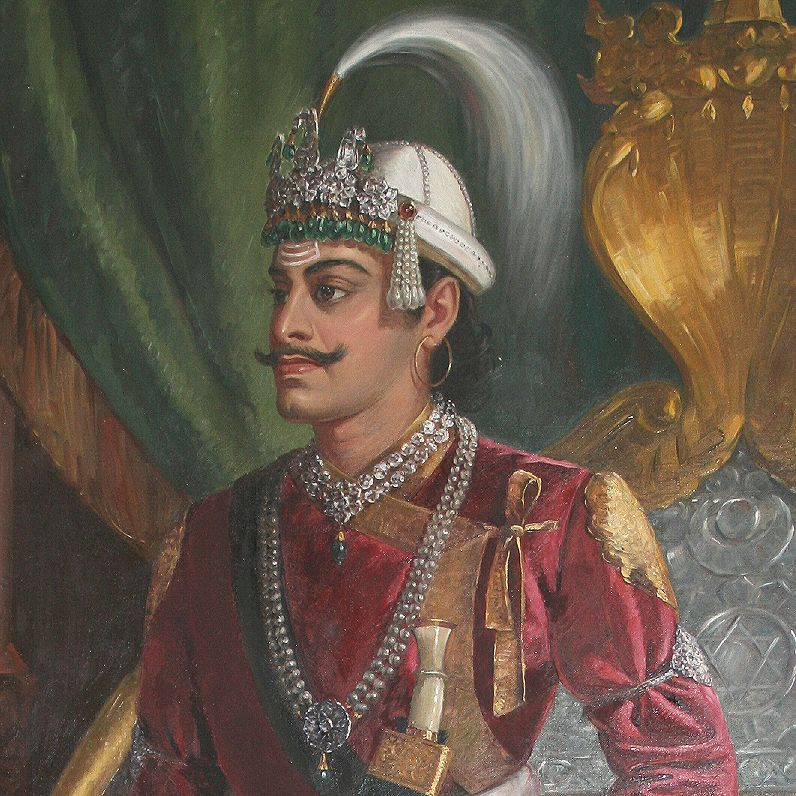
Pratap Singh Shah, King of Nepal (1775-1777); Swarup rose to prominence gaining his confidence

When Crown Prince Pratap Singh Shah ascended the throne in January 1775, Swarup and his group became the most influential persons in the court. In order to prevent Prince Bahadur Shah from being a Chautariya(royal chief minister), Swarup marched with army to Nuwakot to confine Prince Bahadur who was then mourning the death of his father former King Prithvi Narayan Shah. He confined Bahadur Shah and Prince Dal Mardan Shah with consent from newly reigning King Pratap Singh Shah who was considered to have no distinction of right and wrong. In the annual Pajani (renewal) of that year, Swarup Singh was promoted to the position of Kaji along with Abhiman Singh Basnyat, Amar Singh Thapa and Parashuram Thapa. In Falgun 1832 B.S., he succeeded in exiling Bahadur Shah, Dal Mardan Shah and Guru Gajraj Mishra on three heinous charges. The reign of King Pratap Singh was characterized by the constant rivalry between Swarup and Vamsharaj Pande, a member of the leading Pande family of Gorkha. The document dated Bikram Samvat 1833 Bhadra Vadi 3 Roj 6 (i.e. Friday 2 August 1776), shows that he had carried the title of Dewan along with Vamsharaj Pande.

He led the Nepali/Nepalese army to an attack on Bhubaneshwar and Kabilas area in the Saptari region and successfully conquered those places. The deposed When the senior courtier Abhiman Singh Basnyat conquered Someshwar in Chitwan, Swarup, in order to get credit, reached there after the success. This angered Abhiman Singh and Vamsharaj Pande, son of former Kaji of Gorkha Kalu Pande, who reported the plot to King Pratap Singh. He was exiled on that ground from the Kingdom of Nepal on 1834 B.S. It was also the last moments of reign of King Pratap in 1777 A.D. After he was expelled by King Pratap, he fled to Palpa and took side with the Sen Kings of Palpa, his native state Chaudandi, and King of Parbat. He was then considered a fugitive and rebel in the Kingdom of Nepal. Chaudandi King Karna Sen's widow had adopted the son of Palpa King Mukunda Sen, Prince Dhwajbir Sen through the consignment of Swaroop. Swaroop Singh was assigned to take Prince Dhwajbir to Calcutta to summon British military support against expanding Kingdom of Nepal.

Chaubisi confederacy attacked Gorkha Kingdom on Sirhanchowk Gadhi (fort) at north and established their own position on 2 January 1782 A.D. Commander Garud Dhoj Pant of Tanahun Kingdom launched attack on Gorkhali side with combined army of Lamjung and Parbat and also included soldiers from Kaski, Palpa, and Pyuthan. Queen Rajendra Lakshmi Devi wanted ultimate destruction of trade route of Lamjung. Thus, Swaroop Singh and his rival Vamsharaj was called back from their exile in Bettiah to launch an attack on the Lamjung Kingdom. His entrance in the royal court of Nepal was opposed by courtiers. Later, a reconciliation was done with him and Vamsharaj. Swarup appointed Daljit Shah as Chautariya in 1841 B.S. and took the support of Kaji Bhim Khawas.

== Vamsharaj conspiracy and death ==
Vamsharaj Pande was beheaded on the conspiracy of Queen Rajendra Laxmi with his support. In the special tribunal meeting at Bhandarkhal garden, east of Kathmandu Durbar, Swaroop Singh held Vamsharaj liable for letting the King of Parbat, Kirtibam Malla, escape from the battle a year ago. He had a fiery conversation with Vamsharaj before Vamsharaj was declared guilty and was subsequently executed by beheading. Historian Rishikesh Shah and Ganga Karmacharya claim that he was executed on March 1785. Bhadra Ratna Bajracharya and Tulsi Ram Vaidya claim that he was executed on 21 April 1785. On 2 July 1785, his stiff opponent Prince Regent Bahadur Shah of Nepal was arrested and on the eleventh day of imprisonment on 13 July, his only supporter Queen Rajendra Laxmi died. Then onwards, Bahadur Shah took over the regency of his nephew King Rana Bahadur Shah and in the first moments of his regency ordered Swaroop Singh who was in Pokhara to be beheaded there on the charges of treason. He had gone to Kaski to join Daljit Shah's military campaign of Kaski fearing retaliation of the old courtiers due to his conspiracy against Vamsharaj. He was executed on 24th Shrawan 1842 B.S.
