= Narsingh Gurung =

Nepalese noble and diplomat (died 1806)

- नरसिंह गुरुङ

Personal details
- Born: Syangja, Nepal
- Died: 26 April 1806 Kathmandu Durbar Square
- Spouse: Padmawatee Gurung
- Relations: Brother Jakhesingh Gurung

Narsingh Gurung (Nepali: नरसिंह गुरुङ) was Nepalese Kaji under King Rana Bahadur Shah. He is best known for his mission to Imperial China.

In 1785, he was appointed a tax Officer by Queen Regent Rajendra Laxmi Devi.

In 1786, He was promoted to 'Taksari' (a higher-ranking Tax Officer). Listee, Syaprung, Tibute and Bhot areas were under his command.

In 1789, Tibet did not want to pay taxes due to Nepal Government, subsequently, Nepal attacked Tibet in July 1791 and Narsingh Gurung was part of the attacking force in Digarcha. He also played a vital role to conclude a treaty. He was awarded land and money from Bahdur Shah.

In 1789, Gurung was sent to China to discuss the terms of the Treaty of Betrawati

In 1793, Gurung was promoted to Subedar for his services.

In 1794, King Rana Bahdur Shah appointed Narsingh Gurung to Kaji (Minister) in his cabinet.

In August 1795, he led 45 strong diplomats to China and was awarded 2nd Highest ranking Toga of China, a Crown decorated by peacock feathers by the Emperor Qianlong of China.

In 1798, Ran Bahadur abdicated and went to Kashi and 2nd Queen became Regent of King Girbanyudda Bikram. Queen Subarnaprabha appointed him 4th highest ranking Kaji in her cabinet.

In 1802, 1st Queen Rajrajeshwari returned from Kashi and assumed the role of Regent and appointed him as a Kaji with 4th highest rank in the cabinet again.

In 1803, Ran Bahadur Shah returned from Kashi and appointed himself as Mulkaji(Mukhtiyar) and regent and made Narsing Gurung Kaji again.

On 25 April 1806, Ran Bahadur Shah was assassinated by his half-brother Sher Bahadur Shah. Sher Bahadur Shah was also killed by Balnarsing Kunwor. Gurung was arrested along with Kaji Tribhuwan Khawas and King of Palpa King Prthvipal Sen. They were all massacred next day (26 April 1806) along with family members by Bhimsen Thapa and his team and were thrown to the bank of Bishnumati river. Kaji Narsingh Gurung was married to Padmaawatee Gurung, and they had three sons Shilarajsingh, Bhupalsingh and Ratnabhupasingh and two daughters Satyadevee and Menadevee. His sons were beheaded next day, and wife and daughters were given to the lower cast households. This massacre is known as Bhandarkhal Massacre. Death toll was 93 known. The only surviving male member of his family was his brother Jakhesingh Tutlem Gurung, who fled to Thana Parbat and laid low.

In 1789, Gurung was sent to China to discuss the terms of the Treaty of Betrawati (Sino-Nepalese War).

In 1795, Gurung was awarded red Tog (crown) of the second rank and plume of peacock feathers by the Chinese emperor.

Gurung was killed in the Bhandarkhal massacre in April 1806 which was led by future Mukhtiyar (equivalent to prime minister) Bhimsen Thapa.
