= Bidur Bahadur Shah =

Nepalese noble

- विदुरबहादुर शाह

Chautaria
- Monarch: Rana Bahadur Shah

Personal details
- Born: Hanuman Dhoka Palace, Kingdom of Nepal
- Died: 25 April 1806; Basantapur, Kingdom of Nepal
- Manner of death: Assassination
- Citizenship: Nepali
- Parents: Pratap Singh Shah (father); Maiju Rani Maneshvari Devi (mother)

Bidur Bahadur Shah (Nepali: विदुरबहादुर शाह; better known as Bidur Shah; died 1806) was a Nepalese noble who served as Chautaria under the reign of Rana Bahadur Shah.

== Biography ==
Bidur Bahadur Shah was born at Hanuman Dhoka to King Pratap Singh Shah and Maiju Rani Maneshvari Devi. His mother was from a Newar family and the concubine of the king.

Shah was promoted to Chautaria by Rana Bahadur Shah with his brother Sher Bahadur Shah.

Shah had maintained close contact with the future Mukhtiyar (equivalent to prime minister) Bhimsen Thapa.

Bidur Bahadur Shah was assassinated on 25 April 1806.
