= Queen Narendra of Nepal =

Narendra
- Queen consort of Gorkha; Queen consort of Nepal
- Died: 11 January 1775; Devighat, Nepal
- Spouse: Prithvi Narayan Shah
- Issue: Pratap Singh Shah; Vedum Shah; Bahadur Shah
Names
- Narendra Rajya Lakshmi Devi
- Dynasty: House of Shah (by marriage)
- Father: Abhiman Singh
- Religion: Hinduism

Narendra Rajya Lakshmi Devi (?–11 January 1775) was queen consort to Prithvi Narayan Shah, king of the Kingdom of Nepal. She was the mother of future King Pratap Singh Shah and Princes Vedum Shah and Bahadur Shah. She was the daughter of Abhiman Singh, a Rajput chief from Varanasi.

She committed sati on the same day that her husband Prithvi Narayan's final rites were conducted.

Royal titles
Preceded by Position established	Queen consort of Nepal; 1768–1775	Succeeded by Rajendra
