= Sino-Nepalese War =

Invasion of Tibet by Nepalese Army and Chinese military intervention

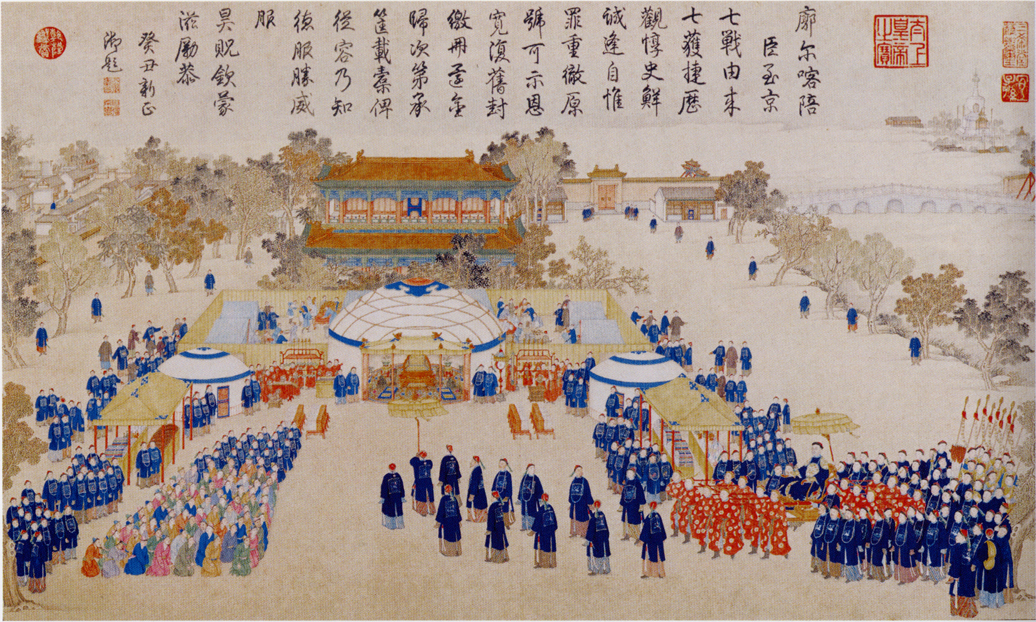
- Qing celebration at Ziguangge following the consolidation of Qing rule in Tibet after the Gurkha Campaign
Date	1788 – 20 October 1792
Location	Nepal; Tibet; Sikkim
Result	Peace Treaty; Treaty of Betrawati
Territorial changes	Neither side annexed territory from the other. Nepalese forces were driven out of Tibet and pushed back into Nepal, after which Nepal accepted tributary obligations to the Qing Empire, while Qing forces withdrew without permanently annexing Nepalese territory.

Belligerents
Qing Empire; Supported by: Tibet; Sikkim	Kingdom of Nepal

Commanders and leaders
Qianlong Emperor; Fuk'anggan; Sun Shiyi; Hailanqa; Helin; 8th Dalai Lama; Hor Khang Phuntso Choidrup (Note: Tibetan minister (Kalön) who mobilized Tibetan forces (around 10,000 troops) to assist Qing operations.); Rdo-ring Bstan-'dzin dpal-'byor (Note: also known as Doring Kaji, a senior Tibetan minister (Kalön) captured by Nepalese forces during the raid on Tashi Lhunpo Monastery in Shigatse); Tenzing Namgyal	King Rana; Regent Bahadur; Damodar Pande; Abhiman Basnyat; Kirtiman Basnyat

Strength
15,000	8,000

The Sino-Nepalese War was a war fought between the Qing dynasty of China and the Kingdom of Nepal in the late 18th century. It originated from a long-standing trade dispute over debased silver currency minted by Nepal for Tibet, in return for which Tibet started sending low-quality halite, leading to a Nepalese invasion of Tibet (then a Qing protectorate) in 1788. Under the leadership of Regent Bahadur Shah, Nepalese forces occupied large territories in Tibet and forced Tibetan authorities to sign the Treaty of Kerung (1789), under which Tibet agreed to pay annual tribute of 50,001 Nepalese silver coins (mahendramalli) to the Kingdom of Nepal.

However, Tibet stopped paying tribute. After failing to receive the annual payment, Nepal declared a second war on Tibet in 1791. Following the Gorkha invasion of Tibet and the plundering of several major Tibetan monasteries, the Tibetan government appealed for Qing military intervention, prompting the dispatch of a large Qing expeditionary army under General Fuk'anggan, which drove Gorkha forces out of Tibetan territory and pursued them into Nepal, where Qing forces advanced as far as the Betrawati River, approximately a day's journey from Kathmandu, and occupied areas in the northern Kathmandu Valley. Following the campaign, the Qing forces relinquished their territorial acquisitions and chose to incorporate Nepal into the Qing tributary system of diplomacy rather than annexing it, establishing a Qing-centred framework for Nepal's relations with Tibet and the imperial court. Under the postwar settlement, the Gorkhas undertook to return some of the goods plundered from Tashilhunpo and dispatch a tributary mission to Beijing every five years, while disputes between Nepal and Tibet were to be referred to the Qing amban in Lhasa, Nepal relinquished its territorial claims over two border passes, and China assumed the determining role in Nepal–Tibet boundary arrangements. Historian Ulrich Theobald identifies the postwar arrangement as the assertion of Nepal's status as a tributary state within the Qing imperial system, explaining that, from the Qing perspective, Nepal had thereby accepted Qing suzerainty. The relationship acquired an enduring diplomatic dimension, with Nepal sending seventeen missions to the Qing emperor in Beijing between 1792 and 1910, while the Qing ambans in Lhasa became central intermediaries in relations between China, Nepal and Tibet. Historian Vijay Gokhale characterises the resulting geopolitical transformation as China's emergence "as the dominant power to the immediate north of the Himalayan watershed", while noting its attempt to reduce Nepal's status to that of a tributary state. Nepal occupied a subordinate position within the Qing imperial tributary hierarchy, acknowledging the Chinese emperor's superior status through tributary obligations and diplomatic deference, as a contemporary account described the Gorkha ruler as "a faithful tributary of the Chinese Government, and refers himself to it whenever occasion requires." Nepal's subordinate diplomatic standing was further reflected in its submissive correspondence with Qing authorities, as an 1876 report concerning a Nepalese petition received by the Chinese Resident at Lhasa described its language as "reverentially submissive, and expressive of the most devoted loyalty."

== Names ==
The war is also known as the Sino-Gorkha War or the Campaigns against the Gurkhas (Chinese: 廓爾喀之役).

== Background ==
Tibet had been using Nepalese silver coins since the time of the Malla kings. When Prithvi Narayan Shah of the Gorkha Kingdom launched an economic blockade on the Kathmandu Valley during his unification campaign, Jaya Prakash Malla of Kathmandu faced an economic crisis which he tried to alleviate by minting low quality coins mixed with copper. After Prithvi Narayan Shah successfully conquered the Kathmandu Valley in 1769 and firmly established the rule of the Shah dynasty in Nepal, he reverted to minting pure silver coins. But by then the damage to the confidence of the Nepalese minted coins had already been done. The Tibetans demanded that all the impure coins in circulation be replaced by pure silver ones, a demand that would place a huge financial burden on the newly founded Shah dynasty. Prithvi Narayan Shah was not willing to bear such a huge loss in a matter for which he was not responsible, but was willing to vouch for the purity of the newly minted coins. Thus two kinds of coins were in circulation in the market. The case remained unresolved due to his demise in 1775, and the problem was inherited by successive rulers of Nepal.

By 1788, Bahadur Shah, the youngest son of Prithivi Narayan Shah, and the uncle and regent of the minor king Rana Bahadur Shah, had inherited an aggravated coinage problem. On the plea of debased coins, Tibet had started to spread rumors that it was in a position to attack Nepal; and the Nepalese merchants in Tibet were likewise harassed. Another sore point in the Nepal-Tibet relationship was Nepal's decision to provide refuge to the 10th Shamarpa Lama, Mipam Chödrup Gyamtso, and his fourteen Tibetan followers. He had fled from Tibet to Nepal on religious and political grounds. Yet another cause for conflict was the low quality of salt being provided by Tibetans to Nepal, since in those days, all the salt in Nepal came from Tibet. A Nepalese delegation was sent to Tibet to resolve these issues, but the demands made by the Nepalese were rejected by the Tibetans. The Nepalese found the quarrel over coinage a good pretext to expand their kingdom and to raid the rich monasteries in Tibet. Thus, Nepal launched multi-directional attacks on Tibet.

== First Invasion ==
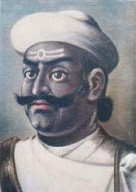
Kazi Damodar Pande, who led war with Tibetans that resulted in the Treaty of Kerung

In the year 1788, Bahadur Shah sent Gorkha troops under the joint command of Damodar Pande and Bam Shah to attack Tibet. The Gorkha troops entered Tibet through Kuti (Nyalam Town) and reached as far as Tashilhunpo (about 410 km. from Kuti). A fierce battle was fought at Shikarjong in which the Tibetans were badly defeated. The Panchen Lama and Sakya Lama then requested the Gorkha troops to have peace talks. So the Gorkha troops left Shikarjong and went towards Kuti and Kerung (Gyirong). (Note: Bam Shah, who co-commanded the invasion of Tibet in 1788, later served as the Nepali governor of the western territories. After the Treaty of Sugauli (1816), he claimed the villages of Chhangru, Tinkar, Kunti and Nabhi from the British, arguing that the western branch of the Kali River headwaters should be considered the main stream. The claim to Kunti and Nabhi was rejected by the Governor-General Lord Moira in September 1817.)

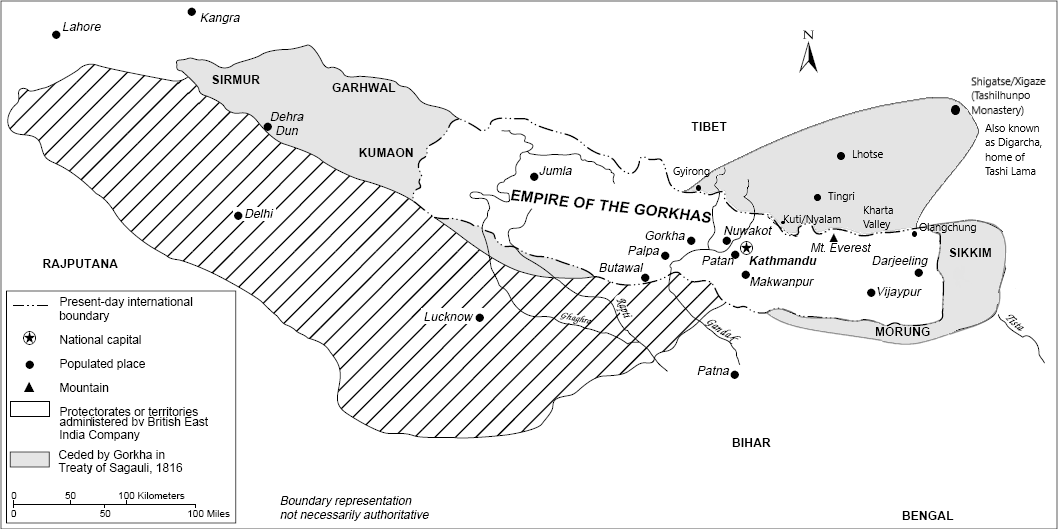
Territorial Expansions up to Shigatse/Digarcha

When the Qianlong Emperor of China heard the news of the invasion of Tibet by Nepal, he sent a large troop of the Chinese army under the command of General Chanchu. Chanchu came to know the situation from the Tibetan Lamas. He decided to stay in Tibet till the dispute was settled.

The representatives of Tibet and Nepal met at Khiru in 1789 to have peace talks. In the talks Tibet was held responsible for the quarrel and were required to give compensation to Nepal for the losses incurred in the war. Tibet had also to pay tribute to Nepal a sum of Rs. 50,001 every year in return for giving back to Tibet all the territories acquired during the war. It was called the Treaty of Kerung. The Nepalese representatives were given Rs. 50,000 as the first installment. So giving back the territories - Kerung, Kuti, Longa, Jhunga and Falak, they went back to Nepal. But Tibet refused to pay the tributes after the first year of the conclusion of the treaty. As a result, the war between Nepal and Tibet continued.

== Second Invasion ==
As Tibet had refused to pay the tribute to Nepal, Bahadur Shah sent a troop under Abhiman Singh Basnet to Kerung and another troop under the command of Damodar Pande to Kuti in 1791. Damodar Pande attacked Digarcha and captured the property of the monastery there. He also arrested the minister of Lhasa, Dhoren Kazi (Tib. Rdo ring Bstan 'dzin dpal 'byor, b.1760) and came back to Nepal. As soon as this news was heard by the Qianlong Emperor, he sent a strong troop of 10,000 soldiers (with a large proportion of Solon Ewenki soldiers) under the leadership of Fuk'anggan to defend Tibet. Fukanggan's forces reached Lhasa within sixty days, traversing nearly two thousand kilometres.

The Qing Empire asked Nepal to return the property to Tibet which was looted at Digarcha. They also demanded them to give back Shamarpa Lama who had taken asylum in Nepal. But Nepal turned a deaf ear to these demands. The Qing imperial army responded to Nepal with military intervention. The Qing forces marched along the banks of the Trishuli River until they almost reached Nuwakot but was combatted at Betravati. The Nepalese troops attempted to defend against the Qing attack, but were already faced with overwhelming odds. Heavy damage was inflicted on both sides and the Chinese army pushed the Gurkhas back to the inner hills close to the Nepali capital. However, a comprehensive defeat of the Gorkhali army could not be achieved.

At the same time, Nepal was dealing with military confrontations along two other fronts. The nation of Sikkim had begun incursions along Nepal's eastern border. Along the far-western side, the war with Garhwal continued. Within Nepal's own borders, the kingdoms of Achham, Doti and Jumla openly revolted. Thus the problems that Bahadur Shah faced made it much harder to defend against the Qing army. The anxious Bahadur Shah asked for ten artillery guns from the East India Company. Captain William Kirkpatrick arrived in Kathmandu, but he informed the Nepalese the conditions of business treaty which he required the signing of before delivery of the weapons. Wary of what signing the treaty would entail, the deal fell through and the military situation became critical for Bahadur Shah.

After a series of successful battles by Qing where the Ghorkalis lost more than four thousand men, the Qing army had finally suffered a major setback when they tried to cross a monsoon-flooded Betrawati, close to a Gorkhali palace in Nuwakot. As the Qing troops had reached south of the Betravati river, near Nuwakot, it was difficult for the Nepalese troops to wait for them at Kathmandu. At Kathmandu, a Nepalese force of less than 200 soldiers attempted to resist the Qing troops at Betravati. On September 19, 1792, Nepalese troops launched a counterattack against the Qing forces encamped at Jitpurfedi. The Nepalese used a tactic where their soldiers carried lit torches in their hands, tying them to the branches of trees, and tying flaming torches on the horns of domestic animals and driving them towards the enemy. The Qing army suffered a defeat, but the loss failed to dislodge them from Nepal.

A stalemate ensued, and with their resources low and a looming uncertainty regarding how long they would be able to hold on in addition to the need to continue their expansion drive on the western frontier, the Gorkhalis signed a treaty on terms dictated by the Qing that required, among other obligations, Nepal to send tributes to the Qing emperor every five years.

On the 8th day of Bhadra, 10,000 Chinese troops advanced forward from Betrawati river. There were three forts past the Betrawati river namely; Chokde, Dudethumko, and Gerkhu. At Gerkhu, the commanding officer was Kaji Kirtiman Singh Basnyat and at Chokde, the commanding officer was Kaji Damodar Pande. There were serious fightings around all the three forts and heavy repulse from Nepalese forces compelled Chinese troops to retreat to Betrawati river. At Betrawati bridge, the Chinese General Tung Thyang began to punish retreating Chinese soldiers with severe injuries resulting in their death. Two of the Chinese officers who retreated beyond the Betrawati river were punished with injury to their nose. The action of the Chinese General demotivated the troops and increase rapid desertion and retreat through other routes. Many Chinese troops died falling from hills into river and others from the bullets and arrows from Nepalese side. Around 1000 or 1200 Chinese troops were killed in the manner. The Chinese General Tung Thyang lost all hopes of attacking the Nepalese forces and decided to conclude a treaty with Nepal through his letter. The letter from Tung Thyang reached the government of Nepal. In reply, the government of Nepal issued a royal order deputing Kaji Damodar Pande to conclude a treaty with the Chinese Emperor to prevent further hostility and maintain peace with the Emperor. The royal order issued by King Rana Bahadur Shah to Kaji Damodar Pande on Thursday, Bhadra Sudi 13, 1849 (September 1792) is detailed below:

From King Rana Bahadur Shah,

To Damodar Pande.

Greetings. All is well here. We desire the same there. The news here is good. The Chinese Emperor is not insignificant. He is a great Emperor. We could have repulsed them with the blessing of (Goddess Shri Durga) when they came here this time. But it will not be good for the future to maintain hostility with the Emperor. He too desires to conclude a treaty, and that is what we too desire. Tung Thwang has sent a letter asking that one of the four Kajis be sent with letters and present to offer his respects to the Chinese Emperor. Kajis used to be sent formally to conclude treaties with Tanahu and Lamjung. We realize at present that it will not be proper for us not to depute a Kaji to the Emperor. When the matter was discussed with the other Kajis here, they said that Damdhar(Damodar) Pande, the recipient of Birta (land) grants and senior-most Kaji, should go. So you have to go. If there is any delay, (the interests) of the State will be harmed. You should therefore depart from there. So far as instructions are concerned, you are a Pande of our court. You are not ignorant of (matters) which will benefit the State and bring you credit. You know (such matters). In this respect, act according to your discretion. Submit a reply to this soon, within 1 ghadi (24 minutes) after you receive this royal order. Delay will be harmful.

Dated Thursday, Bhadra Sudi 13, 1849 (September 1792) at Kantipur.

== Aftermath ==
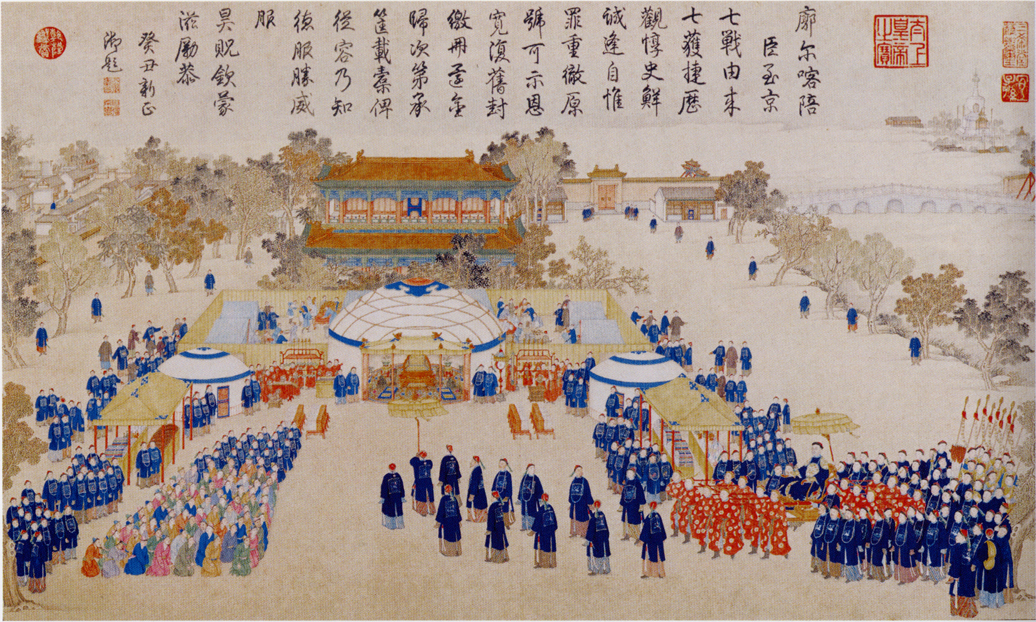
Qing celebration at Ziguangge following the consolidation of Qing rule in Tibet after the Gurkha Campaign, 1792.

The Sino-Nepalese War of 1791–1792 resulted in the emergence of Qing China as the dominant power immediately north of the Himalayan watershed, establishing its predominance in Nepalese–Tibetan affairs and strengthening its imperial authority in Tibet.

The postwar settlement at Betrawati in October 1792 established the framework for a formal relationship between Nepal and the Qing Empire. Although no authoritative text of the treaty is available in the public domain, accounts of its provisions describe a settlement that placed Nepalese–Tibetan disputes under the arbitration of the Qing amban in Lhasa, provided for the determination of the Nepal–Tibet boundary by China, and required Nepal to relinquish territorial claims over two border passes. The settlement also required Nepal to send a diplomatic mission to Beijing every five years, establishing a recurring tributary obligation within the Qing imperial diplomatic system.

The Qing imperial interpretation of the settlement regarded Nepal as a tributary state and treated the missions to Beijing as an acknowledgement of Qing suzerainty. Michaels and Xu similarly observe that Nepal retained its territorial integrity and sovereignty but lost its coinage privileges in Tibet and acknowledged Qing suzerainty through the quinquennial missions, albeit in a formal or ritualised manner. The missions continued over the following century, with Nepal sending seventeen missions to the Qing court between 1792 and 1910 according to Gokhale.

The war also led to a major reorganisation of Tibet's military and political administration under Qing supervision. In 1793, the status of the Qing ambans in Lhasa was elevated above that of the Tibetan council of ministers, the Kashag, giving the imperial representatives a leading role in Tibet's political affairs, particularly foreign policy. The military reforms extended to command structures, recruitment, training, armament and supply, marking a fundamental change in Tibetan military administration.

The settlement also altered Nepal's economic position in Tibet, particularly its former influence over the region's currency system. Before the conflict, Nepalese coins circulated widely in Tibet, where they served as an important medium of exchange in trans-Himalayan trade. The loss of Nepal's coinage privileges therefore represented a significant reduction in its economic influence in Tibet, alongside the political and diplomatic changes brought about by the settlement.

The Qing amban in Lhasa consequently became the principal intermediary in relations involving Nepal and Tibet, with authority to mediate and arbitrate disputes between them. This role persisted beyond the immediate postwar period, as the amban continued to act as mediator and final arbitrator in Nepalese–Tibetan disputes during 1856, 1873–1875, 1883–1885 and 1891–1898. Gokhale characterises this continuing intervention as an effort to maintain China's position as overlord in relation to Tibet and The Sino-Nepalese War of 1791–1792 resulted in the emergence of Qing China as the dominant power immediately north of the Himalayan watershed, establishing its predominance in Nepalese–Tibetan affairs and strengthening its imperial authority in Tibet.

Qing policy during the Anglo-Nepalese War of 1814–1816 further demonstrated that the dynasty's principal concern was the security of Tibet rather than the defence of Nepal. During the conflict, Nepal addressed several communications to the Qing emperor seeking military assistance, and the emperor instructed the amban in Lhasa to guard the Tibetan frontier but not to assist the Gorkhas. The instruction made clear that Qing military policy was directed towards preventing foreign interference in Tibet rather than providing Nepal with military protection.

The postwar order thus combined Nepal's continued territorial sovereignty with its formal acknowledgement of Qing suzerainty, the loss of its former coinage privileges in Tibet, and the establishment of Qing arbitration over Nepalese–Tibetan affairs. Through its strengthened political and military authority in Tibet, its control over the diplomatic framework governing Nepalese–Tibetan relations, and Nepal's recurring missions to Beijing, the Qing Empire established a durable position of regional predominance along the Himalayan frontier.

== Subsequent attitude ==
Later Prime Minister Bhimsen Thapa expressed his attitude on the Sino-Nepalese War in a letter to King Girvan Yuddha Bikram Shah. He wrote,

Through the influence of your good fortune, and that of your ancestors, no one has yet been able to cope with the state of Nepal. The Chinese once made war upon us, but were reduced to seek peace.

Subsequent diplomatic correspondence reflected Nepal's continued acknowledgement of the Qing emperor's superior position. In 1876, Sung Kwei, the acting Qing resident in Tibet, described a letter from the Nepalese king concerning the timing of the next tribute mission as:

couched in language reverentially submissive and expressive of the most devoted loyalty.

In a letter dated 20 July 1877 to the Qing emperor, King Surendra Bikram Shah stated:

My ancestors too have borne allegiance to and have remained under the shelter of His Imperial Majesty. I too with all my head and heart [...] beg to remain loyal and under the shelter of His Imperial Majesty.

=== Territorial losses and modern irredentism ===

The Gorkha state's territorial expansion reached its maximum extent in the period between the Sino-Nepalese War and the Anglo-Nepalese War (1814–16). At its peak, the state controlled territory from the Sutlej River in the west to the Teesta River in the east, and had invaded and briefly held Tibetan territory as far as Tashilhunpo, approximately 410 km inside Tibet.

The Treaty of Sugauli (1816) required Nepal to cede all territory west of the Kali River and east of the Mechi River to the East India Company.

Nepalese military ambitions in Tibet continued after the 1792 settlement. In March 1855, Jang Bahadur Rana dispatched a large force under General Ram Bahadur towards Kerung, while another Nepalese force marched towards Kuti, beginning the Nepal–Tibet War of 1855–1856. The Qing court was preoccupied with the Taiping Rebellion (1850–1864), creating an opportunity for Nepal to extend its territorial control over parts of southern Tibet. In August 1855, Jang Bahadur also demanded the withdrawal of the Qing Ambans and troops from Tibet, proposing that only a Nepalese representative remain at Lhasa, but the demand was rejected.

Despite subsequent military operations, Nepal faced successive defeats, supply difficulties and growing opposition to the continuation of the war. In January 1856, Jang Bahadur accepted a Tibetan peace proposal, having concluded that continuing the war would be too costly.

Qing representatives in Lhasa participated in the peace negotiations and the finalisation of the settlement. Nepal relinquished its demands for the cession of Kuti, Kerung, Tagla-kot and adjacent territories, while its demand for the withdrawal of the Qing Ambans and troops was also unsuccessful. The possibility of Chinese military intervention continued to constrain Nepal's conduct during the conflict.

The resulting Treaty of Thapathali, concluded on 24 March 1856, provided for Tibet to pay Nepal an annual sum of 10,000 rupees. It granted Nepalese merchants duty-free trade and other privileges, and established a Nepalese representative at Lhasa. The treaty also required Nepal to withdraw its troops from the occupied Tibetan territories, including Kerung and Kuti. The treaty reaffirmed Qing imperial suzerainty over the Nepal–Tibet relationship, with both states acknowledging their continued allegiance to the Emperor of China.

In the twentieth and twenty-first centuries, a Nepali irredentist movement known as Greater Nepal has demanded the return of territories ceded under the Treaty of Sugauli from India. The movement's intellectual leaders, notably former Survey Department director Buddhi Narayan Shrestha, have published maps of "Greater Nepal" extending from the Sutlej to the Teesta, and in the north to Shigatse and Tashilhunpo — territory that is now under Chinese control.

However, no Greater Nepal advocate has made territorial claims against China analogous to those made against India, despite the Gorkha state having invaded and controlled Tibetan territory during this war. The Greater Nepal movement's demands are directed exclusively at territories ceded to the British under the Treaty of Sugauli, which are now part of India.

== Gallery ==
Paintings and engravings from a series commissioned by the Qianlong emperor and depicting the "Gurkha Campaign":

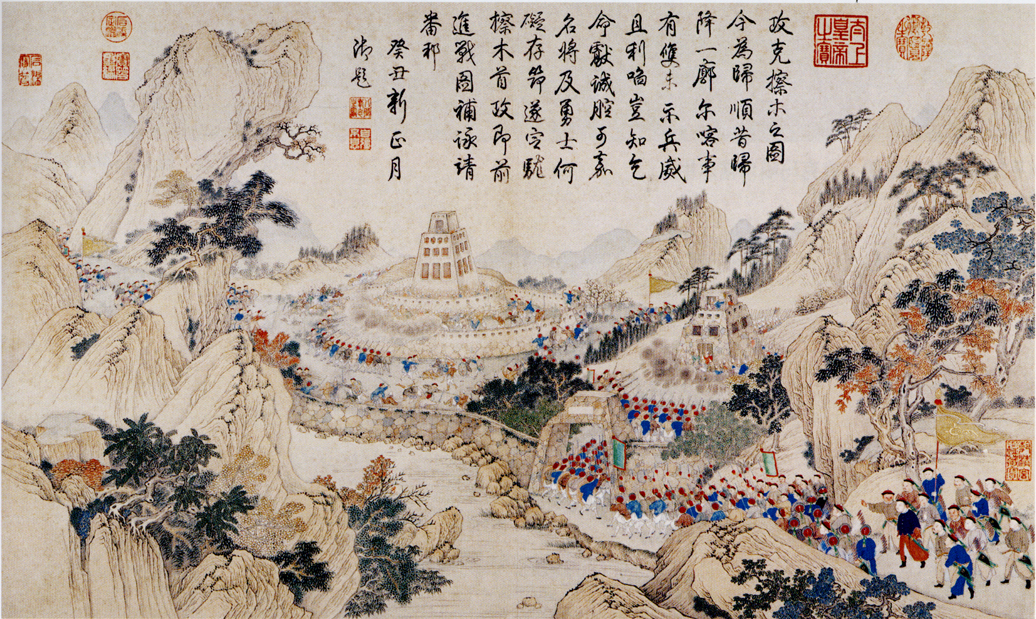
Capture of Camu (village southeast of Zongga)

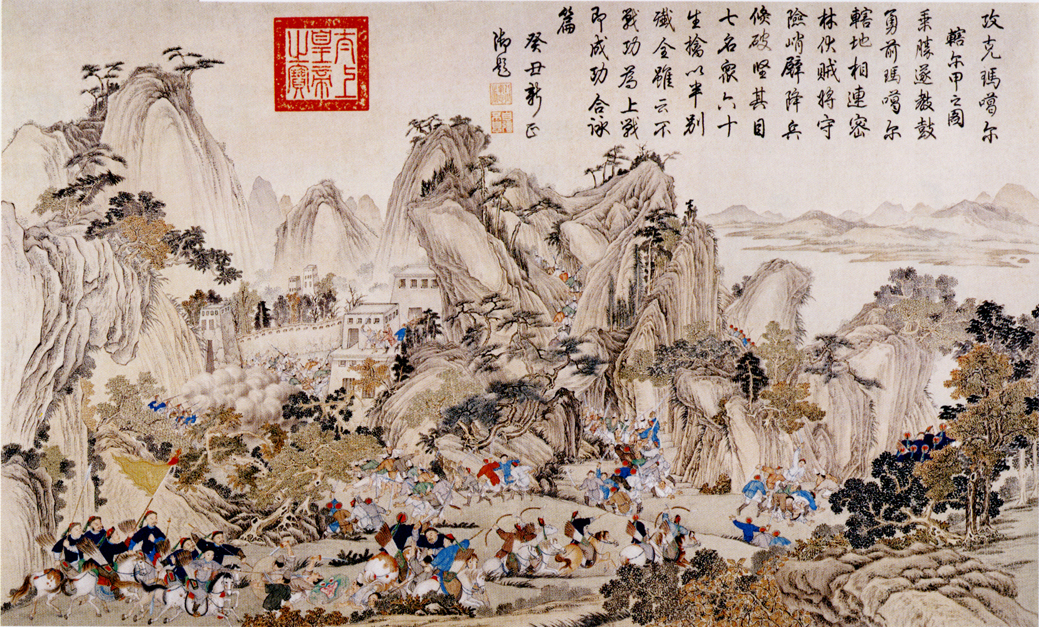
Capture of Magaer (village northwest of Gyirong Town)

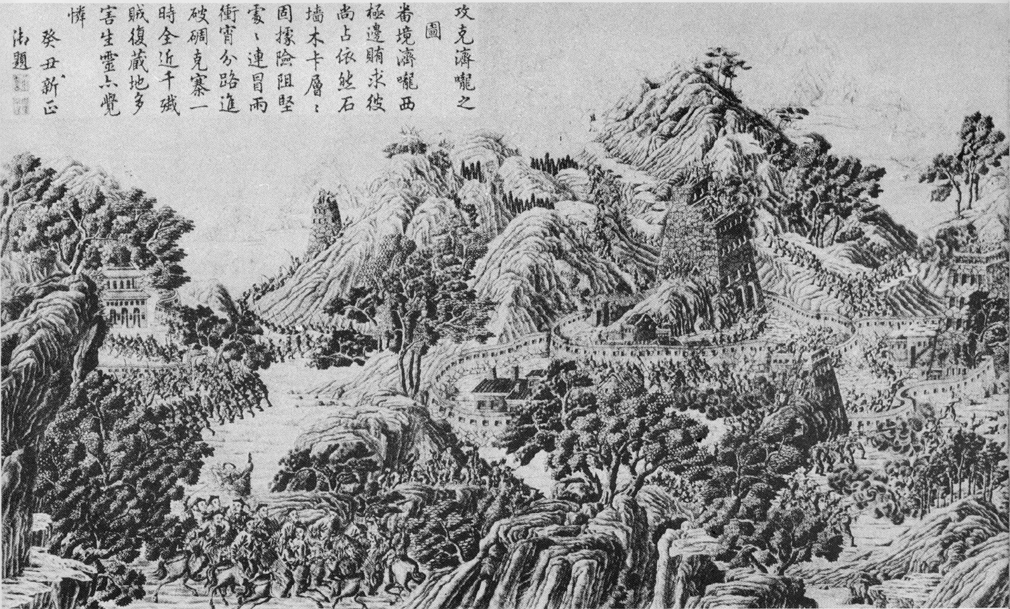
Capture of Jilong (Gyirong Town)

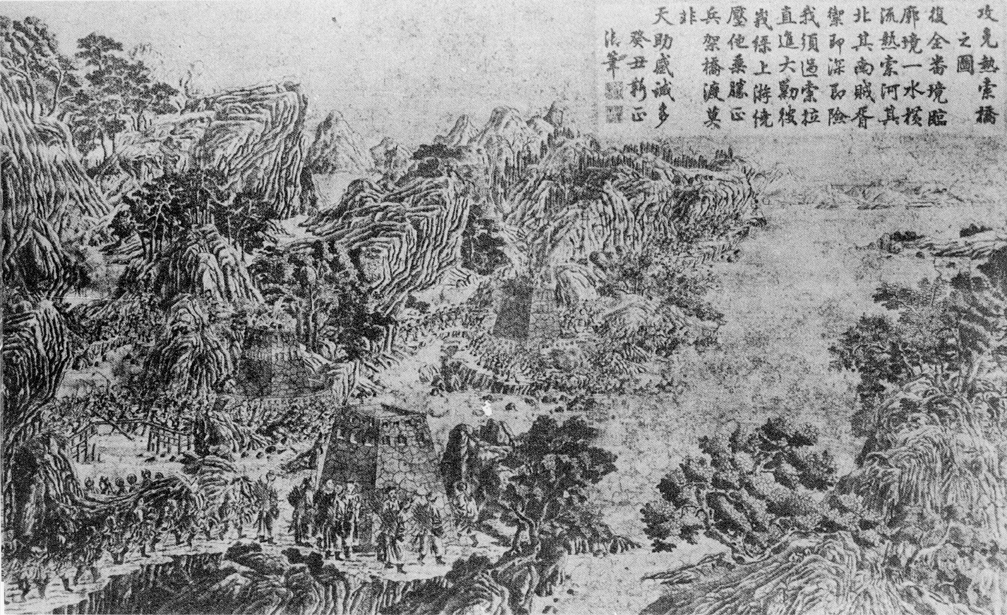
Capture of Resuoqiao (Rasuwa bridge)

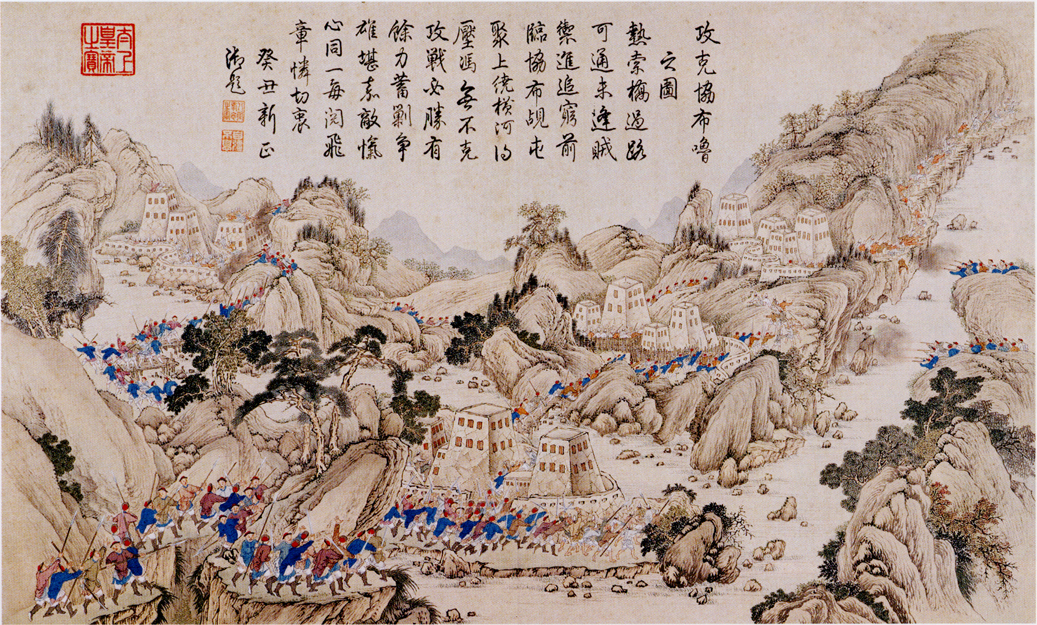
Capture of Xiebulu (Syaphru)

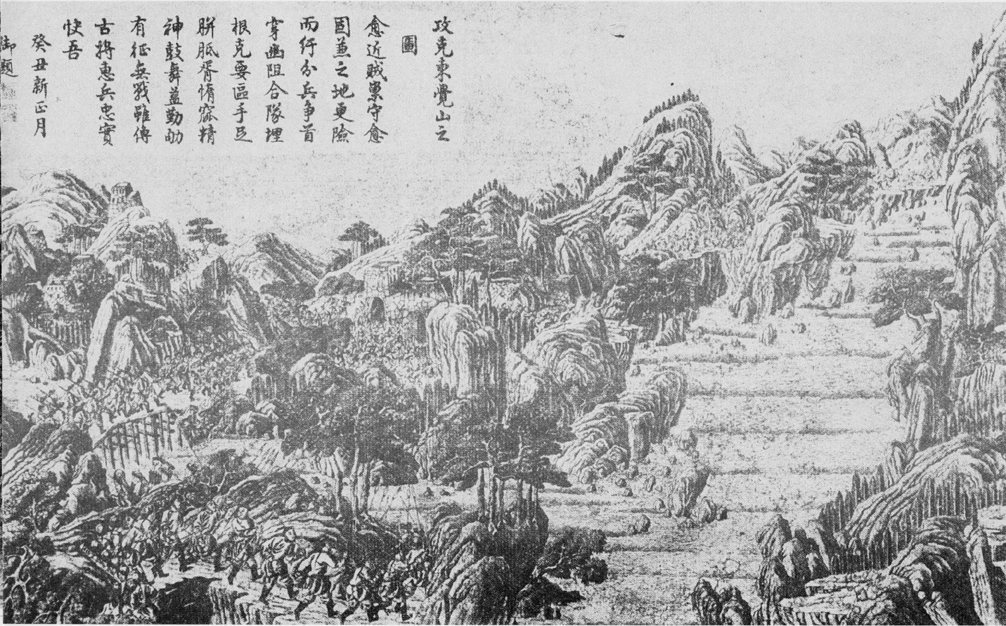
The battle at the mountain Dongjiao (Dhunche)

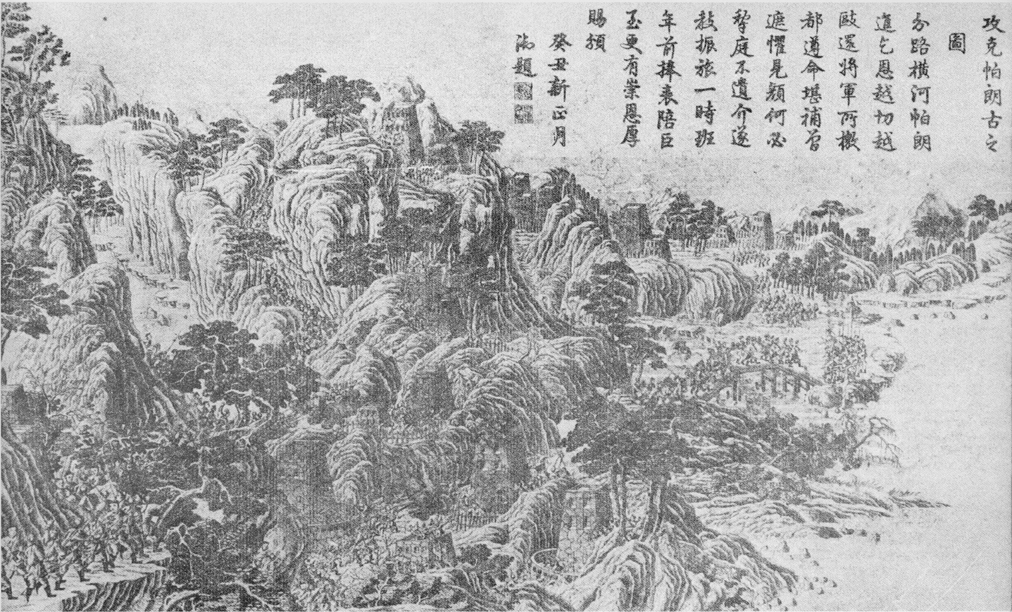
Capture of Palanggu (Phalangu Khola or Falakhu river, a.k.a. Betrawati river)

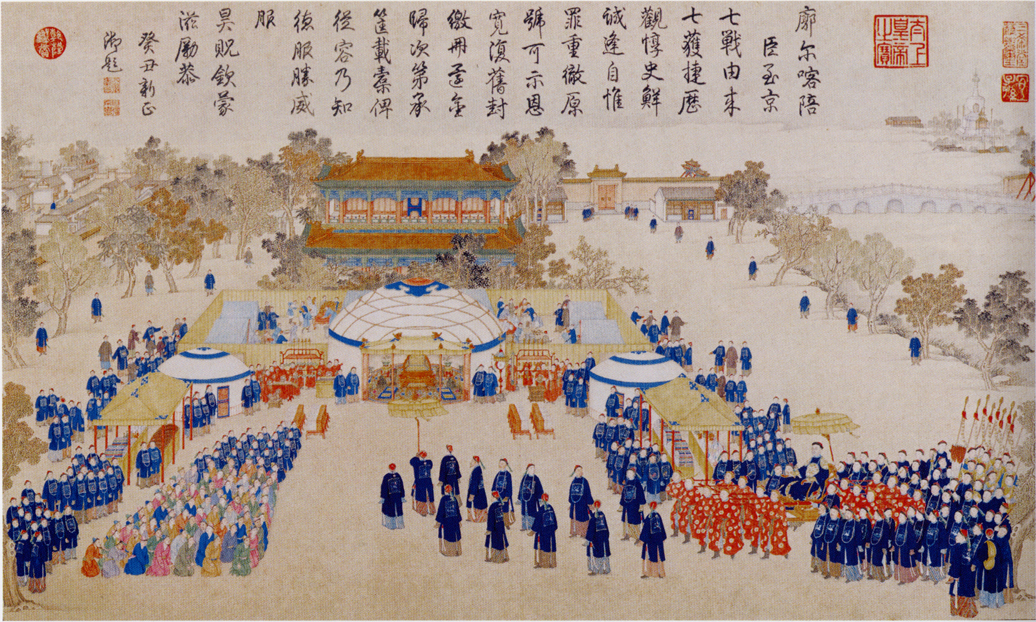
Victory banquet at the Ziguangge (Hall of Purple Glaze) in Zhongnanhai, Beijing

== See also ==
- Tibet under Qing rule
- Ten Great Campaigns
- Nepal–Tibet War (1855–1856)
- Treaty of Thapathali
