= Kantavati Devi =

- Queen consort of Nepal
- Born: Mahottari, Kingdom of Nepal
- Died: 31 October 1799; Arya Ghat, Devapatam, Kingdom of Nepal
- Spouse: Rana Bahadur Shah
- Issue: Girvan Yuddha Bikram Shah; Dhanashahi Lakshmi Devi
Names
- Kantavati Devi Jha
- Dynasty: House of Shah (by marriage)
- Religion: Hinduism

Kantavati Devi (Kantavati Devi Jha) (?–31 October 1799) was the favourite wife of Rana Bahadur Shah, King of Kingdom of Nepal. She was a Maithil Brahmin from Mohtari. She was the mother of King Girvan Yuddha Bikram Shah, who was made heir to the throne by Bahadur Shah for being the son of his favourite wife. She died of smallpox.

Royal titles
Preceded by Rajendra	Queen consort of Nepal; 1795–1799	Succeeded by Gorakshya
