= Gorakshya Rajya Lakshmi Devi =

Gorakshya
- Queen consort of Nepal
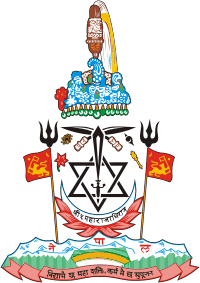
- Born: ca. 1798; Kingdom of Nepal
- Died: 16 December 1816 (aged 17–18); Pashupatinath Temple, Kingdom of Nepal
- Spouse: Girvan Yuddha Bikram Shah
- Issue: Rajendra Bikram Shah; Satyarupa Rajya Lakshmi Devi; Subhagyasundari Rajya Lakshmi Devi a premature child
Names
- Gorakshya Rajya Lakshmi Devi
- Dynasty: House of Shah (by marriage)
- Religion: Hinduism

Gorakshya Rajya Lakshmi Devi (c. 1798 – 16 December 1816) was the junior Queen of Girvan Yuddha Bikram Shah, King of Nepal. She may have been the mother of Rajendra Bikram Shah, in which case she would have given birth to him at around age 15. She may have died of smallpox in 1816, shortly after the death of her husband. However, at the time there was some suspicion that she had been murdered by others who wished to remove her as a potential threat during the coming regency around her infant son.

Edward Gardner, who was the British Representative at the Nepalese court during 1816, stated that, while it was reported she had died of smallpox, he did not believe that was accurate, particularly as she had been exposed to smallpox as a child and would have immunity to the disease. Instead, he attributed her death to premature childbirth, potentially caused by anxiety and distress.

Royal titles
Preceded by Kantavati	Queen consort of Nepal ?–1816	Succeeded by Samrajya
