= Prince Bahadur Shah of Nepal =

Bahadur Shah बहादुर शाह
- Prince Regent of Nepal
- Born: 16 June 1757; Gorkha Palace, Gorkha Kingdom
- Died: 24 June 1797 (aged 40); Aryaghat, Pashupatinath, Kingdom of Nepal
- Spouse: Vidya Lakshmi Devi
- Issue: Ripu Mardan Shah; Shatru Bhanjan Shah
- Dynasty: Shah dynasty
- Father: Prithvi Narayan Shah
- Mother: Narendra Rajya Lakshmi Devi
- Religion: Hinduism

Chief Chautaria & Prince Regent of Nepal
- In office 31 August 1778 – 20 June 1779
- Preceded by: established
- Succeeded by: deposed
- In office 13 July 1785 – 6 June 1794
- Preceded by: reinstated as Chief Chautaria
- Succeeded by: Kirtiman Singh Basnyat as Chief Kazi

Prince Bahadur Shah (Nepali: बहादुर शाह) was the youngest son of King Prithvi Narayan Shah of modern Nepal. He became the regent of Nepal for a brief period after the death of his predecessor Queen Rajendra Laxmi and accelerated his father's campaign for the conquest of the small and scattered Hindu nations of the Himalayas into modern-day Nepal. Despite his many conquests, he also started the tradition of beheading fellow courtiers against his father's advice which would eventually lead to him meeting the same fate. This, along with the political turmoil created in Nepal after his death eventually led to the rise of Bhimsen Thapa and the Anglo-Nepal War.

== Early life ==
Bahadur Shah was born in the palace of Gorkha and was the second son of King Prithvi Narayan Shah. He was originally known as Fateh Bahadur Shah but eventually came to be known as Bahadur Shah. He was educated at the palaces of Gorkha and Nuwakot and also accompanied his father on certain battlefields. Unlike his brother Pratap Singh Shah, who ruled Nepal from his father's death in 1775 until 1777 and was a luxury-loving and indulgent king more interested in tantrism; Bahadur spent most of his time learning about diplomacy from the courtiers in Nuwakot.

== Exile to India ==
After the death of King Prithvi Narayan Shah, his eldest son Pratap Singh Shah succeeded him as the King of Nepal. When Pratap Singh Shah ascended to the throne of Nepal, he immediately detained Bahadur Shah and put him under house arrest in Nuwakot on the advice of his top advisor Bajranath Pandit. After his release from immediate imprisonment, Bahadur Shah spent most of his time in Palpa and Tanahu, both of which used to be independent nations back then. His primary goal was to establish friendly relations with these nations and later gain their alliance in order to continue the unification of Nepal, whilst also regaining his brother's trust. He apparently sent letters back to the capital to Pratap Singh, however, was still not allowed to get back to Nepal. Eventually, Bahadur Shah left for Bettiah district in Bihar, India and lived in exile there.

== Return to Nepal and second exile ==
After the death of Pratap Singh Shah on 17 November 1777, his two-year old son Rana Bahadur Shah ascended to the throne of Nepal while Pratap Singh's eldest wife Queen Rajendra Laxmi began acting as the Regent of Nepal. Since it was customary for a woman to kill herself in her own husband's pyre as a part of a Hindu tradition called Sati), several of the top-ranking courtiers opposed Rajendra Laxmi's decision to remain as the Regent. In order to strengthen her own position, she re-invited the previously exiled Bahadur Shah back to Nepal, and purged her rivals with his support. Included among these was Bajranath Pandit, who had previously counseled Bahadur Shah's exile, whose head was promptly shaved, which was the highest disgrace a "Pandit" could face, and he was banned from Kathmandu. All of Pratap Singh's other wives were forced into Sati, and Rajendra Laxmi consolidated her power. Rajendra Laxmi and Bahadur Shah maintained a joint regency in Nepal for a period of time, but soon fell out due to disagreements between the two regarding the expansion of Nepal. Bahadur Shah insisted that the expansion of Nepal which Prithvi Narayan Shah conducted should be continued while Rajendra Laxmi wanted her son to come of age before there could be further military campaigns. Knowing that most courtiers would agree with Bahadur Shah, Rajendra Laxmi moved swiftly to arrest Bahadur Shah and place him under house arrest. After his release from house arrest, Bahadur Shah in turn put Rajendra Laxmi in house arrest in late 1778. However, during a military campaign to invade Tanahu, taking advantage of his absence from the capital, Rajendra Laxmi seized power again on 20 June 1779, at which point Bahadur Shah went on self-exile to Bettiah again.

== Regency (1785–1794) ==
After the death of Rajendra Laxmi in 1785, Bahadur Shah came back to Nepal and resumed the expansion of Nepal. He took a hardline approach to unification offering one of the options to state kings and princes: accept Gorkha sovereignty while continuing to rule themselves or battle to the death. He also married the sister of King Prithvi Pal Sen of Palpa, one of the more powerful nations bordering Nepal.

Many minor states accepted annexation with notable resistance from Jumla and Doti. The king of Jumla, Shovan Shahi, fled to China, later assisting China in the Sino-Nepalese War. The king of Doti fled to British India and assisted them in the Anglo-Nepalese War. Bahadur Shah then crushed the Limbuwan rebellion on his eastern front and annexed Sikkim with Damodar Pande and Amar Singh Thapa as his military generals. Amar Singh Thapa annexed Kumaon kingdom upon invitation of its minister Hari Singh Dev. However, resistance followed and then a battle. Later the deposed Kumaoni king aided the British in the Anglo-Nepalese War but could not restore his Kingdom.

In 1788 Nepal attacked Tibet over issues of counterfeiting and granted asylum to Shamarpa Lama, who died during the war. Chinese Amban stations in Lhasa dragged China into war, turning it into Sino-Nepalese War in 1792. Nepal asked for British arms which mediator Colonel William Kirkpatrick refused. Nepal was defeated and a peace treaty was signed with China.

After the war, Garhwal submitted to Gorkha sovereignty with its King continuing his rule. From then, Nepal began to see itself as the pan-Himalayan military Hindu kingdom demanding that hill Hindu kings surrender. However, as Kangra resisted with Sikh assistance, deposed kings began to ally with the British against Nepal.

== Later years ==
As the child king came of age, Bahadur Shah's influence in the palace continued to decline. By the time he was forced to retire from his office in 1794, he had had multiple disagreements with the king Rana Bahadur Shah and as such the king viewed him suspicion just like his father and former king Pratap Singh Shah had done before him. After retirement, Bahadur Shah attempted to relocate to China, but his request was declined, so he relocated himself near the Pashupatinath Temple and started living a simple life and practicing religion alongside the saints at the temple, until he was arrested again and imprisoned in February 1797 on several false charges including attempting to kill the king, hold the king in captivity. In addition, his wife was also charged as having poisoned Queen Rajendra Laxmi. There he was tortured for months and kept in total isolation until his death in 24 June in 1797. Although most historians of Nepal agree that King Rana Bahadur Shah was definitely involved in his assassination, the exact method remains a matter of controversy. Most historians agree that he was killed by having hot oil poured on his body, while some believe that he was forcibly hanged.
