= Prithvi Pal Sen =

King of Palpa
- Reign: ???? – April 1806
- Predecessor: Mahadatta Sen
- Successor: Position abolished
- Born: Kingdom of Palpa
- Died: April 1806; Hanuman Dhoka, Nepal
- Dynasty: Sen dynasty
- Father: Mahadatta Sen
- Religion: Hinduism

Prithvi Pal Sen (Nepali: पृथ्वीपाल सेन) was the King of Palpa.

== Biography ==
Prithvi Pal Sen was crowned the King of Palpa after the death of his father Mahadatta Sen.

Sen crowned Girvan Yuddha Bikram Shah as the King of Nepal after Rana Bahadur Shah had abdicated the throne.

He died in April 1806. After his death, Palpa was subsumed into the Kingdom of Nepal.
