= Sher Bahadur Shah =

Nepalese noble

- शेरबहादुर शाह

Chautaria
- In office 1794–1806
- Monarch: Rana Bahadur Shah

Personal details
- Born: January 1778 Hanuman Dhoka Palace, Kingdom of Nepal
- Died: 25 April 1806 (aged 28) Basantapur, Kingdom of Nepal
- Cause of death: Assassination
- Citizenship: Nepali
- Parents: Pratap Singh Shah (father); Maiju Rani Maneshvari Devi (mother)

Sher Bahadur Shah (Nepali: शेरबहादुर शाह; January 1778 – 25 April 1806) was a Nepalese noble who served as Chautaria (prime minister) from 1794 until his assassination in 1806. He was the son of King Pratap Singh Shah and the 3rd dynasty royal prince of Nepal.

== Biography ==
Sher Bahadur Shah was born at Hanuman Dhoka on January 1778 to King Pratap Singh Shah and Maiju Rani Maneshvari Devi. His mother, from a Newar family, was a concubine of the king.

Shah was promoted to Chautaria in 1794 by Rana Bahadur Shah.

There was a conspiracy led by Prince Bahadur Shah, son of Prithvi Narayan Shah, to depose then king Rana Bahadur Shah and install Sher Bahadur Shah on the throne.

In 1806, Shah assassinated his half brother Rana Bahadur Shah, which ultimately led to the 1806 Bhandarkhal massacre.

Sher Bahadur Shah was assassinated by Bal Narsingh Kunwar on 25 April 1806.
