= Rajendra Rajya Laxmi Devi =

Rajendra
- Queen consort of Nepal; Queen regent of Nepal
- Reign: 1777–1785
- Born: Palpa Darbar, Kingdom of Palpa
- Died: 1785; Hanuman Dhoka Palace, Kathmandu, Kingdom of Nepal
- Spouse: Pratap Singh Shah
- Issue: Nagendra Shah; Rana Bahadur Shah
Names
- Rajendra Rajya Lakshmi Devi
- Dynasty: House of Shah (by marriage)
- Religion: Hinduism

Rajendra Rajya Lakshmi Devi (died 1785), was the consort of Pratap Singh Shah, king of the Kingdom of Nepal. She was the regent of Nepal during the minority of her son Rana Bahadur Shah between 1777 and 1785. During her eight years of regency, she contributed to the unification of modern Nepal begun by Prithvi Narayan Shah.

== Life ==
Rajendra Rajya Lakshmi Devi was born as a princess in Palpa.

Rajendra Lakshmi Devi was the daughter of Mukunda Sen. She was the mother of Nagendra Shah (died aged six months) and Rana Bahadur Shah. Her husband Pratap Singh Shah became king at the age of 23, and died when he was 26. Rajendra Rajya Lakshmi Devi then became queen regent for her son Rana Bahadur Shah.

=== Regency ===
She became regent on 17 November 1777. In 1778, she was taken prisoner in silver handcuffs.

She was restored on 20 June 1779 and continued to be queen regent until her death. During the time, the principalities of Lamjung, Kaski and Tanahun were annexed to the kingdom of Nepal, under her military leadership.

=== Death ===
Rajendra Lakshmi Devi died on 1785 due to tuberculosis in Hanuman Dhoka Palace of Kathmandu.

== Historic evaluation ==
Queen Regent Rajendra Rajya Lakshmi repelled the combined attacks of the Chaubise kings, and expanded Nepal's borders up to the Kali Gandaki. She is viewed as an able administrator who extended King Prithvi Narayan Shah's unification campaign. However, her reign was not free of problems, due to her strife with her brother-in-law Bahadur Shah, her court had become a hub of intrigues and conspiracies.

Royal titles
Preceded by Narendra	Queen consort of Nepal ?–1777	Succeeded by Kantavati
