= Pratap Singh Shah =

King of Nepal from 1775 to 1777

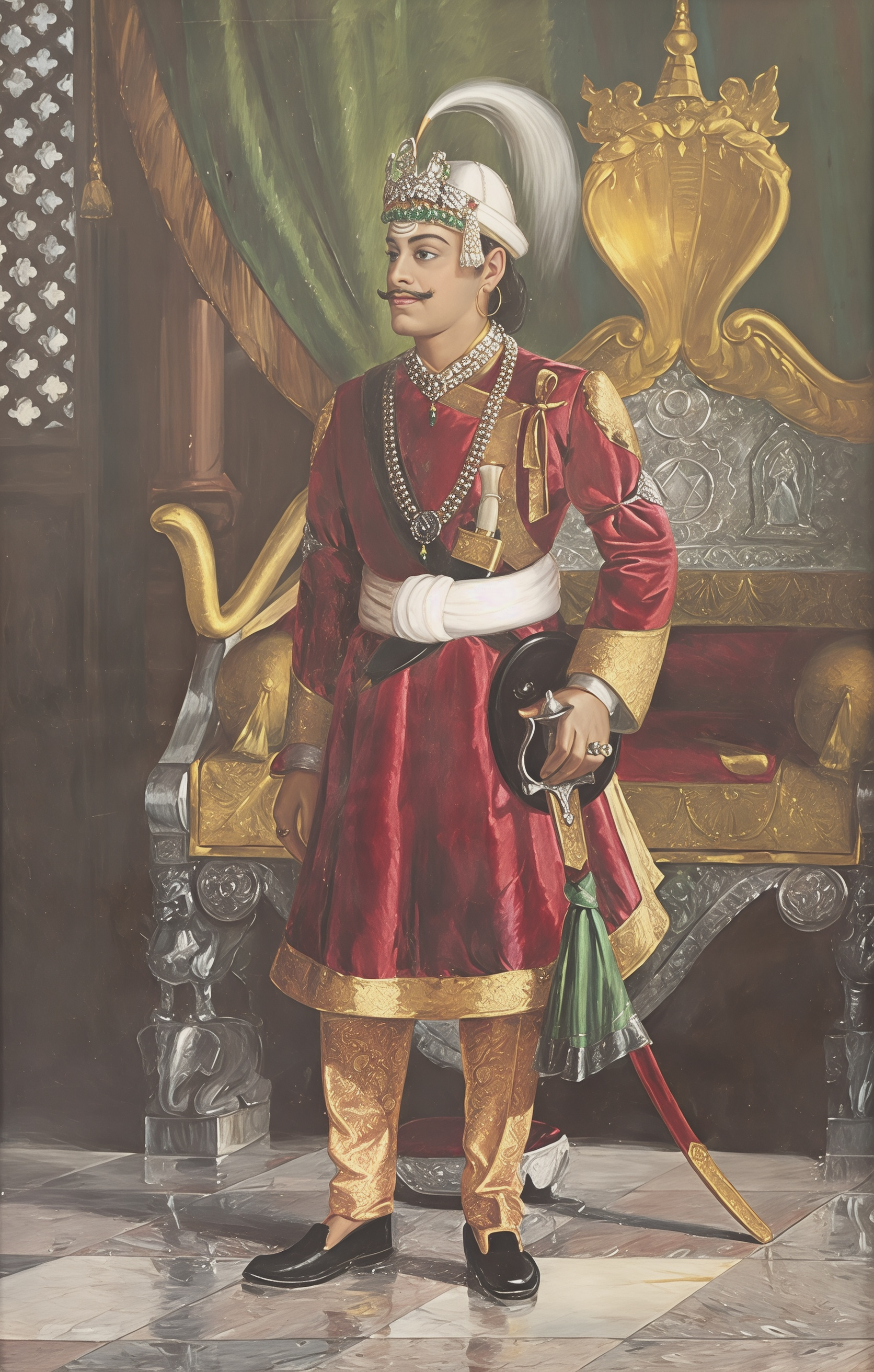

King of Nepal
- Reign: 11 January 1775 – 17 November 1777
- Coronation: 12 January 1775
- Predecessor: Prithvi Narayan Shah
- Successor: Rana Bahadur Shah
- Born: 16 April 1751; Gorkha, Gorkha Kingdom
- Died: 17 November 1777 (aged 26) (tuberculosis); Kathmandu, Kingdom of Nepal
- Spouse: Rajendra Rajya Lakshmi Devi
- Issue: Nagendra Shah (died young); Rana Bahadur Shah; Bidur Bahadur Shah; Sher Bahadur Shah
Regnal name
- Shree Paanch Maharajadhiraj Pratap Singh Shah Dev
- Dynasty: Shah
- Father: Prithvi Narayan Shah
- Mother: Narendra Rajya Lakshmi Devi
- Religion: Hinduism

Pratap Singh Shah (Nepali: प्रतापसिंह शाह), (16 April 1751– 17 November 1777), was King of Nepal. He was the eldest son of Prithvi Narayan Shah, the king who started the unification of Nepal.

He became king at the age of 24 in 1775. Pratap Singh Shah ruled for only 2 years 10 months, up to 1777, and died of smallpox at the age of 26. He was succeeded by his two-year-old son Rana Bahadur Shah. He did not actively participate in the unification campaign led by his father. So, he is often remembered as Non-capable son of capable father. The boundaries of Nepal continued to expand after his reign, as his wife Rajendra Laxmi and his brother, Prince Bahadur Shah, continued the unification campaign as regents of his son, Ranabahadur Shah.

Pratap Singh Shah Shah dynasty Born: 16 April 1751 Died: 17 November 1777
Regnal titles
Preceded by Prithvi Narayan Shah	King of Nepal; 1775–1777	Succeeded by Rana Bahadur Shah
