= Rana Bahadur Shah =

King of Nepal from 1777 to 1799

- Maharajadhiraja
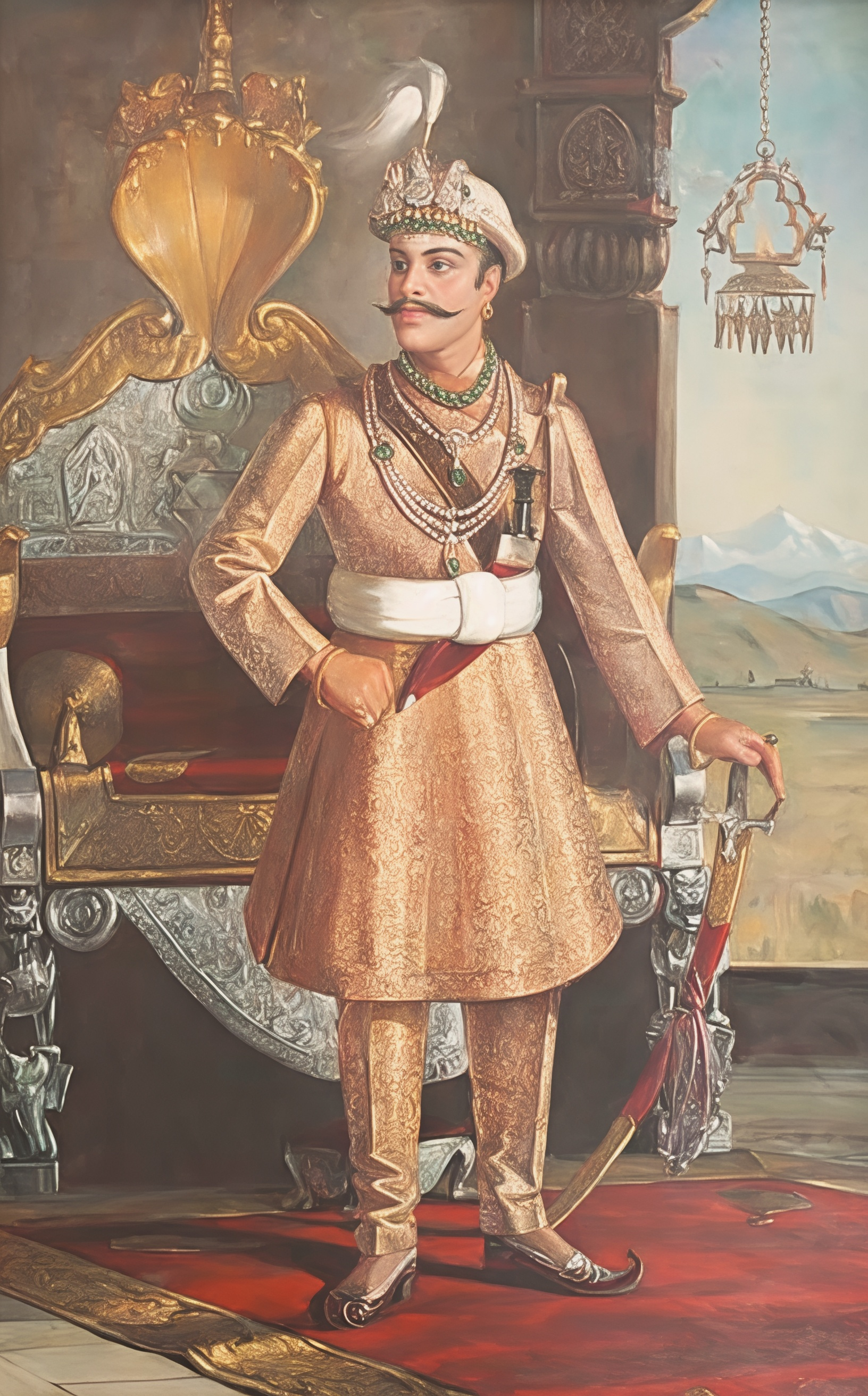

King of Nepal
- Reign: 17 November 1777 – 8 March 1799
- Coronation: January 1778
- Predecessor: Pratap Singh Shah
- Successor: Girvan Yuddha Bikram Shah
- Regent: Rajendra Rajya Laxmi (1777–1785); Bahadur Shah (1785–1794)

Mukhitiyar of Nepal
- Preceded by: Office established
- Succeeded by: Bhimsen Thapa
- Born: 25 May 1775; Basantapur, Kingdom of Nepal
- Died: 25 April 1806 (aged 30); Basantapur, Kingdom of Nepal
- Cause of death: Assassination
- Spouse: Raj Rajeshwari Devi (m. 1789); Subarna Prabha Devi (m. 1791); Kantavati Devi (m. 1797; died 1799); Lalit Tripura Sundari Devi (m. 1804)
- Issue: Ranodyot Bikram Shah; Samarsher Shah; Girvan Yuddha Bikram Shah; Tilottoma Devi; Amar Lakshmi Devi; Vilasvati Lakshmi Devi; Dhanashahi Lakshmi Devi
- House: Shah dynasty
- Father: Pratap Singh Shah
- Mother: Rajendra Rajya Laxmi Devi

Rana Bahadur Shah (Nepali: श्री ५ महाराजाधिराज रण बहादुर शाह देव; 25 May 1775 – 25 April 1806) was King of Nepal, he succeeded to the throne after the death of his father, King Pratap Singh Shah. He ruled under the regencies of his mother, Queen Rajendra Rajya Lakshmi Devi (died, 13 July 1785 from tuberculosis), and then of his uncle, Bahadur Shah. During this time, the kingdom was expanded by conquest to include the Garhwal and Kumaon regions, now part of India. He imprisoned his uncle, Bahadur Shah, who died in jail.

== Reign ==
The premature death of Pratap Singh Shah (reigned 1775–77), the eldest son of Prithvi Narayan Shah, left a huge power vacuum that remained unfilled for decades, seriously debilitating the emerging Nepalese state. Pratap Singh Shah's successor was his son, Rana Bahadur Shah (reigned 1777–99), aged two and one-half years at his accession. The acting regent until 1785 was Queen Rajendralakshmi, followed by Bahadur Shah (reigned 1785–94), the second son of Prithvi Narayan Shah. Court life was consumed by rivalry centered on alignments with these two regents rather than on issues of national administration, and it set a bad precedent for future competition among contending regents. The exigencies of the Sino-Nepalese War in 1788–92 had forced Bahadur Shah to temporarily take a pro-British stance, which led to a commercial treaty with the British in 1792.

Meanwhile, Rana Bahadur's youth had been spent in pampered luxury. In 1794 King Rana Bahadur Shah came of age, and his first act was to reconstitute the government so that his uncle, Bahadur Shah, had no official part to play. In mid 1795, he became infatuated with a Maithili Brahman widow, Kantavati Jha, and married her on the oath of making their illegitimate half-caste son (as per the Hindu law of that time) the heir apparent, by excluding the legitimate heir from his previous marriage. (Note: Rana Bahadur Shah had two legitimate wives before marrying Kantavati. His first wife was Rajarajeshwari, Devi with whom he begot one daughter. His second wife was Subarnaprabha Devi with whom he begot two sons, Rana Udghot Shah and Shamsher Shah. Rana Udghot Shah was the eldest male heir apparent of Rana Bahadur Shah.) By 1797, his relationship with his uncle, who was living a retired life, and who wanted to seek refuge in China on the pretext of meeting the new emperor, had deteriorated to the extent that he ordered his imprisonment (on 19 February 1797) and his subsequent murder (on 23 June 1797). Such acts earned Rana Bahadur notoriety both among courtiers and common people, especially among Brahmins.

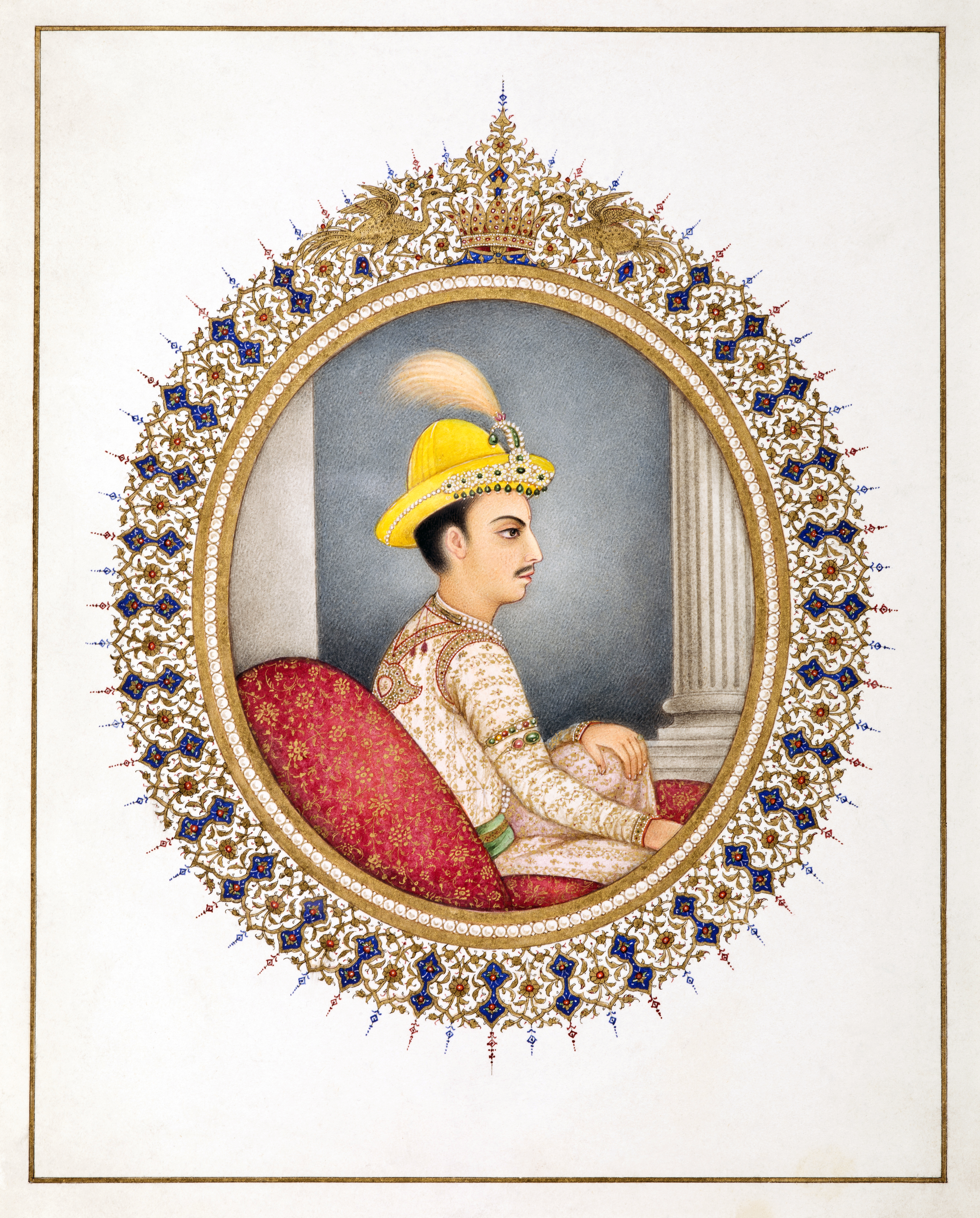
Girvan Yuddha Bikram Shah was crowned king after Shah left for Varanasi.

That same year in 1797, Girvan Yuddha Bikram Shah was born and was immediately declared the crown prince. However, within a year of Girvan's birth, Kantavati contracted tuberculosis; it was advised by physicians that she perform ascetic penances to cure herself. To make sure that Girvan succeeded to the throne while Kantavati was still alive, Rana Bahadur, aged just 23, abdicated in favor of their son on 23 March 1799, placing his first wife, Raj Rajeshwari, as the regent. He joined his ailing wife, Kantavati, and his second wife, Subarnaprabha, in ascetic life and started to live in Deopatan, donning saffron robes and titling himself Swami Nirgunanda. (Note: From here on Rana Bahadur Shah became known as Swami Maharaj. Rana Bahadur however was an ascetic in name only. Although Rana Bahadur left the royal duties after his abdication, he did not relinquish any of its privileges and luxuries.) This move was also supported by all the courtiers who were discontented with his wanton and capricious behavior. It was around this time that both Bhimsen Thapa and his father Amar Singh Thapa (sanu) were promoted from subedar to the rank of sardar, and Bhimsen began to serve as the ex-King's chief bodyguard. However, Rana Bahadur's renunciation lasted only a few months. After the inevitable death of Kantavati, Rana Bahadur suffered a mental breakdown during which he lashed out by desecrating temples and cruelly punishing the attendant physicians and astrologers. He then renounced his ascetic life and attempted to re-assert his royal authority. This led to a direct conflict with almost all the courtiers who had pledged a holy oath of allegiance to the legitimate King Girvan; this conflict eventually led to the establishment of a dual government and to an imminent civil war, with Damodar Pande leading the military force against the dissenting ex-King and his group. Since most of the military officers had sided with the courtiers, Rana Bahadur realized that his authority could not be re-established; and he was forced to flee to the British-controlled city of Varanasi in May, 1800.

=== Exile in Varanasi: 1800–1804 ===
As Rana Bahadur Shah's best friend and advisor, Bhimsen Thapa also accompanied him to Varanasi. Rana Bahadur's retinue included his first wife, Rajarajeshvari, while his second wife, Subarnaprabha, stayed back in Kathmandu to serve as regent. Since Rana Bahadur was willing to do anything to regain his power and punish those who had forced him into exile, he served as a focal point for dissident factions in Varanasi. He first sought help from the British, in exchange for which he was willing to concede a trading post in Kathmandu and grant them a percentage of the tax revenue. However, the British were in favor of working with the existing government in Nepal, rather than risking restoring an exiled ex-king to power. The Kathmandu Durbar was willing to appease the British and agreed to sign a commercial treaty, as long as the wayward Rana Bahadur and his group were held in India under strict British surveillance. This arrangement was kept a secret from Rana Bahadur and his group; when they eventually became aware of the strictures on their movement, and hence the treaty, they were incensed at the British as well as the proponents (Damodar Pande and his faction) of this treaty in Nepal. An elaborate intrigue was set in motion with the aim of splitting the unity of courtiers in the Kathmandu Durbar and fomenting anti-British feelings. A flurry of letters were exchanged between the ex-king and individual courtiers, through which he tried to set them up against Damodar Pande and tried to woo them with promises of lifelong high government positions that could be inherited by their progeny.

Meanwhile, Rajarajeshwari, fed up with her debauched husband, left Varanasi, (Note: The exact reason for Rajarajeshwari's departure from Varanasi is a matter of controversy. In Varanasi, Rana Bahadur had sold all her jewelry to support his dissipation and had acquired many new wives and concubines. He regularly mistreated Rajarajeshwari, and once even humiliated her in public before a prostitute. So, her sense of frustration could have made her leave Varanasi. But at the same time, there is also evidence to support that Rana Bahadur sent her back to Kathmandu with a political motive.) entered the border of Nepal on 26 July 1801, and taking advantage of the weak regency, was slowly making her way towards Kathmandu with the view of taking over the regency. Back in Kathmandu the court politics turned complicated when Mul Kaji (or chief minister) Kirtiman Singh Basnet, a favorite of the Regent Subarnaprabha, was secretly assassinated on 28 September 1801, by the supporters of Rajarajeshwari. In the resulting confusion many courtiers were jailed, while some executed, based solely on rumors. Bakhatbar Singh Basnet, brother of assassinated Kirtiman Singh, was then given the post of mul kaji During his tenure as the mul kaji, on 28 October 1801, a Treaty of Commerce and Alliance (Note: The treaty was signed by Gajraj Misra, on the behalf of Nepal Durbar, and Charles Crawford, on the behalf of East India Company, in Danapur, India. Among the articles in the treaty, it decided on perpetual peace and friendship between the two states, on the pension for Rana Bahadur Shah, the establishment of a British Residency in Kathmandu, and an establishment of trade relations between the two states.) was finally signed between Nepal and East India Company that led to the establishment of the first British Resident, Captain William O. Knox, who was reluctantly welcomed by the courtiers in Kathmandu on 16 April 1802. (Note: Knox had previously accompanied Captain William Kirkpatrick in the 1792 British diplomatic mission to Nepal as a Lieutenant in charge of the military escort. In Knox's 1801 mission, he was accompanied by experts like the naturalist Francis Buchanan-Hamilton, who later published An Account of the Kingdom of Nepal in 1819, and the surveyor Charles Crawford, who made the first scientific maps of Kathmandu valley and of Nepal, and proposed that the Himalayas might be among the highest mountains in the world.) The primary objective of Knox's mission was to bring the trade treaty of 1792 into full effect and to establish a "controlling influence" in Nepali politics. Almost eight months after the establishment of the Residency, Rajarajeshwari finally managed to assume the regency on 17 December 1802.

=== Return to Kathmandu ===
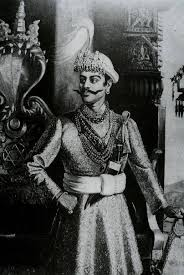
Aggressive looking Rana Bahadur Shah

After Rajarajeshwari took over the regency, she was pressured by Knox to pay the annual pension of 82,000 rupees to the ex-King as per the obligations of the treaty, which paid off the vast debt that Rana Bahadur Shah had accumulated in Varanasi due to his spendthrift habits. (Note: Rana Bahadur had borrowed a lot of money from many different people: Rs 60,000 from Dwarika Das; Rs 100,000 from Raja Shivalal Dube; Rs 1,400 from Ambasankar Bhattnagar. Similarly, he had borrowed a lot of money from the East India Company as well. However, Rana Bahadur was reckless in the manner he spent the borrowed money. For instance, he had once given an alms of Rs 500 to a Brahmin. For more details see) The Nepalese court also felt it prudent to keep Rana Bahadur in isolation in Nepal itself, rather than in the British controlled India, and that paying off Rana Bahadur's debts could facilitate his return at an opportune moment. Rajarajeshwari's presence in Kathmandu also stirred unrest among the courtiers that aligned themselves around her and Subarnaprabha. Sensing an imminent hostility, Knox aligned himself with Subarnaprabha and attempted to interfere with the internal politics of Nepal. Getting a wind of this matter, Rajarajeshwari dissolved the government and elected new ministers, with Damodar Pande as the mul kaji, while the Resident Knox, finding himself persona non grata and the objectives of his mission frustrated, voluntarily left Kathmandu to reside in Makwanpur citing a cholera epidemic. Subarnaprabha and the members of her faction were arrested.

Such open display of anti-British feelings and humiliation prompted the Governor General of the time Richard Wellesley to recall Knox to India and unilaterally suspend the diplomatic ties. The Treaty of 1801 was also unilaterally annulled by the British on 24 January 1804. The suspension of diplomatic ties also gave the Governor General a pretext to allow the ex-King Rana Bahadur to return to Nepal unconditionally.

As soon as they received the news, Rana Bahadur and his group proceeded towards Kathmandu. Some troops were sent by Kathmandu Durbar to check their progress, but the troops changed their allegiance when they came face to face with the ex-King. Damodar Pande and his men were arrested at Thankot where they were waiting to greet the ex-King with state honors and take him into isolation. After Rana Bahadur's reinstatement to power, he started to extract vengeance on those who had tried to keep him in exile.

On April 25, 1806, he was beheaded by his half-brother, Sher Bahadur Shah. Rana Bahadur's death was followed by the Bhandarkhal massacre.

== See also ==
- Nepali Mandir
- Pratap Singh Shah
- Sher Bahadur Shah
- 1806 Bhandarkhal massacre

== Notes ==
Rana Bahadur Shah Shah dynasty Born: 25 May 1775 Died: 25 April 1806
Regnal titles
| Preceded by Pratap Singh Shah | King of Nepal; 1777–1799 | Succeeded by Girvan Yuddha Bikram Shah |
