= KC (surname) =

Chhetri subcaste of Brahmin descent and the family name used from this subcaste

KC (or K.C, K.C.) is a surname of medieval origin anglicized as an abbreviation of Khatri Chhetri in Nepal. With its origin in the 12th century CE, the archaic form of the surname "Khatri" was ascribed as a local endonym for the descendants of Brahmins from medieval India and Khas mothers of the Middle Himalayas in medieval western Nepal. The Hinduised hill principalities of Nepal continued this long-standing social tradition in the subsequent centuries, and the progenies of Brahmin fathers and Kshatriya (Chhetri) mothers were referred to as Khatri Chhetris. In the political history of Nepal, large number of Khatris were Sardar (or the Chief of Nepalese administration and military) of Gorkha Kingdom and Kingdom of Nepal, and educated Khatri families with linguistic expertise in English, Hindi and Nepali languages were pivotal to Nepal's diplomatic mission in the western world during the 19th and 20th centuries.

== History ==
Medieval History

Dislodged by the Ghurid conquest of India and subsequent Delhi Sultanate, Brahmins from various regions of medieval India began emigrating to the hills of western Nepal primarily after the 12th century CE where they encountered another Indo-Aryan peoples called Khas. The progeny resulting from the marriages of Brahmin men and Khas women were called Khatris. Throughout the subsequent centuries, the nomenclature associated with this social tradition continued and the descendants of Brahmin fathers and a Kshatriya (Chhetri) mothers were ascribed as "Khatri or Khatri Chhetri", and were categorized as Hindu sacred thread-wearing Tagadhari Kshatriyas of Nepal.

Gorkha Kingdom and the Unification of Nepal

Khatris have played a vital role in the unification of Kingdom of Nepal and thereafter as administrators, governors, political leaders and military commanders. Large number of Khatri commanders became governors (Kaji) of various regions during the unification of Nepal by King Prithvi Narayan Shah; Kaji Ram Khatri, Kaji Bhim Khatri, Kaji Bir khatri and Kaji Hari Khatri each governed newly consolidated Kingdom of Palpa, regions surrounding Gorkha and Kathmandu valley, central Nepal and hilly regions of eastern Nepal respectively. Between 1768 and 1814, Chandrabhan Khatri, Ranabir Khatri, Shiva Narayan Khatri, Gaja Simha Khatri, Damu Khatri and Vamsha Raj Khatri were appointed as the Chief of administration and military, called Sardar, by king Prithvi Narayan Shah and subsequent Shah kings after the merging of Kingdom of Gorkha into the unified Kingdom of Nepal. During the Rana dynasty rule, Kaji Bishnu Khatri was appointed to govern hill regions of eastern Nepal, Kaji Tribhuvan Khatri governed Terai in a close proximity to British India and Kaji Bhairav Khatri governed hill regions of the western frontier.

19th-Century to Modern Period

In 1850 AD, Khatris were among the first Nepalese to travel to England and France as a part of a royal mission. Three Khatri commanders of the Nepalese army namely Kaji Karbir Khatri, Lieutenant Lal Singh Khatri and Lieutenant Karbir Khatri accompanied Nepal's ruler Jung Bahadur Rana's visit to Europe and Lieutenant Lal Singh Khatri, among them, was also the first Nepalese to study English in the British Residency at the Court of Nepal. As Nepal opened up to the western world, Khatris were pivotal to carry out English language administrative affairs and international correspondences of the 19th and 20th century.

In the transformative era of the mid 1950s, Khagendra Bahadur KC served as the first English secretary of the government of the Kingdom of Nepal after the establishment of constitutional monarchy and the fall of the Rana Dynasty rule. Similarly, Keshar Bahadur KC served as Nepal's first Ambassador to China during the Chairmanship of Mao Zedong in the mid-1950s. Throughout most of the 1960s and 1970s, former Major General Padma Bahadur Khatri served as the Ambassador of Nepal to the United States working with the administrations of American presidents Lyndon B. Johnson, Richard Nixon, Gerald Ford and Jimmy Carter, and also delivered the application for the membership of Nepal in the United Nations and later served twice as the President of the United Nations Security Council. In modern Nepal, KCs are prominently visible in politics, cinema, army, arts, education, medicine, business, fashion and sports of Nepal, among others.

Toponyms

Khatrigaun, meaning village of Khatris, is a historic toponym of 35 villages of Nepal, of 12 villages of Bagmati province in Kathmandu, Lalitpur, Bhaktapur, Kavre, Dolakha, Dhading, Nuwakot, and Sindhupalchok, 10 villages of Koshi province in Ilam, Okhaldhunga, Khotang, Taplejung, Tehrathum, Pachthar and Bhojpur; 7 villages of Gandaki province in Gorkha, Kaski, Lamjung and Tanahun; and 6 villages of Karnali province in Salyan and western Rukum of Nepal.

== Notable KCs ==
- Guru Maharaj Narayan Gautam Khatri aka "Swami Hamsananda", Hindu saint and founder of prominent Swargadwari Temple of Nepal in the 19th century
- Queen Maharani Nanda Kumari Khatri, wife of Nepal's ruler Jung Bahadur Rana
- Lal Singh Khatri, first Nepalese person to study English, army Lieutenant and an entourage of 1850's Jung Bahadur Rana's visit to Britain and France
- Shiva Narayan Khatri, Kaji of Nepal of 18th century and military commander of the unification of Nepal under king Rana Bahadur Shah
- Karbir Khatri, Kaji of Nepal of 19th century and entourage of 1850's Jung Bahadur Rana's visit to Britain and France
- Sanak Singh Khatri, 19th century military commander of Nepal and brother-in-law of Nepal's ruler Jung Bahadur Rana
- Bhawani Singh Khatri, Governor (Sardar) of Kingdom of Nepal of 19th century under King Rajendra Bikram Shah
- Ranabir Khatri, Governor (Sardar) of Gorkha Kingdom of 18th century
- Indraman Khatri, Governor (Sardar) of Kingdom of Nepal of 18-19th century under Queen Rajendra Rajya Laxmi and Bahadur Shah
- Gaja Simha Khatri, Governor (Sardar) of Gorkha Kingdom/Kingdom of Nepal of 19th century
- Vamsha Raj Khatri, Governor (Sardar) of Gorkha Kingdom, fought in the Anglo-Nepalese war
- Chandrabhan Khatri, Governor (Sardar) of Gorkha Kingdom and Kingdom of Nepal of 18th-19th century
- Kul Bahadur KC, late Nepalese Poet and laureate
- Hira Singh Khatri, first Director of Nepalese Film industry with 1964's movie Aama
- Surya Bahadur KC, late industrialist and founder of Machhapuchhre Bank Ltd, Rara Noodle, 'KC Group Nepal', and Parliamentarian of Nepal
- Keshar Bahadur KC, Nepal's first Ambassador to China during the Chairmanship of Mao Zedong
- Padma Bahadur Khatri, late former foreign minister of Nepal, President of the United Nations Security Council and Nepalese Ambassador to the United States
- Khagendra Bahadur KC, first English secretary of the Kingdom of Nepal of mid-20th century
- Nayan Bahadur Khatri, longest serving late Chief Justice of Nepal, also Ambassador to China from 1986 to 1990
- Rajendra Chhetri (KC), former head of Nepal Army
- Dr. Manoj KC, 34th Inspector General of Nepal Police, the highest police rank of Nepal
- Phuspa Ram KC, former Head of Armed Police Force of Nepal
- Pradeep Jung KC, vice-chief and second highest rank (Lieutenant General) of Nepal Army
- Gaurab Kumar KC, Major General and third-highest rank of Nepal Army
- Kiran K.C, former Major General of Nepal Army
- Dr. Nagendra Bahadur KC, former Major General of Nepal Army and Director General of Nepalese Army Institute of Health Sciences
- Madan Khatri Chhetri (KC), Royal Nepal army Lieutenant Colonel glorified as "Captain Madan KC" in the Hollywood movie Everest
- Gopal Bahadur Khatri Chhetri, late colonel and Aide de Camp (ADC) to King Mahendra of Nepal
- Arjun Narasingha K.C., former five-time Minister of Nepal and Senior Nepali Congress Leader
- Chitra Bahadur K.C., former Deputy Prime Minister of Nepal and chairman of the Rashtriya Jana Morcha Party
- Dr. Govinda K.C., Nepalese orthopedic surgeon and philanthropic activist
- Jyoti KC, first Nepalese-American astronaut and Commander crew of NASA's Sirius mission
- Dr. Kedar Narsingh KC, President of Nepal Medical Association and former Director of the National Tuberculosis Center
- Atithi Gautam K.C, youngest singer in the world to release a professional solo album
- Sugarika KC, former Miss Nepal World and television host
- Ashma KC, former Miss Nepal World
- Sumana KC, former Miss Nepal Earth
- Roshni Khatri, former Miss Nepal Earth and actress
- Dikshya KC, former Mrs. Nepal World
- Karishma K.C. (Manandhar), one of the most prominent Nepalese actress
- Bhuwan K.C., Nepalese actor, director, producer, singer and filmmaker
- Anmol K.C., actor and producer
- Kristi KC (Mainali), one of the prominent Nepalese actress of the 80s and 90s
- Renu KC, late mother of Nepalese movie superstar Rajesh Hamal
- Sushant KC, Nepalese singer, songwriter and music producer
- Avantika Khatri, Indian Bollywood actress, producer, and director
- Nandita K.C., Nepalese actress
- Bhavna Khatri, Indian Bollywood actress
- Sita KC, Nepalese singer
- Sandhya KC, Nepalese actress
- Sushmita KC, Nepalese actress
- Kiran KC, Nepalese actor
- Rajani KC, Nepalese actress
- Sulakshana Khatri, Indian Bollywood actress
- Jiya KC, Nepalese and Bollywood actress and producer
- Uma Devi Khatri, late Indian Bollywood actress
- Jenisha KC, Nepalese actress
- Uttam KC, Nepalese actor and President of the Nepal Film Artists Association (FAAN)
- Naresh Kumar KC, Nepalese movie Director
- Dinesh KC, Nepalese actor
- Surendra KC, Nepalese actor
- Dipendra KC, Nepalese Director
- Himanchal Raj KC, winner of Mister Nepal 2025
- Dr. Khadga KC, Rector of Tribhuvan University
- Kul Prasad KC, Chief Minister of Lumbini Province of Nepal
- Karan KC, Nepalese cricketer at Nepal national cricket team
- Jit Bahadur K.C., first Nepalese athlete to win an international medal in sports (1971)
- Shreedhar Khatri, Nepalese Ambassador to the United States
- Sarala KC, President of Nepal Nursing Council
- Kamal Khatri, Nepalese singer
- Nilam K.C., former Minister of Women, Children and Senior Citizens of Nepal
- Sher Bahadur KC, former president of Nepal Bar Association
- Menuka Khand K.C., Deputy speaker of Lumbini Province
- Krishna Khatri, Nepalese football player of national women's team
- Jagat Bahadur KC, Vice-Chancellor of Purbanchal University
- Sajan KC, Nepalese entomologist
- Rajendra Kumar KC, former minister of Nepal and leader of Nepali Congress Party
- Dr. Badri KC, former President of Non Resident Nepali Association (NRNA)
- Man Prasad Khatri, Nepalese politician and former Member of Parliament
- Neelam KC, president of Women's International League for Peace and Freedom (WILPF-Nepal)
- Phupu Lhamu Khatri (born 1996), Nepalese Olympic judoka
- Buddhi Bahadur KC, Executive Director of state-owned Radio Nepal
- Hira Chandra KC, State Minister of Health and Population of Nepal
- Bedraj KC, Vice-Chancellor of Pokhara University
- Bal Bahadur K.C., former minister of Nepal
- Sunil KC, Chief Executive Officer (CEO) of NMB Bank Nepal
- Rajiv Khatri, Nepalese journalist and Member of Parliament, Pratinidhi Sabha
- Ramesh Kumar KC, former chairman of Agricultural Development Bank of Nepal.
- Manoj Kumar KC, band member of 1974 AD
- Dr. Fatta Bahadur KC, former chairman of National Insurance Board of Nepal (Rastriya Beema Sansthan)
- Indra Bahadur Khatri, Nepalese politician
- Dhruba KC, former coach of Nepal national football team
- Roshan KC, former chairman of Machhapuchhre Bank Ltd
- Kamala Sen-Khatri, Nepalese language activist
- Hema Belbase KC, Nepalese politician
- Dipak Bahadur K.C., member of the 1st Nepalese Constituent Assembly
- Bhagawati Khatri, Nepalese sport shooter at the 2000 Olympics
- Anjan KC, national football player of Nepal
- Rupesh KC, national football player of Nepal
- Sushil KC, national football player of Nepal
- Gyanu K.C., former Parliamentarian of Nepal
- Sunil K.C., politician (Rastriya Swatantra Party) and Member of Parliament from Kathmandu
- Dharmaraj K.C., politician (Rastriya Swatantra Party) and Member of Parliament
- Jagadiswor Narsingh KC, Nepalese politician and former member of Constituent Assembly

== Fictional characters ==
- Fenisha Khatri, in the British television series Casualty
- Captain Madan KC, in the Hollywood movie Everest based on real life story of Lieutenant Colonel Madan Khatri Chhetri (KC) of Nepal Army

== See also ==
- Khatri (surname)
- Khatri, a caste originating from the Malwa and Majha areas of Punjab region of the Indian Subcontinent
