= List of insurance companies in Nepal =

Insurance companies in Nepal are regulated by Nepal Beema Pradhikaran (Nepal Insurance Authority), an arm of Nepal Government's Ministry of Finance. As of May 2026, a total of 37 insurance companies are offering Life, Non-Life (General), Micro and Reinsurance services.

== Life Insurance Companies ==
As of February 2026, 14 life insurance companies are in operation in Nepal:

S.N	Life Insurance Company	Operating Since	Website
1	Rastriya Jeevan Beema Company Limited	2025 B.S (1969 A.D)	link
2	National Life Insurance Company Limited	2044 B.S (1988 A.D.)	link
3	Nepal Life Insurance Company Limited	2058 B.S (2001 A.D)	link
4	Prabhu Mahalaxmi Life Insurance Limited	2080 B.S (2023 A.D)	link
5	Life Insurance Corporation (Nepal) Limited	2057 B.S (2000 A.D)	link
6	MetLife (ALICO)	2058 B.S (2001 A.D)	link
7	SuryaJyoti Life Insurance Company Limited	2079 B.S (2023 A.D)	link
8	Himalayan Life Insurance Limited	2080 B.S (2023 A.D)	link
9	Asian Life Insurance Company Limited	2064 B.S (2008 A.D)	link
10	IME Life Insurance Company Limited	2074 B.S (2017 A.D)	link
11	Reliable Nepal Life Insurance Company Limited	2074 B.S (2017 A.D)	link
12	Sanima Reliance Life Insurance Limited	2079 B.S (2023 A.D)	link
13	Citizen Life Insurance Limited	2074 B.S (2017 A.D)	link
14	Sun Nepal Life Insurance Company Limited	2074 B.S (2017 A.D)	link

At one time, there were 19 life insurance companies in Nepal. To reduce the number of companies, Nepal Beema Pradhikaran introduced a new minimum capital requirement. Due to the new requirement of NRs.5 Arba (NRs. 5 Billion), the following companies underwent mergers:

1. Surya Life Insurance Company Limited and Jyoti Life Insurance Company Limited merged to form SuryaJyoti Life Insurance Company Limited.
2. Sanima Life Insurance Limited and Reliance Life Insurance Limited merged to form Sanima Reliance Life Insurance Limited.
3. Union, Prime and Gurans Life Insurance Company Limited merged to form Himalayan Life Insurance Limited.
4. Prabhu and Mahalaxmi Life Insurance Company Limited merged to form Prabhu Mahalaxmi Life Insurance Limited.

Additionally, Rastriya Beema Sansthan was converted into Rastriya Jiban Beema Company Limited on the 21st of Kartik, 2080 (7 November 2023) due to a regulatory requirement set out in Insurance Act 2079.

== Non-life (General) Insurance Companies ==
As of May 2026, 14 non-life insurance are operating in Nepal:

S.N	Non-Life Insurance Company	Operating Since	Website
1	Nepal Insurance Company Limited	2004 B.S (1947 A.D)	link
2	The Oriental Insurance Company Limited	2012 B.S (1956 A.D)	link
3	National Insurance Company Limited	2030 B.S (1974 A.D)	link
4	Himalayan Everest Insurance Company Limited	2079 B.S (2022 A.D)	link
5	United Ajod Insurance Company Limited	2080 B.S (2023 A.D)	link
6	Neco Insurance Limited	2051 B.S (1994 A.D)	link
7	Sagarmatha Lumbini Insurance Company Limited	2079 B.S (2023 A.D)	link
8	Prabhu Insurance Limited	2053 B.S (1996 A.D)	link
9	IGI Prudential Insurance Limited	2080 B.S (2023 A.D)	link
10	Shikhar Insurance Company Limited	2061 B.S (2004 A.D)	link
11	NLG Insurance Limited	2054 B.S (1998 A.D)	link
12	Siddhartha Premier Insurance Limited	2050 B.S (1994 A.D)	link
13	Rastriya Beema Company Limited	2071 B.S (2015 A.D)	link
14	Sanima GIC Insurance Limited	2079 B.S (2022 A.D)	link

At one time, there were 20 non-life insurance companies in Nepal. To reduce the number of companies, Nepal Beema Pradhikaran introduced a new minimum capital requirement. Due to the new requirement of NRs.2.5 Arba (NRs. 2.5 Billion), the following companies underwent mergers:

1. Himalayan Insurance Company Limited and Everest Insurance Company Limited, to form Himalayan Everest Insurance Company Limited.
2. Sanima Insurance Company Limited and General Insurance Company Limited, to form Sanima GIC Insurance Company.
3. Siddhartha Insurance Limited and Premier Insurance Company Limited (Nepal), to form Siddhartha Premier Insurance Limited.
4. Sagarmatha and Lumbini Insurance Company Limited, to form Sagarmatha Lumbini Insurance Company Limited.
5. IME General Insurance Limited and Prudential Insurance Company Limited, to form IGI Prudential Insurance Limited.
6. United Insurance Company (Nepal) Limited and Ajod Insurance Company Limited, to form United Ajod Insurance Company Limited.

== Reinsurance Companies ==
As of May 2026, 2 reinsurance are operating in Nepal:

S.N	Reinsurance Company	Operating Since	Website
1	Nepal Reinsurance Company Limited	2071 B.S (2014 A.D)	link
2	Himalayan Reinsurance Limited	2077 B.S (2020 A.D)	link

== Microinsurance Companies ==
There are 3 micro life insurance companies which are listed below.

S.N	Micro Life Insurance Companies	Operating Since	Website
1	Crest Micro Life Insurance Limited	2080 B.S (2023 A.D)	link
2	Guardian Micro Life Insurance Limited	2080 B.S (2023 A.D)	link
3	Liberty Micro Life Insurance Limited	2080 B.S (2023 A.D)	link

There are 4 micro non-life insurance companies which are listed below.

S.N	Micro Non-Life (General) Insurance Companies	Operating Since	Website
1	Nepal Micro Insurance Company Limited	2080 B.S (2023 A.D)	link
2	Protective Insurance Company Limited	2080 B.S (2023 A.D)	link
3	Star Micro Insurance Company Limited	2080 B.S. (2023 A.D.)	link
4	Trust Micro Insurance Company Limited	2080 B.S. (2024 A.D.)	link
