= Kaji (Nepal) =

Old Nepalese high ranking official

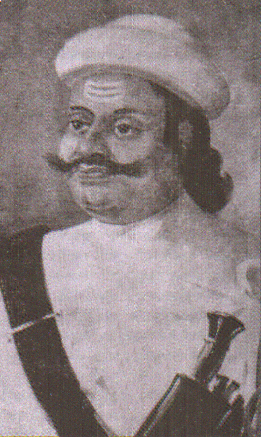
Kaji Vamshidhar Kalu Pande, Kaji of the Gorkha Kingdom and one of the widely known Kaji from Nepal

Kaji (Nepali: काजी) was a title and position used by nobility of Gorkha Kingdom (1559–1768) and Kingdom of Nepal between 1768 and 1846. During the era of King Prithvi Narayan Shah, the primary high-ranking titles given to close advisors and commanders were Chautariya, Kaji, and Sardar hajuriya and even something rajguru like pandit ranganath paudyal 1846 the rank was given to Rana close members and by 1951 the rank has vanished and became some English ranks like general colonel or captain or even an lieutenant.

== Etymology ==
Historian Mahesh Chandra Regmi suggests that Kaji is derived from Sanskrit word Karyi which meant functionary. The word Kaji can also be drived from middle eastern countries like when it is used when Muslims communities it is often spelled as Arabic word "Qadi" or persian word "Qazi" which means a judge who rules administrative justice or Japanese word Kanji.

== History ==
Gorkha was the Frist kingdom who use the title Kaji. Ganesh Pandey was the first Kaji under King Dravya Shah of Gorkha Kingdom. He helped Dravya Shah to become King of Gorkha and was later appointed Kaji of Gorkha (Note: The position of Kaji in Gorkha hill principality was not of only a mere minister but of the chief or prime minister.) in 1559 A.D. Also according to some sources darbya Shah lienge comes a man named bhupal Singh who came from india during an attack since Muslim rule over India so he knew the rank of Kaji. As fur the title is stayed to be lower mulkaji and Higher than Sardar and could be referred as General while some sources say when Mulkaji was formed it was gernal and Kaji was conerl and sardar was caption.Another significant Kaji of Gorkha was Kalu Pande born in the family of Ganesh Pande. He was son of Bhimraj Pande who was also a Kaji during the reign of King Nara Bhupal Shah. During Nara Bhupal Shah's reign, Kaji Biraj Thapa Magar also served as a highly important Gorkha Bhardar and the first Army Commander of Gorkha who successfully ascended the King to the throne. Kalu Pande led Gorkhalis in the Battle of Kirtipur. He had set up a base on Naikap, a hill on the valley's western rim, from where they were to mount their assaults on Kirtipur. He was killed in the battle after being surrounded by enemy forces. The ministers and officials of Kantipur Kingdom also had the title of Kaji. Following the defeat of Jayanta Rana Magar in 1744, Kashiram Thapa was a Kaji and army commander in the reign of King Jaya Prakash Malla.

Both as per Francis Buchanan-Hamilton and Dilli Raman Regmi, there were 4 Kajis forming the government in Nepal. In the rule of King Rana Bahadur Shah, 4 Kajis were appointed and were to work under the direction of King and Chautariya. The number of officers including Kajis changed after King Rana Bahadur abdicated in favour of his minor son Girvan Yuddha Bikram Shah. During the reign of Bhimsen Thapa, there were inner and outer circle of Kajis who acted as decision-making body and military commander and governors respectively. Kaji along with Chautariya and Bada Hakim were appointed to run the administration as governors. No single family had full dominance in the position of inner circle of government. All Thapas, Pandes and Basnets held similar shares in the inner circle.

=== Mulkaji ===
Chief (Mul) Kaji was considered equivalent to Prime Minister of Nepal before King Rana Bahadur Shah created the position of Mukhtiyar in 1806 and carried executive powers of nation to completely control Nepalese administration. Earlier, during the regency of Queen Rajendra Laxmi for the infant king Rana Bahadur Shah (1777–1778), Sarbajit Rana Magar served as the leading Kaji and de facto head of the administration prior to his execution in August 1778; historian Dilli Raman Regmi describes him as having been appointed Chief Kaji (Mulkaji), whereas Rishikesh Shaha notes that he held the rank of Kaji while heading the government. In 1794, King Rana Bahadur Shah came of age and appointed Kirtiman Singh Basnyat as Chief (Mul) Kaji among the newly appointed four Kajis though Damodar Pande was the most influential Kaji. Kirtiman had succeeded Abhiman Singh Basnyat as Chief Kaji. Kirtiman was secretly assassinated on 28 September 1801, by the supporters of Raj Rajeshwari Devi and his brother Bakhtawar Singh Basnyat, was then given the post of Chief (Mul) Kaji. Later Damodar Pande was appointed by Queen Rajrajeshwari as Chief Kaji. After the execution of Mulkaji Damodar Pande in March 1804, Ranajit Pande was appointed as Mulkaji (Chief Kaji) along with Bhimsen Thapa as second Kaji, Sher Bahadur Shah as Mul Chautariya and Ranganath Paudel as Raj Guru (Royal Preceptor).

== Institutional role ==
The Kaji was one of the principal offices within the Bharadari administrative system of the Gorkha Kingdom and later the Kingdom of Nepal. In Gorkha, the term referred to a ministerial office rather than simply a military rank. Prithvi Narayan Shah reorganized the Bharadari after his accession and appointed Kalu Pande as Kaji, while other senior offices included the Chautariya and Sardar.

The responsibilities associated with the office included advising the monarch, participating in the administration of the kingdom, organizing military affairs and overseeing provincial administration. During the eighteenth and early nineteenth centuries, Kajis could therefore exercise both political and military authority. The importance of the office increased as the Gorkhali state expanded and its administrative institutions became more complex.

By the late eighteenth century, the office had become part of a collective ministerial structure. During the regency of Queen Rajendra Laxmi for the infant king Rana Bahadur Shah (1777–1778), Sarbajit Rana Magar emerged as the leading Kaji and de facto head of the government prior to his execution in August 1778. Later, Rana Bahadur Shah appointed four Kajis to serve under the king and the Chautariya, while subsequent governments modified the number and relative authority of these officials. In 1794, Kirtiman Singh Basnyat was appointed Mulkaji, or chief Kaji, a position that became one of the most important offices in the central government before the creation of the Mukhtiyar system in 1806.

The office was consequently held by members of several prominent aristocratic families, including the Pandes, Thapas, Basnyats and other Chhetri and Magar courtiers, some of whom belonged to the original Tharghar (the six courtier families of the royal court) established under Dravya Shah, the first king of Gorkha. The early Shah Bharadari was dominated by Gorkhali Chhetri and Magar courtiers. The history of the Kaji therefore provides an important lens through which to understand the development of Nepal's court politics, military administration and centralized state institutions during the eighteenth and early nineteenth centuries.

== List of people with title Kaji ==
- Biraj Thapa Magar (Kaji of Gorkha, the 'King Maker' and the first Chief of Gorkhali Army, 18th century)
- Ram Krishna Thapa Magar (Kaji of Gorkha , after biraj thapa magar died in 1721 he was is son biraj thapa magar)
- Jayant Rana Magar (Kaji and Gorkhali General for both the Gorkha Kingdom and Kantipur during the 18th century)
- Sarbajit Rana Magar (Mulkaji (Chief Kaji) and Prominent Minister in Nepal during the 18th century)
- Abhiman Singh Rana Magar (Kaji Mulki Dewan, General and Minister of Nepal)
- Bandhu Rana Magar (Kaji, brother of Mulkaji Sarbajit Rana Magar, key courtier and military strategist who served under Queen Regent Rajendra Laxmi during the crucial phases of Nepal's unification campaigns, 18th century)
- Deva Dutta Thapa Magar (Kaji, influential military commander who held high-ranking political status and managed critical state affairs under Queen Regent Rajendra Laxmi in the 18th century)
- Bhimsen Thapa (1st Prime Minister of Nepal-Kaji/Dewan during the 19th century)
- Swarup Singh Karki (2nd Prime Minister of Nepal-Kaji/Dewan)
- Abhiman Singh Basnet (Mulkaji)
- Dhokal Singh Basnyat (Kaji)
- Bakhtawar Singh Basnyat (Mulkaji)
- Karbir Khatri (Kaji), entourage of first Nepalese mission to Europe
- Shiva Narayan Khatri (Kaji)
- kajiraj Chitrodhan Narsingh Gurung ("Kajiraj" title given by Shah kings, friend of PN Shah and fight with 78 kilo sword by one hand against traitors and predators, first kaji to start "Digvijay Pratha")
- Suryaman Singh Gurung (kaji, fought with Amar Singh Thapa for khas and Gorkha Unity)
- Narsingh Gurung (kaji, taksariya later kaji by Rana Bahadur Shah)
- Kaji Jhagal Singh Gurung (Thakur Saheb /Thaku title given by PN Shah for killing Parshuram Thapa, many padey Basnyats Mahara Mahat Kunwar Rayamajhi Khadka Karki Kalikote Budhathoki Raskoti Bam pal Sen Thapa for betraying and trying to defeat PN Shah, title of "One man army" "Son of Kali", weapon/khukuri given by PN Shah to kill betrayals of Gorkha kingdom alone by himself, Cousion of Kajiraj Chitrodhan Singh Gurung)
- Bansha Raj Gurung (kaji fought against British with Balbhadra kunwar, Amar Singh Thapa, Bhakti Thapa, Ujir Singh Thapa)
- Banshu Gurung (Kaji, first Sardar later Kaji, first warrior to fight with Khukuri against Captain kinloch in Sindhuli Gadhi with Birbhadra Upadhyaya, Harsha Pant)
- Kajiraj Bhobeswor Singh Gurung (MulKaji, first appointed him then later another to fought with Captain Kinloch then immediately come back in Gorkha for another region Palpa, later known as "Mul-Jimmawal" or kendriya "Mul-Jimmawal khalak" of Tanahun District in Jaspur and Lakuribot. Kaji Banshu Gurung and Kaji Bhobeswor Singh Gurung were In-Laws. Both are from different clans "Yoza" and "Ghotane" )
- Kehar Singh Basnyat (Kaji)
- Kirtiman Singh Basnyat (Mulkaji)
- Shivaram Singh Basnyat (Senapati Kaji)
- Gagan Singh Bhandari (Kaji)
- Ram Krishna Kunwar (Kaji Jethabudha)
- Bal Narsingh Kunwar (Kaji)
- Jung Bahadur Kunwar (Kaji, later Prime Minister)
- Damodar Pande (Mulkaji)
- Kalu Pande (Kaji of Gorkha)
- Bamsa Raj Pande (Dewan Kaji)
- Rana Jang Pande (Kaji later Mukhtiyar)
- Gajianesh Pandey (Kaji of Gorkha)
- Kaji Manik Lal Rajbhandari (Bada Kaji)
- Amar Singh Thapa (Sanukaji)
- Amar Singh Thapa Chhetri (Badakaji)
- Bhimsen Thapa (Kaji later Mukhtiyar)
- Mathabarsingh Thapa (Kaji later Mukhtiyar)
- Nain Singh Thapa (Kaji General)
- Ranabir Singh Thapa (Kaji General)
- Ranadhoj Thapa (Kaji)
- Kashiram Thapa (Kaji of Kantipur)
- Bada Kaji Mariach man Singh Pradhan ( he was a Kaji and later Bada Kaji of Nepal during Rana era he was an education pioneer of Nepal because in 1917 on acting if behalf he took leading an crossponding and had secured the official application of historic Durbar High school and Nepal Frist propose campus under Patna university and this has lead to the foundation Tri Chandra college he was alsa good in foreign diplomacy and was heavinly involved in managing good relationships with British India and Republic of China and had foreign bureaucrats assisting the prime minister of nepal and lead the Munshi Khana addha which serves as foreign minister before the rank was created in 1948.
- Bada Kaji Ratna man Singh shrestha (he was Kaji of Nepal during Rana era)
- Bada Kaji Pushpa Raj rajbandari( he was Kaji of Rana era
- Bada Kaji Manik all rajbandari( he was Kaji)
- Birdhwaj Basnet(a Kaji of Nepal and son bakhtawar Singh Basnet he was Kaji until 1846 where he fell in Bhandarkal parva)
- Sri Sri sri adirajkumar Jayanta Shah( Kaji of Gorkha son of rudra Shah who became Sri Kaji Chautariya )
- Sri Kaji jiv Shah(Kaji of Gorkha he was the grandson of chandrarup shah and was the son Vishnurup Shah)
- naryan Singh bohara(a Kaji of Nepal from Nepali list of Kaji )
- Parshuram thapa ( Kaji of kantipur and brother of kashirm thapa )

== List of people with the name Kaji ==
Kaji was also used as given name and middle name. Notable Nepalese people with first name and middle name Kaji:

- Chin Kaji Shrestha, Nepalese politician
- Kaji Man Samsohang, Nepalese politician
- Narayan Kaji Shrestha, Nepalese politician
- Nati Kaji, Nepalese singer
- Purna Kaji Tamrakar, Nepalese merchant and journalist
- Raju Kaji Shakya, Nepalese footballer and coach.
- KAZI dai a nick name of hari sharn Nepali given by his friends Dr Parasar narayan Suwal and also used by Dr Parasar narayan Suwal son Rajendra narsingh Suwal. KAZI dai was an birder and an ornithologist and while returning to pokhra had discovered 13 new species of bird and has also walked with US president Jimmy carter he died in 2021 and had aspo from bird conversation Nepal and Karna shahkya in 1982.

== See also ==
- Mukhtiyar
- Senapati
- Sardar
- Kaji Pratha, a social practice of offering Kaji title to Thakuri, Gurung, Magar, khas caste
- Mukhiya: A village or local revenue headman responsible for collecting land taxes and maintaining community records

== Bibliography ==
- Acharya, Baburam (2012), Acharya, Shri Krishna (ed.), Janaral Bhimsen Thapa : Yinko Utthan Tatha Pattan (in Nepali), Kathmandu: Education Book House, p. 228, ISBN 9789937241748
- Joshi, Bhuwan Lal; Rose, Leo E. (1966), Democratic Innovations in Nepal: A Case Study of Political Acculturation, University of California Press, p. 551
- Pradhan, Kumar L. (2012), Thapa Politics in Nepal: With Special Reference to Bhim Sen Thapa, 1806–1839, New Delhi: Concept Publishing Company, p. 278, ISBN 9788180698132
- Karmacharya, Ganga (2005), Queens in Nepalese Politics: an account of roles of Nepalese queens in state affairs, 1775–1846, Nepal: Educational Publishing House, ISBN 9789994633937
- Shrestha, Tulsi Narayan (2005), Nepalese administration:a historical perspective, Ratna Pustak Bhandar, ISBN 9789993304784
- Wright, Daniel (1877), History of Nepal, Asian Educational Services, ISBN 9788120605527
- Khatri, Shiva Ram (1999), Nepal Army Chiefs:Short Biographical Sketches, University of Michigan: Sira Khatri
- Paodel, Prabha Krishna; Āsā, Esa. Pī (2003), The founder of Modern Nepal Prithvinarayan Shah, Vaani Prakashan
