= Arjun Karki =

Nepali diplomat

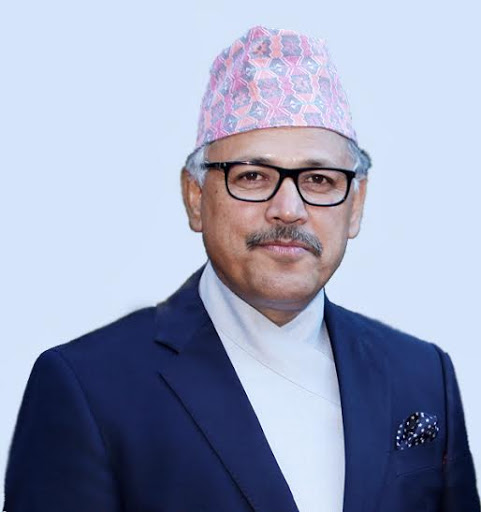

Ambassador of Nepal to the United States
- In office May 2015 – February 2021
- President: Ram Baran Yadav; Bidya Devi Bhandari
- Prime Minister: Sushil Koirala; Khadga Prasad Sharma Oli; Pushpa Kamal Dahal; Sher Bahadur Deuba
- Preceded by: Shankar Prasad Sharma
- Succeeded by: Yuba Raj Khatiwada

Personal details
- Born: 22 July 1963 (age 63) Sankhuwasabha, Nepal
- Education: Tribhuvan University (BSc); University of Manchester Institute of Science and Technology
- Website: http://www.arjunkarki.org/

Arjun Kumar Karki (Nepali: अर्जुन कार्की; born July 22, 1963) is a Nepali development practitioner who served as the Ambassador of Nepal to the United States from 2015 to 2021. As the residential ambassador of Nepal to the US, he also served as the non-residential ambassador to Panama, Costa Rica, Mexico, El Salvador, Honduras, and Guatemala.

He graduated from Tribhuvan University with a B.Sc. in Agricultural Economics in 1990, and subsequently completed M.Sc. in Management and Implementation of Development Projects at the University of Manchester Institute of Science and Technology in 1995, and a PhD entitled "The Politics of Poverty and Movements from Below in Nepal" from the University of East Anglia in 2001. He has championed the cause of democracy in the country and has worked towards promotion of human rights and sustainable development.

He has been president of Rural Reconstruction Nepal since 1989, and the international co-ordinator of LDC Watch since 2004. In 2011, he was awarded the Justice and Peace Award by the Bishop Tji Hak-Soon Justice and Peace Foundation based in South Korea, for his exceptional contribution to the protection of the human rights and the development of impoverished and marginalised communities in Nepal and in other LDCs.
