= Shanker Sumsher Jung Bahadur Rana =

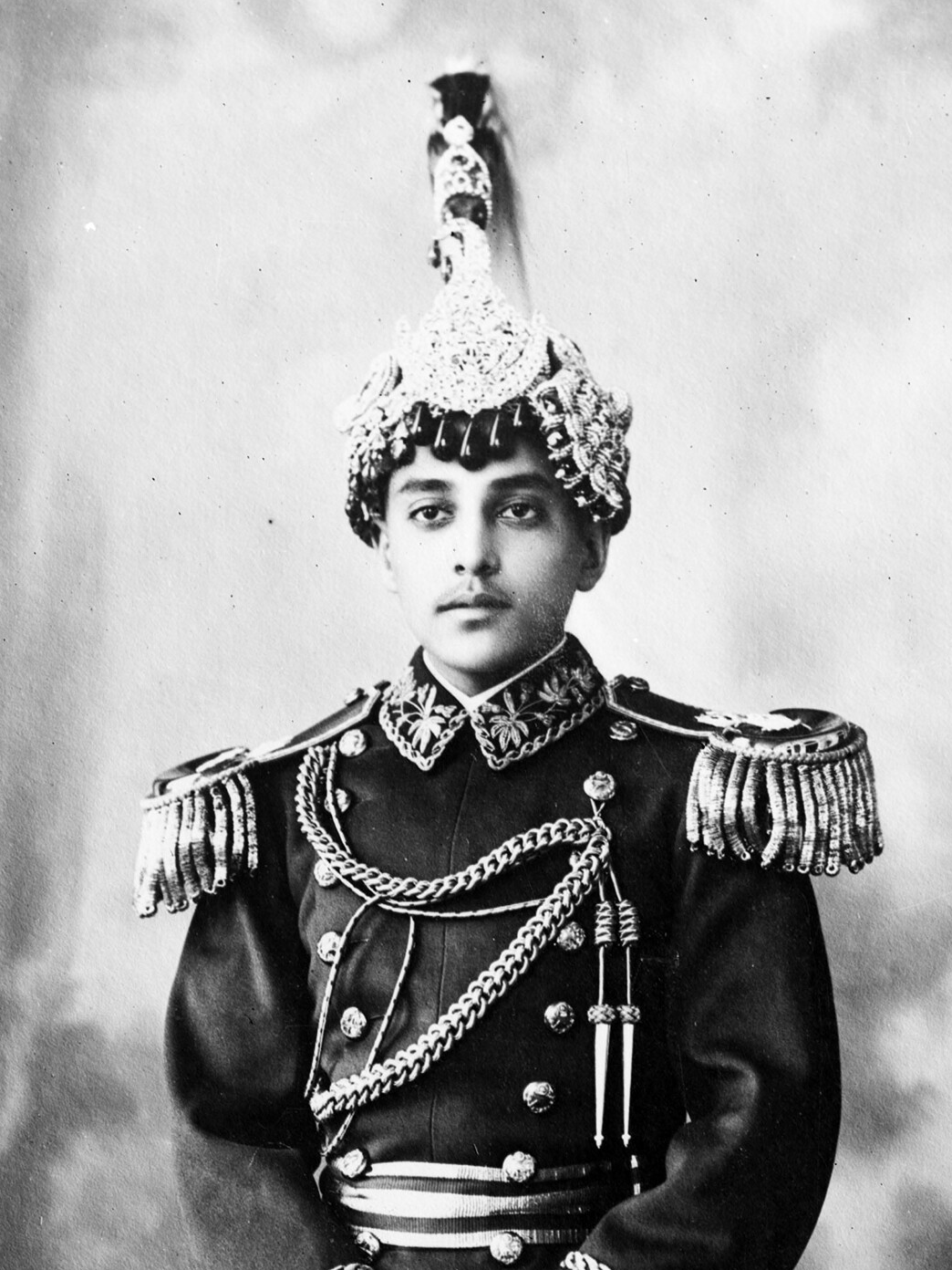
- Shanker Sumsher in the 1920s

Nepalese Ambassador to the Court of St James's
- In office 1949–1954
- Preceded by: Kaiser Shumsher Jang Bahadur Rana
- Succeeded by: Daman Sumsher Jung Bahadur Rana

Nepalese Ambassador to the United States
- In office September 27, 1949 – 1954
- Preceded by: Subba Iswary Raj Misra
- Succeeded by: Rishikesh Shah

Nepalese Ambassador to France Ambassade du Népal en France
- In office January 28, 1950 – 1954

Personal details
- Born: January 1, 1909 Singha Durbar, Kathmandu
- Died: 4 June 1976 (aged 67)
- Parent: Bada Maharani Bala Kumari (father)
- Education: Durbar High Sch. Kathmandu

Sir Shanker Sumsher Jung Bahadur Rana was a Nepali diplomat. He served as High Commissioner of Nepal to the Court of St. James and as ambassador to the United States, France and the Netherlands. His father Chandra Shumsher Jung Bahadur Rana was the Prime Minister of Nepal from the Rana dynasty.

== Life and career ==
Born 1909 at Singha Durbar, Kathmandu– 4 June 1976) General (GBE c 16 November 1949, KBE m 24 September 1946), He was son of Bada Maharani Bala Kumari and Chandra Shumsher Jung Bahadur Rana. He was educated at Durbar High Sch. Kathmandu.

In 1927 Rana was appointed Maj-Gen. From 1930 to 1931 he was acting Head Shrestra Kousal. From 1931 to 1934 he was Head of Madesh Report Nixari and 1947–1949 Kothamahal. From 1936 to 1943 he was Dir-Gen. PWD. In 1946 he was a member of the special diplomatic mission to confer the Order of Ojaswi Rajanya and the rank of Commanding-General to George VI.

From 1946 to 1947 Rana was Dir-Gen. Roads & Railways Dept. From 1947 to 1949 he was Dir-Gen. Police Dept. In 1948 he was promoted to the rank of General. From 1948 to 1949 he was ADC General & Chief of Staff to the Prime Minister.

From 1949 to 1954 Rana was Ambassador at the Court of St James's with concurrent accreditation to France, the United States and the Netherlands). In 1953 Rana attended the Coronation of Queen Elizabeth II in London 1953.
