= Nepal Insurance Authority =

- नेपाल बीमा प्राधिकरण
- Formation: 2026 B.S; 0 days' time
- Type: Regulatory Agency
- Headquarters: Kupondole, Lalitpur
- Key people: Janak Raj Sharma (Chairman); Susil Dev Subedi (Executive Director)
- Employees: 91 (2023)
- Website: nia.gov.np
- Formerly called: Beema Samiti बीमा समिती

Nepal Beema Pradhikaran (Nepal Insurance Authority) (Nepali:नेपाल बीमा प्राधिकरण) serves as the exclusive regulatory body tasked with structuring, overseeing, inspecting, and supervising the insurance industry in Nepal which is operating under the Ministry of Finance. The authority is Established as an autonomous institution under Section 3 of the Insurance Act, 2079 BS, the Authority holds a distinct legal status with perpetual succession. Its primary mandate is to foster a fair, competitive, reliable, and credible insurance market within Nepal. Additionally, the Authority is committed to protecting policyholders’ rights and interests through robust regulatory measures. To accomplish these goals, the Authority actively collaborates with national regulatory bodies, the private sector, relevant stakeholders, international organizations, and foreign counterparts. In addition, the Authority is founding member of the International Association of Insurance Supervisors.

The authority is headquartered in Lalitpur district and has six province offices in Karnali Province, Madhesh Province, Sudurpashchim Province, Gandaki Province, Lumbini Province & Koshi Province.

== History ==
Insurance business was started in Nepal by Nepal Bank's Maal Chalani Tatha Beema Company (translating to Transport and Insurance company) in 2004 B.S. Until 2026 B.S., the insurance business in Nepal was regulated by Nepal Government's Insurance Act, 1968 A.D. Feeling a need for effective regulation and control of insurance business, Nepal Government took steps to establish a dedicated regulatory body.

The result of this initiative was Nepal Beema Samiti (Nepal Insurance Board), which was established on 2026 BS.

In 2079 B.S. (2022 A.D.), Nepal Beema Samiti was formally renamed Nepal Beema Pradhikaran following the enactment of the Insurance Act, 2079 B.S.

== Roles and responsibilities ==
As the official regulator of the insurance industry, Beema Pradhikaran undertakes the following roles and responsibilities:

- Representation of Nepal Government and its interests in the field of insurance.
- Formulate necessary bylaws, directives, guidelines, regulations and orders for the insurance business,
- Issue and manage licenses for the operation of insurance,
- Conduct or cause to conduct studies, researches, trainings, and required programs for the development and expansion of insurance,
- Act as a protector of policyholder's rights and interests,
- Act as a protector of insurance company's rights and interests.

== Organisation structure ==
The Authority is specifically governed by a board of directors appointed by the government of Nepal. The composition of the Board is:

- Chairperson: Appointed by Government of Nepal.
- Member: Joint Secretary, Ministry of Finance.
- Member: Joint Secretary, Ministry of Law, Justice and Parliamentary Affairs.
- Member: Life Insurance Expert.
- Member: Non-Life Insurance Expert.

The chairman is also the executive head of the authority. Under the chairman, there is one executive director and four directors.

The four directors lead the four corresponding departments of the company, which are:

1. Legal and Regulation Division
2. Human Resource and Insurance Policy Division
3. Supervision, Agriculture & Micro Insurance, Re-Insurance/Research Division
4. Management Information System and License Division

As of January 2023, there are a total of 91 employees in the authority.

== Laws and legislation ==
The authority is responsible for drafting the laws and legislation regarding insurance business in Nepal. For this purpose, the two principal laws introduced by Beema Pradhikaran are:

- Insurance Act, 2079 B.S
- Insurance Regulation, 1993 A.D

In addition to these, the authority also publishes different bylaws, circulars and directives related to specific parts of the insurance business.

== Insurance companies in Nepal ==
As of January 2023, there are 38 licensed insurance companies in Nepal operating under the Beema Pradhikaran. Among the 35 companies, 14 are life insurers, 14 are non-life insurers, 2 are re-insurers, 2 micro life insurance companies, and 3 micro non-life insurance companies. A detailed list of the companies can be found here: List of insurance companies in Nepal.

Beema Pradhikaran is also currently in the process of issuing licences to new micro-insurance companies in Nepal.

== See also ==
- List of financial supervisory authorities by country
