= Visit of Jung Bahadur Rana to Europe =

Visit of Jung Bahadur Rana to Europe (Afro-Eurasia)

In 1850, Jung Bahadur Rana visited Europe with the intention of estimating the military power of European countries. He was the first high-ranking person from South Asia to pay such a visit to European countries, due to which he gained a lot of media attention in Europe. As a result of his visit, Jung Bahadur was able to gain international recognition for Nepal as a sovereign nation.

== Travel from Nepal to England ==
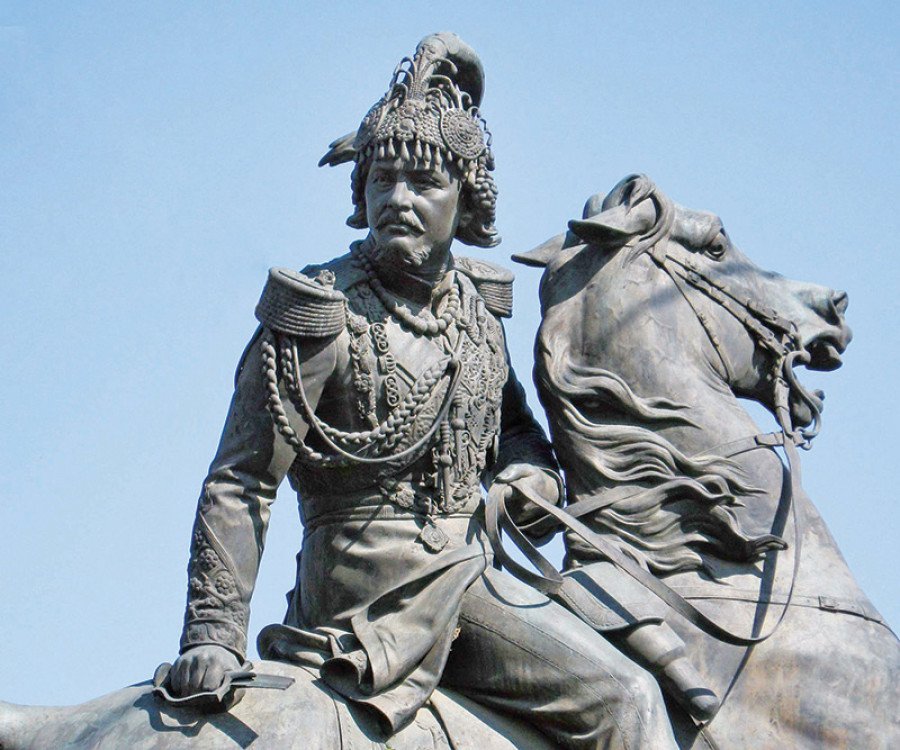
Statue of Jung Bahadur

The journey to Europe started on 4 Magh 1906 BS (January, 1850) from Kathmandu. They took the route of Chisapani to cross the border. On the way, Jung Bahadur captured four elephants, as well as killing four tigers and some deer. From Chisapani, they reached Kadarawana Gadhi where Jung Bahadur gave gifts to the local peasants. He crossed the border of present-day India and camped in the village of Dhaka. On the seventh day of his journey, he reached Patna.

=== Patna and Calcutta ===
Jung Bahadur received a 19-gun salute by an English senior official while staying at Mahila Sahib. They reached Calcutta via Sundarban in 11 days. On arrival at Calcutta, he was welcomed by a crowd of around 125,000 people, along with English civil officials. A band and gun salute were present at the event.

A feast was organized by the English governor general and in the following days a sight seeing tour of Calcutta was arranged to see the army camp, gardens and markets. He also visited Sri Jagannath temple where he donated NPR 1,000. After a few weeks, he took the SS Haddington steamship and set sail to Europe.

The ship was 300 ft long and 75 ft wide. It carried about 1,200 passengers. Each passenger had a bed and three meals a day. A band provided entertainment on board. There were four cannons in board to protect against pirates. Jung Bahadur listened to Englishman's conversation and watched passengers dance on the ship. For entertainment, he shot about 300 rounds from his rifle every day to hit a bottle hung from the mast, sometimes competing with Englishmen. He even milked cows by himself to prevent impure food from entering his body.

They refilled the board with supplies when they reached Chinapattan (modern Madras). He visited the local area before leaving for Ceylon (current Sri Lanka).

=== Stop in Ceylon ===
Upon reaching Ceylon, he was received by a gun salute and band. A parade was held in his honour. He visited the forests and markets of Sri Lanka. After two days in Ceylon, they sailed to the island of Aden.

=== Stop in Aden, Egypt, and Malta ===
After 8 days, they reached Aden, where he was received by an English garrison, including a general and a colonel. He noticed Aden was a rocky island without any green vegetation. From there, they travelled to Egypt, arriving in eight days. Using six-horsed carriages, they reached Cairo. They sailed along the Nile river from Faroja and reached Alexandria. He met the Wāli there. The Wāli presented a large quantity of food for Jung Bahadur's travels.

After sailing for seven days from Alexandria, they stopped briefly in Malta. They then travelled to Gibraltar in three days. The ship stopped there for about five hours before they sailed to England.

== In Britain ==
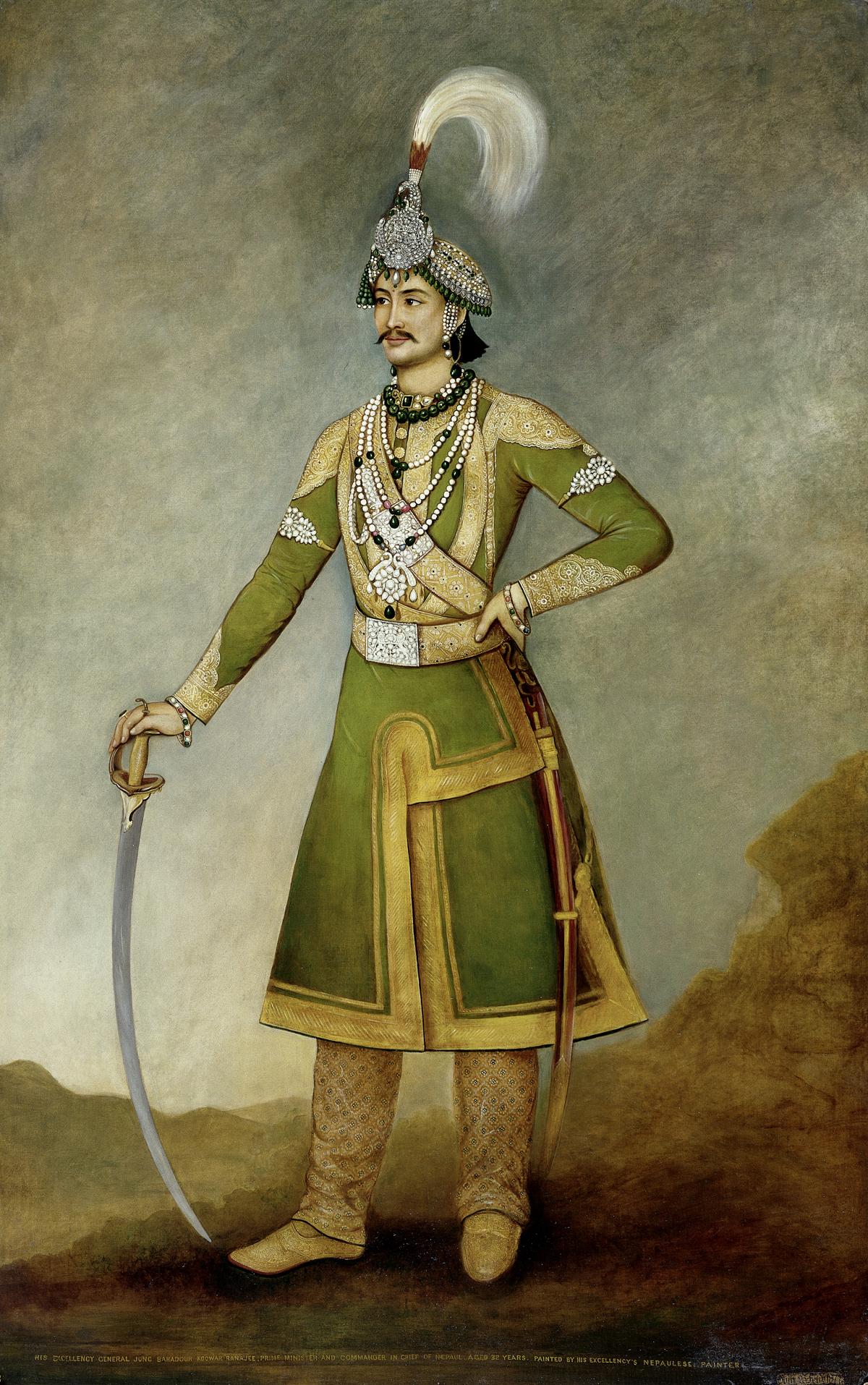
Portrait by Bhajuman Chitrakar, 1849. Given to the East India Company by the sitter in 1850, in London. It later hung in the office of the Foreign Secretary until removed by Jack Straw, & allocated to the British Library, where it remains

Jung Bahadur landed in Southampton, England. There, a local customs officer asked him to open his baggage. Feeling insulted, Jung Bahadur threatened to take the next steamer back to Alexandria. However, they resolved the argument in an office house of P&O Shipping Company. This misunderstanding happened because although a message had been sent, no house had been secured for him in advance. Jung Bahadur sent Lieutenant Lal Singh Khatri and an English man he hired in Calcutta to London to check if proper arrangements had been made for the reception. The two men confirmed and telegraphed back. He then boarded a train and reached London on 26 May 1850. Lord John Russell came to welcome him whilst he was stationed at the Richmond Terrace, in the bank of the River Thames.

Jung Bahadur and his team visited all the major state functionaries and made a detailed account. They noted the duties and functions of the prime minister, the commander in chief, the parliament, and the common people.

=== Meeting with Queen Victoria ===
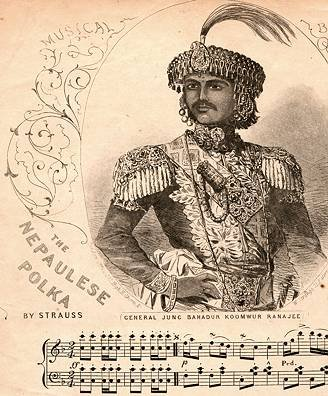
A portrait of Jung Bahadur made in London, 1850

On 19 June, Jung Bahadur met Queen Victoria at St James's Palace. He gave her a letter from the King of Nepal.

On the following day, around 1,500 noble men gathered in the palace to welcome Jung Bahadur.

Three days later, the Queen invited him to watch the dance performance of a group of young girls at Her Majesty's Theatre. Admission was one Mohar. After seeing the dance, Jung Bahadur tipped the young girls 1,500 NPR.

They also went to Vauxhall Gardens where they were received with a gun salute. Jung Bahadur attracted a crowd there due to his attire and jewellery. Many women touched him, which is considered non-holy in Hinduism.

=== Jung Bahadur's time in Britain ===
Jung Bahadur took part in Epsom races on 29 May, where he was invited to attend a demonstration of balloon flight. They saw the demonstrations in Vauxhall between 22 June and 5 July. On 6 July he attended a regatta on the Thames.

On 29 July, Jung Bahadur visited Plymouth by train. A garrison of four regiments greeted him with a 19-gun salute. There, they attended a dance event in the city centre. They also observed ship construction.

Jung Bahadur opened an account for purchasing guns and on the same day purchased 23 firearms to arm the high-ranking members of his team. Later, he purchased more guns, with the total . The total gun purchase amounted to around 345,000 NPR. Some of these guns were used in the Nepal-Tibet war.

By 2 August, they reached Birmingham, where they observed metalwork and the manufacturing of weapons.

The British media reported the Nepali ritual of bathing in the open with a loincloth, and their refusal to eat cooked food of any kind at the functions they were invited to. They used to cook and eat with great care as they could lose their caste by intermixing with the foreigners.

=== Departure from England ===
On 14 August 1850 (6 Bhadra 1907 BS), Jung Bahadur sailed to France. The queen, commander in chief, and other high-ranking officials said goodbye to the crew. The queen also reminded him to write a letter when he returned to Nepal.

== In France ==
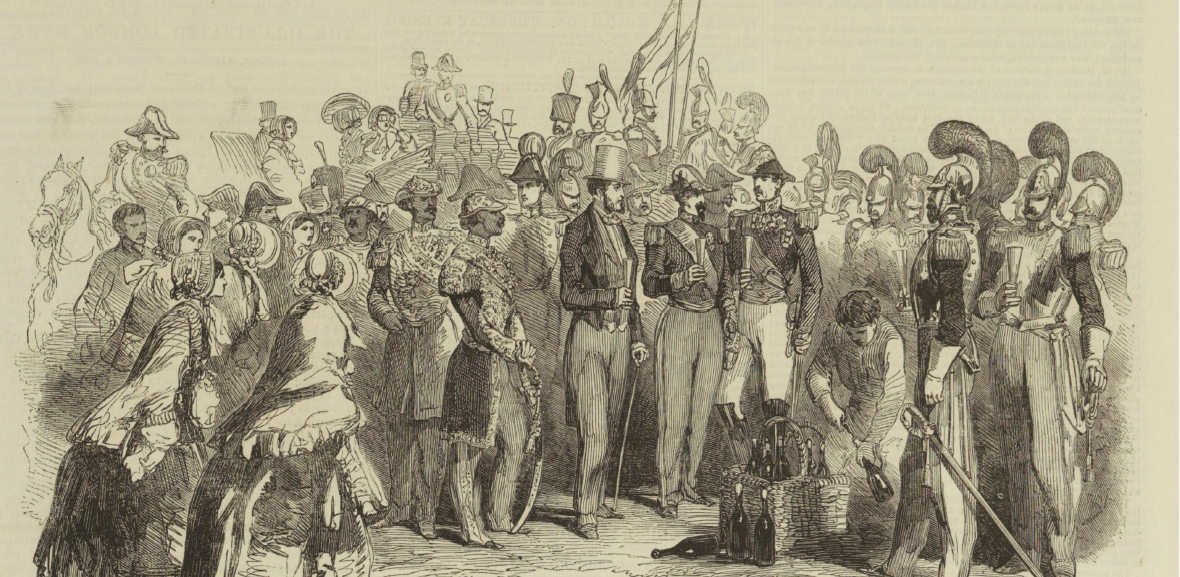
Illustration of the Jung Bahadur Rana's visit in Paris in 1850

The sea was rough when they sailed from England to France. They arrived within a day of their departure and spent the night in a hotel near the coast. The next day, they boarded a train to Paris. They were stationed at Hotel Sinet on Rue du Faubourg Saint-Honoré. The team was escorted by Prince Bacchicochi, the first cousin once-removed of Louis Napoleon. The next day, Prince Bacchicochi took Jung Bahadur for a sightseeing tour of Paris. He bought various artefacts in Paris worth 50,000 NPR.

On 30 August, Jung Bahadur met with President Louis Napoleon. They discussed the strength of the French Armed Forces and its policies.

In the next few days, they were invited to various palaces. On the suggestion of Napoleon, Jung Bahadur visited Fontainebleau which was about 45 miles from Paris, where they observed the newly restored palace together. They also went to Versailles, which had been recently turned into a museum by Louis-Philippe in 1837.

Louis Napoleon asked Jung Bahadur if he had any requests. He asked if he could see a parade of 900,000 troops. After discussing with the French nobles, Napoleon decided that calling 900,000 would cause a problem. Instead, a parade of 50,000 was arranged. Cavalry and infantry were brought from nearby barracks to pay gun salute to Jung Bahadur.

A sword was presented to Jung Bahadur as a souvenir by Napoleon.

He left Paris on 1 October. They reached the seaport city of Marseille on 4 October and set sail back to Egypt four days later.

== Returning through India and Sri Lanka ==
They travelled across the Suez Isthmus and Aden before reaching Bombay. On the way, they also observed some volcanoes.

On reaching Bombay, they were received by the British governor. There, they rested for 8 days, before making a pilgrimage to Dwarka. They left on 14 November and reached Dwarka on 16 November before returning to Bombay on 21 November. At Dwarka, Jung Bahadur made a large donation in promissory notes which could be indirectly paid by the British government.

Next, they travelled along the Gulf of Mannar. Kaji Dilli Singh Basnet got seriously sick due to rough seas. On route, they stopped at Colombo, where they were received by Sir George Anderson, the governor of Sri Lanka. The ship they sailed to Colombo was damaged due to rough sea, so a new ship was arranged to travel to Ramnathi. The main reason to visit Ramnathi was for purification which would free Jung Bahadur from impurities and contamination gathered at the foreign land. At Ramnathi, he donated 5,000 NPR. The next day, they returned to Colombo. On 8 December, they embarked to Calcutta, arriving on 19 December.

Laurence Oliphant joined them in Sri Lanka and accompanied them to Nepal. Oliphant later published a diary describing Nepal.

=== Stop at Benares ===
They stayed in Benares for 10 days as a guest of Maharaja Ishwari Prasad Narayan Singh.

== Reception in Nepal ==
Jung Bahadur reached the Nepal border on 29 January 1851. After a brief hunt in Terai, he reached Kathmandu on 6 February 1851. He was received by a large crowd in Nepal. All major civil and military officials were present to receive him at the banks of the Bagmati River. For the occasion, Jung Bahadur wore a robe of white silk.

== Accompanying members ==
- Colonel Jagat Shamsher
- Colonel Dhir Shamsher
- Major Rana Mehar Adhikari
- Kaji Karbir Khatri
- Kaji Hemdal Thapa
- Kaji Dilli Singh Basnet
- Lieutenant Lal Singh Khatri
- Lieutenant Karbir Khatri
- Lieutenant Bheem Sen Rana
