= Kashiram Thapa =

Commander-in-Chief of Kantipur Kingdom

- काजी काशीराम थापा

Umrao of Nuwakot

Personal details
- Died: 1746 A.D. Gaurighat, Kathmandu

Military service
- Allegiance: Kantipur
- Rank: General, Commander-in-Chief
- Battles/wars: Battle of Nuwakot against Gorkha Kingdom

Kashiram Thapa (Nepali: काशीराम थापा) was the army commander of Jaya Prakash Malla. King Jagajjaya Malla had appointed him as Umrao of Nuwakot. He had wide control over Palanchok preventing Prithvi Narayan Shah to evade Bhadgaon. He was considered to be a courageous and ambitious person who was good in dealings and organizing. When Gorkhali king Prithvi Narayan Shah plundered Nuwakot, he was sent to defend the area. He lost the battle on 1746 AD and was thought of deceiving the Kantipur Kingdom. Previously, he had won the Naldum area from Gorkhali and gained the confidence of King Jaya Prakash. So, the King was confident on Kashiram as Prithvi Narayan Shah had on Kalu Pande. However Kashiram lost and got the King angry for which he was assassinated. His brother Parashuram Thapa sided to Gorkha Kingdom when his brother was killed without justification.
