= Gaurighat =

Coordinates: 27°42′50″N 85°20′58″E

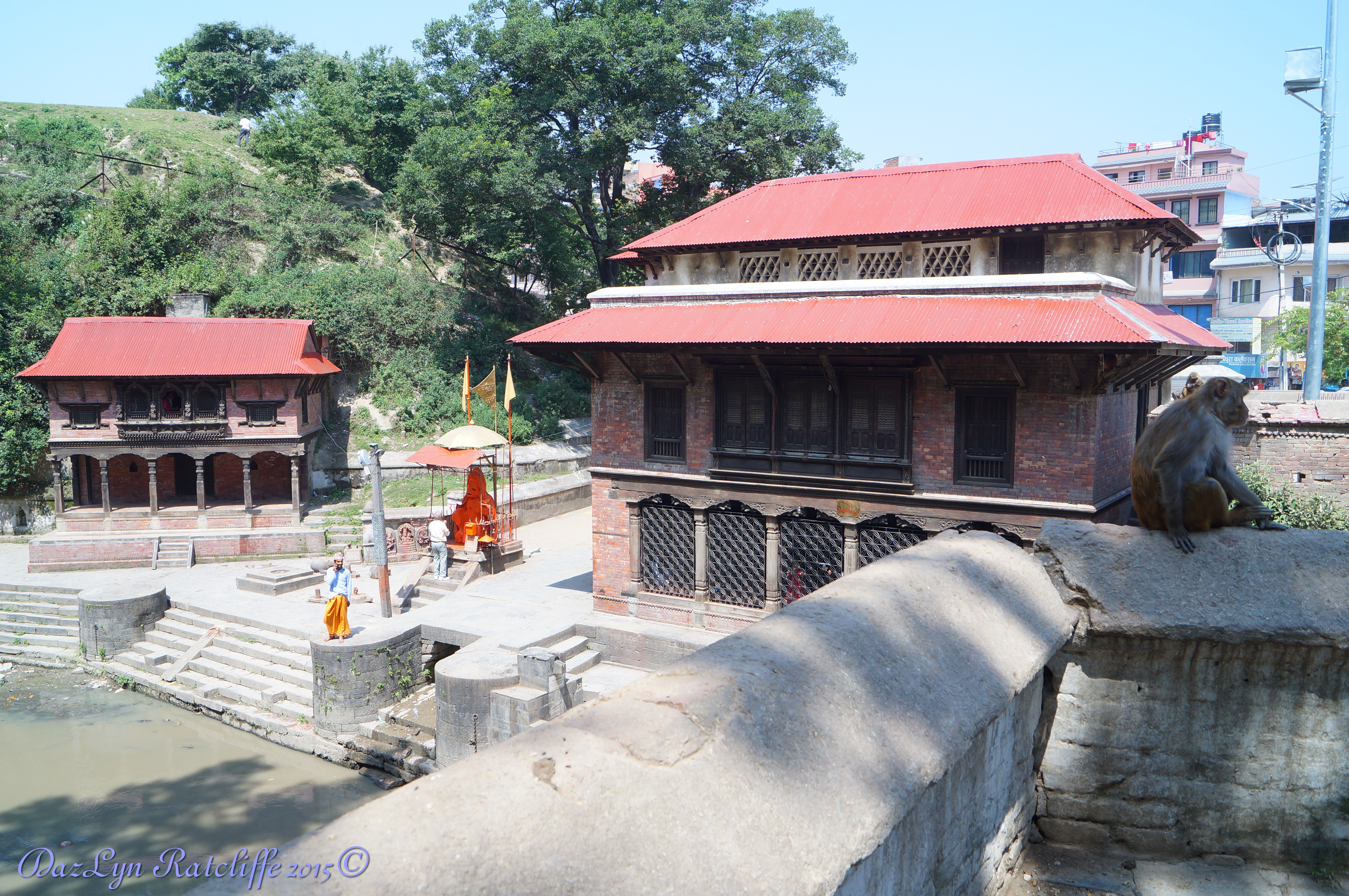
Gaurighat Sattal

Gaurighat (Nepali: गौरीघाट) is an ancient Nepalese city at the Bank of Bagmati river in the Kathmandu Valley. Now a part of the Kathmandu District, Gaurighat is located in the northern side of Pashupatinath temple. Gaurighat hosts temples of Goddess Parvati and Kiranteswar Mahadev, the Kirant incarnation of Lord Shiva. Lord Shiva is considered the principal deity of Nepalese Hindu cult. The shrine of Gaurighat consists of a Hanuman statue, a Ganesh statue and the most important of all - a statue of Goddess Parvati. The temple dedicated to Parvati is called the Guhyeshwari Temple.

The bank of Bagmati river - considered the holiest river within the Kathmandu Valley, was (and is) among the major river banks to cremate the dead of the Hindu believers. The cremation ground is commonly referred to as Aryaghat.

== Galleries ==
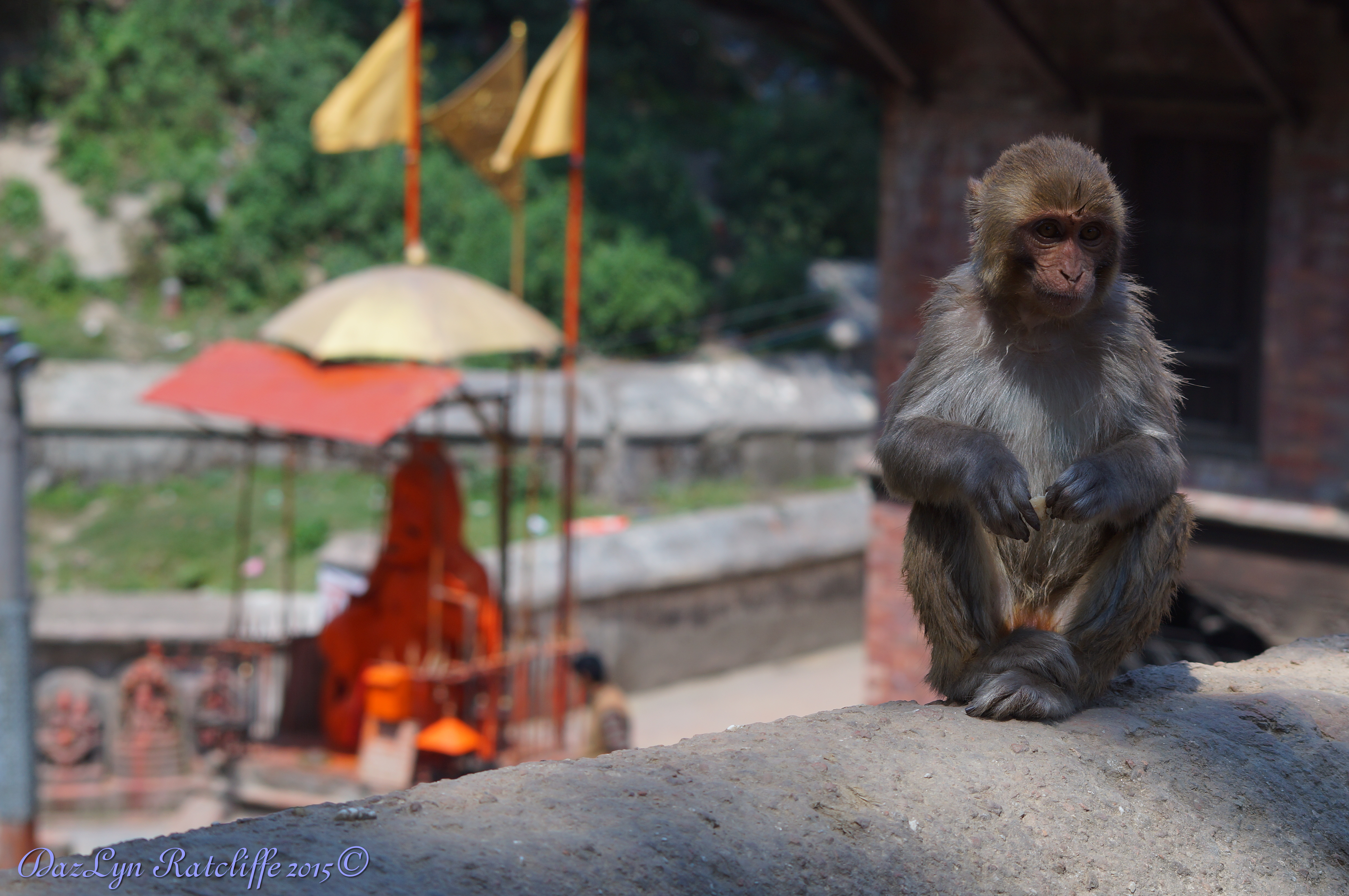
Monkey on the walk way Bridge at Gaurighat on the Bagmati River, Kathmandu, Nepal

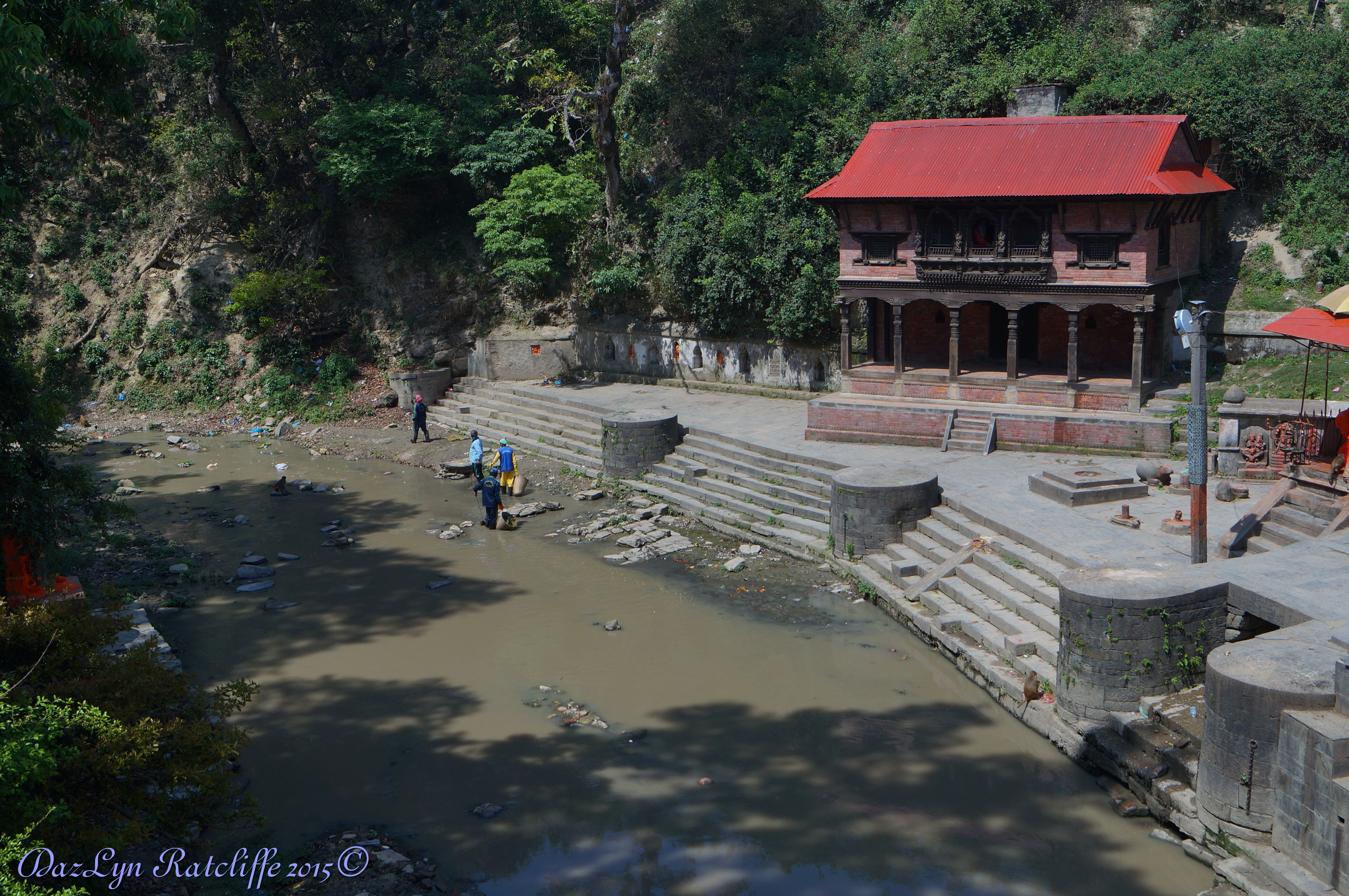
Gaurighat on the Bagmati River in Kathmandu, Nepal

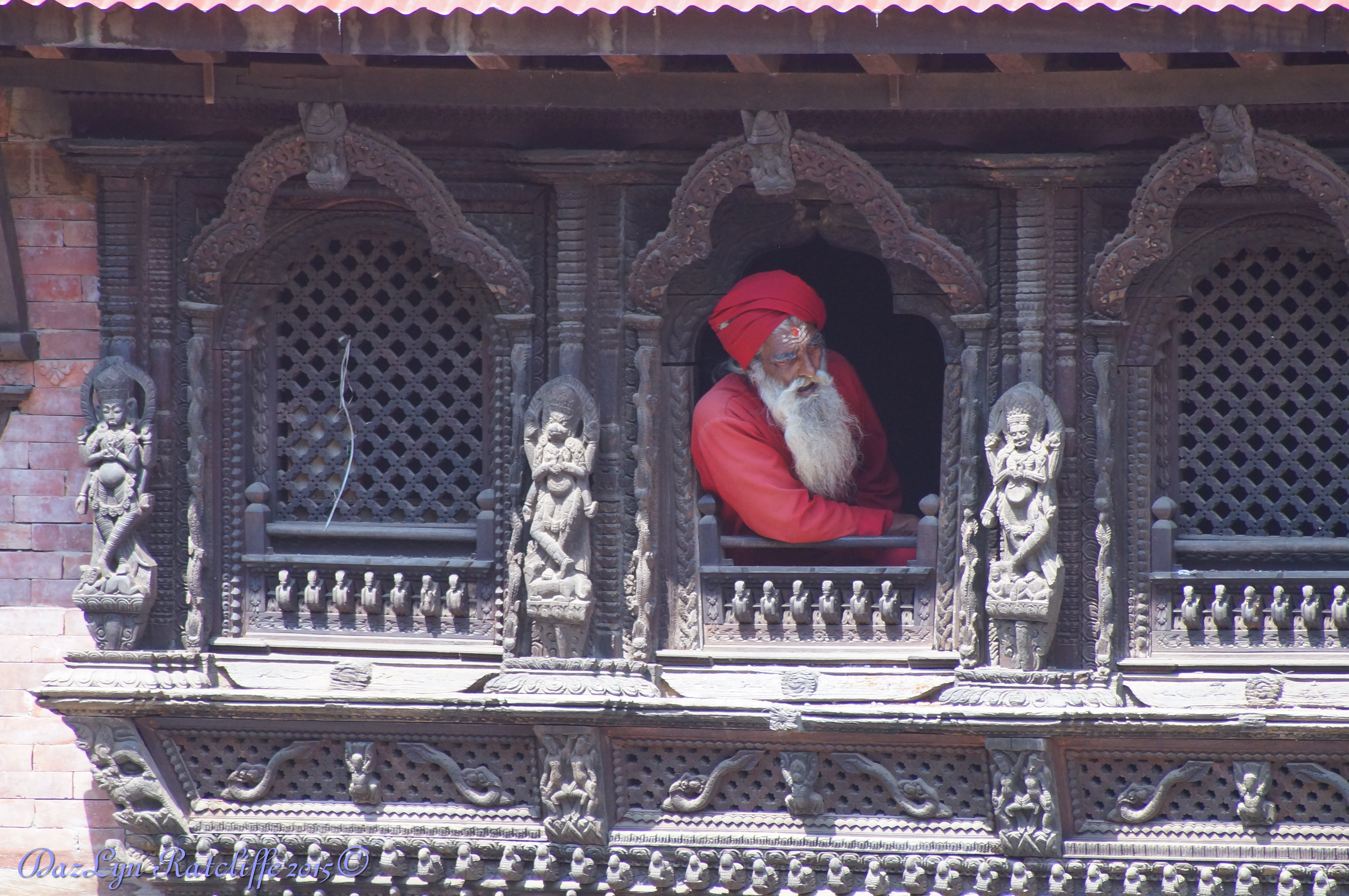
Local Hindu Temple

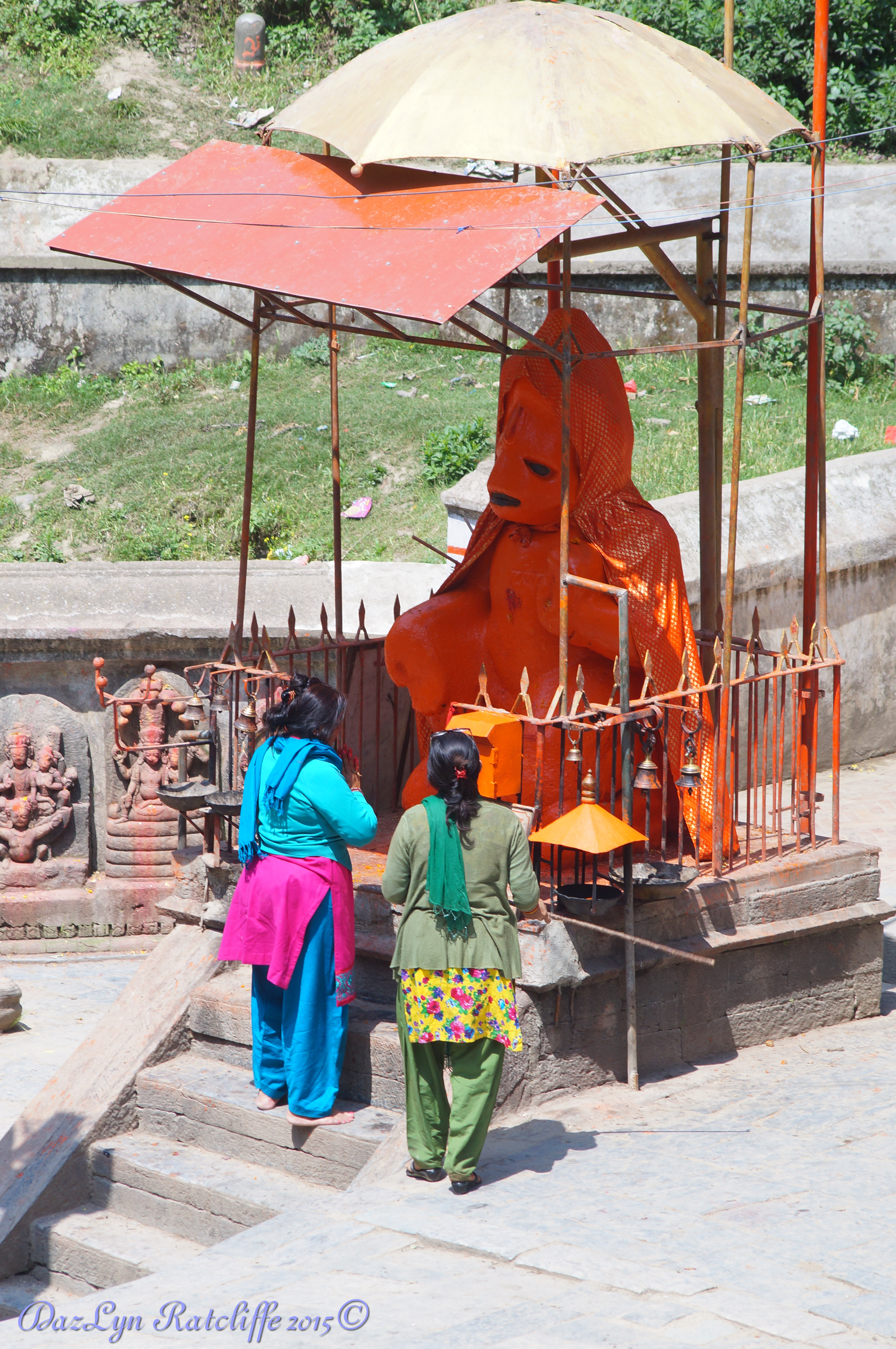
Parvati Goddess at Gaurighat on the Bagmati River, Kathmandu, Nepal
