= Shiva Narayan Khatri =

Kaji Shiva Narayan Khatri
- काजी शिवनारायण खत्री

Kaji of Nepal
- Appointed by: Queen regent Rajendra Rajya Laxmi Devi; Prince Bahadur Shah of Nepal

Military service
- Allegiance: Kingdom of Nepal
- Rank: Kaji
- Battles/wars: Western front war, unification of Nepal

Shiva Narayan Khatri was the Kaji of the Kingdom of Nepal and a military commander in the unification of Nepal during the 18th century.

He was the military commander under Prince regent Bahadur Shah during whose reign the kingdom of Nepal expanded west upto Garhwal and Kumaon regions, now part of India.

== Annexation of Kirat Region ==
King Prithvi Narayan Shah, after facing heavy losses from Kirat fighters in the Kirat region, sent military enforcements under the command of Khatri. After a battle of five months, the Gorkha troops occupied the whole of Kirat region, then known as Majhkirat.

== Annexation of Mustang and Jumla ==
Kaji Shiva Narayan Khatri led the Gorkhali army and seized the Himalayan Kingdom of Mustang which accepted Nepal's suzerainty. Khatri then led the troops via mukstishetra and defeated the kingdom of Jumla, considered the most difficult of the western frontiers, in 1789 AD. The king of Jumla fled to Tibet after the defeat, paving the way for western unification of Nepal.

== Annexation of Gulmi ==
After maintaining matrimonial relation with Palpa, Bahadur Shah sent Kaji Shiva Narayan Khatri, Kaji Jiva Shah and Sardar Amar Singh Thapa to annex Gulmi. The king of Gulmi fled and Gulmi was annexed into the Kingdom of Nepal.
