= Karbir Khatri =

Kaji Karbir Khatri
- काजी करवीर खत्री

Kaji of Nepal
- Prime Minister: Jung Bahadur Rana

Personal details
- Occupation: Governor, Diplomat

Military service
- Allegiance: Kingdom of Nepal

Karbir Khatri was the Kaji of the Kingdom of Nepal during the reign of Prime Minister Jang Bahadur Rana. He was one of the entourage of Jang Bahadur Rana in the first royal Nepalese mission to Europe from 1850-1851.

== Career ==
As a veteran of many diplomatic mission of the Nepalese government, he made more visits to Empire of China than any other Nepali official and was described as someone highly informed on Indian affairs. One of his responsibility was also to keep watch on King Rajendra. He also accompanied Queen Rajya lakshmi alongside the king during her exile to Kashi.

== Later life ==
Karbir Khatri was known as a ‘venerable, old gentleman’. However, he fell out of favor after alleging that the Nepalese Prime Minister had indulged in activities whilst in England that were against Hindu customs, for which he was punished.
