= Padma Bahadur Khatri =

Nepali politician

Nepalese Ambassador to the United States
- In office October 23, 1964 – December 3, 1964
- Preceded by: Matrika Prasad Koirala
- Succeeded by: Kul Shekhar Sharma
- In office January 9, 1976 – January 23, 1976
- Preceded by: Bishweshwar Prasad Rimal
- Succeeded by: Bhekh Bahadur Thapa

Foreign Secretary of Nepal
- In office 1962 – 1964

Personal details
- Born: 1915
- Died: 1985 (aged 69)
- Occupation: Diplomat, politician, soldier
- Known for: Foreign minister of Nepal, Ambassador to UN, Ambassador to US

Padma Bahadur Khatri (19 July 1915 – 1985) was a foreign minister of Nepal, and also served as an army officer and diplomat.

He began his career as a soldier, and eventually attained the rank of Major General. He delivered Nepal's first application for membership of the United Nations in 1948, which was eventually accepted in 1955. He served as Nepal's Permanent Representative to the United Nations, from 1964 until at least 1971, and was twice the President of the Security Council when Nepal was a member of the Council in the 1970s.

In 1962 he was chairman of the Nepal-China Boundary Commission that successfully demarcated the Nepalese-Tibetan border. He served twice as the Nepali Ambassador to the United States in the 1960s and 1970s. In 1982, he was appointed as Foreign Minister by the King of Nepal.

At the time of his death, he was a member of the National Assembly of Nepal.
