= Dipendra KC =

Nepalese Filmmaker and Director

- दीपेन्द्र केसी
- Born: Dipendra KC; June 1988 (age 38)
- Occupations: Filmmaker, director
- Notable work: Sanchalal: Seeds of Hope

Dipendra KC (Nepali: दीपेन्द्र केसी; born 1988) is a Nepali filmmaker from Baglung, Nepal. He works in music videos, documentaries, and short films. Since 2011, he has directed more than 200 music videos and documentaries. KC directed the documentary Sanchalal: Seeds of Hope, which received an award at the Titan International Film Festival Australia (Season 4). The documentary was also selected for the Bollywood and Hollywood Film Festival Australia in 2026. KC has also directed music videos, including Ustai Chha Korera Prem Patra and Timi Chhaura Ta. In 2012, he received an award at the 14th Image Awards.

== Documentaries ==
Title	Release date	Ref.
Sanchalal: Seeds of Hope (received an award at the Titan International Film Festival Australia (Season 4))	2025	
Departure		
Pachheda	2024	

== Music videos ==
Name	Artist	Ref.
"Suru Bhako Chha"	Nita Dhungana / Sonam /Sagar	
"Kyaram Ta Ni"	Paul Shah / Nita Dhungana	
"Gindagi Ko Prapti"	Anup Bikram Shahi / Sarala Thapa	

== Awards and nominations ==
Awarded by	Category	Result	References
Titan International Film Festival (Australia) 2025	Best Short Documentary - Sanchalal: Seeds of Hope	Won	
14th Image Award 2012	Best Music Video Director (Timilai Dekhera)	Nominated	
Nepali Music Video Award 2017	Best Music Video Director (Sunsaan)	Nominated	
Bollywood & Hollywood Film Festival Australia 2025		Selected	
