= Ranabir Khatri =

Gorkha governor

Sardar Ranabir Khatri
- सरदार रणवीर खत्री

Governor (Sardar) of Gorkha
- Monarch: Rana Bahadur Shah

Governor of Garhwal (from 1805 AD)

Personal details
- Relations: Subba Surabir Khatri (brother); Subba Dhaukal Khatri (brother)

Military service
- Allegiance: Gorkha Kingdom
- Rank: Captain

Ranabir Khatri was a governor or sardar of the Gorkha Kingdom.

In the late 1700s, Ranabir Khatri who was the Captain of the Gorkhali army, led the troops and defeated the Kingdom of Doti which was considered one of the strongest of the Baise states. The battle took place against the combined army of Doti and Achham at Narighat. The Gorkhali troops were victorious and the reigning king fled to Pilbhit, currently in Uttar Pradesh in India.

After the victory, Kingdom of Gorkha expanded up to Mahakali river.

In 1805, Ranabir Khatri, along with his brothers Surabir Khatri and Dhaukal Khatri were made the governors of mountains, hills and plains of Garhwal, presently in India, after the Gorkha expansion with a royal decree from King Rana Bahadur Shah.
