= Swami Narayan Gautam Khatri =

Guru Maharaj, Swami, Mahaprabhu Guru Maharaj Narayan Gautam Khatri
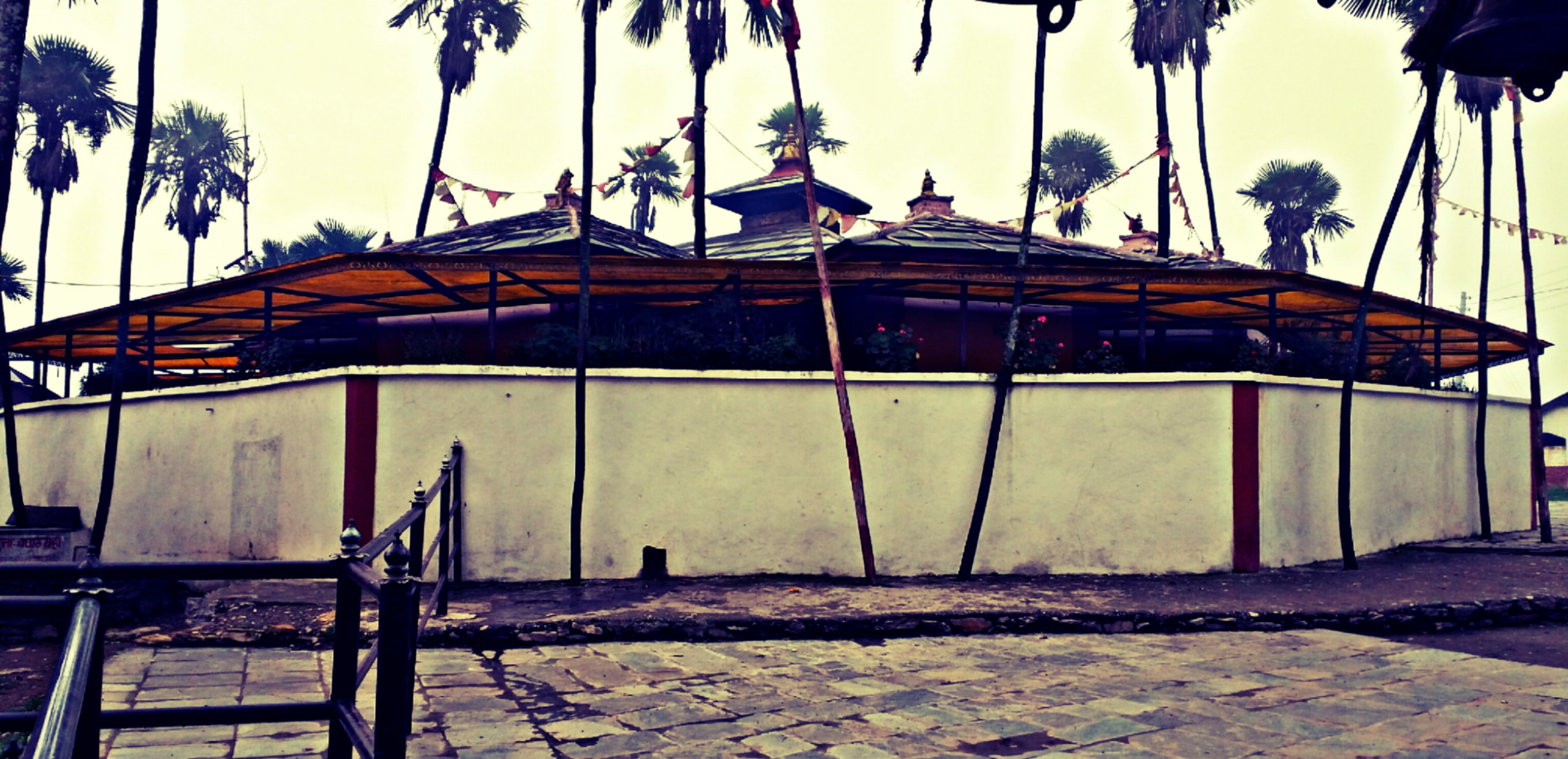
- Temples in Swargadwari

Personal life
- Born: 1858 AD Rolpa, Nepal
- Died: 1940 AD (Pyuthan)

Religious life
- Religion: Hinduism

Religious career
- Position: Hindu Saint

Swami Narayan Gautam Khatri (also known as Swami Hamsanand and Guru Maharaj Narayan Gautam Khatri) was a Hindu spiritual saint credited with the establishment of Swargadwari Temple in Pyuthan, Nepal in the 19th century.

As per the local legend, Swami Hamsananda was born in Rolpa, Nepal and left home in an early age and lived as an ascetic and traveled across Nepal and India where he engaged in deep meditation and yoga, and acquired spiritual powers or siddhis through austerities. In 1895, he arrived at the hilltop in Pyuthan and was in deep states of meditation in the nearby cave. The hilltop would later be known as Swargadwari or the 'Gateway to heaven' and he himself became revered as 'Swargadwari Mahaprabhu' there.

A grand vedic yagya ritual was initiated by Swami in 1895 AD which is dedicated to world peace and is reportedly continuing till present time. He also established a goshala to commemorate the reverence of cows in Nepal.

Swami Hamsanand took samadhi in 1940 AD.
