= Nepal Reinsurance Company Limited =

Reinsurance company in Nepal

Nepal Reinsurance Company नेपाल पुनर्बीमा कम्पनी
- Traded as: NEPSE: 2881
- Industry: Reinsurance
- Founded: December 22, 2014; 11 years ago, Nepal
- Headquarters: Thapathali, Kathmandu, Nepal
- Area served: Worldwide
- Key people: Ishwori Prasad Aryal (chairman); Surendra Thapa (CEO)
- Net income: ▲ रू103 crore (US$6.7 million) (2024)
- Number of employees: 65 (2022)
- Rating: AA− (Icra Nepal)
- Website: nepalre.com.np

Nepal Reinsurance Company (Nepal Re) is Nepal's first reinsurance company which was successor of the insurance pool that was set up in 2003 with the aim to cover the losses arising from situations like riot, sabotage or terrorism and malicious damage (RSTMD) during the Insurgency. It operates under a public–private partnership (PPP) model with equity participation from the Government of Nepal.

== Structure ==
The current paid-up capital of Nepal Reinsurance is 11.65 Billion. The following table shows the percentage of shareholdings by the respective shareholders on the capital structure:

S.No	Owners	Ownership (%)
1	Government of Nepal	44.039051
2	Institutional investor	39.97
3	Public	16

== Services ==
Nepal Re provides reinsurance support to both life and non-life insurers.
Domestically, its portfolio includes treaty, direct session, facultative, RSM/DST, agriculture, motor third-party liability pool, foreign employment pool, and aviation business, partnering with various local non-life insurance companies and life insurance companies depending on the product line.
Internationally, it offers treaty support in 13 countries and facultative reinsurance in 32 countries.
