= Swargadwari =

Swargadwārī
- स्वर्गद्वारी
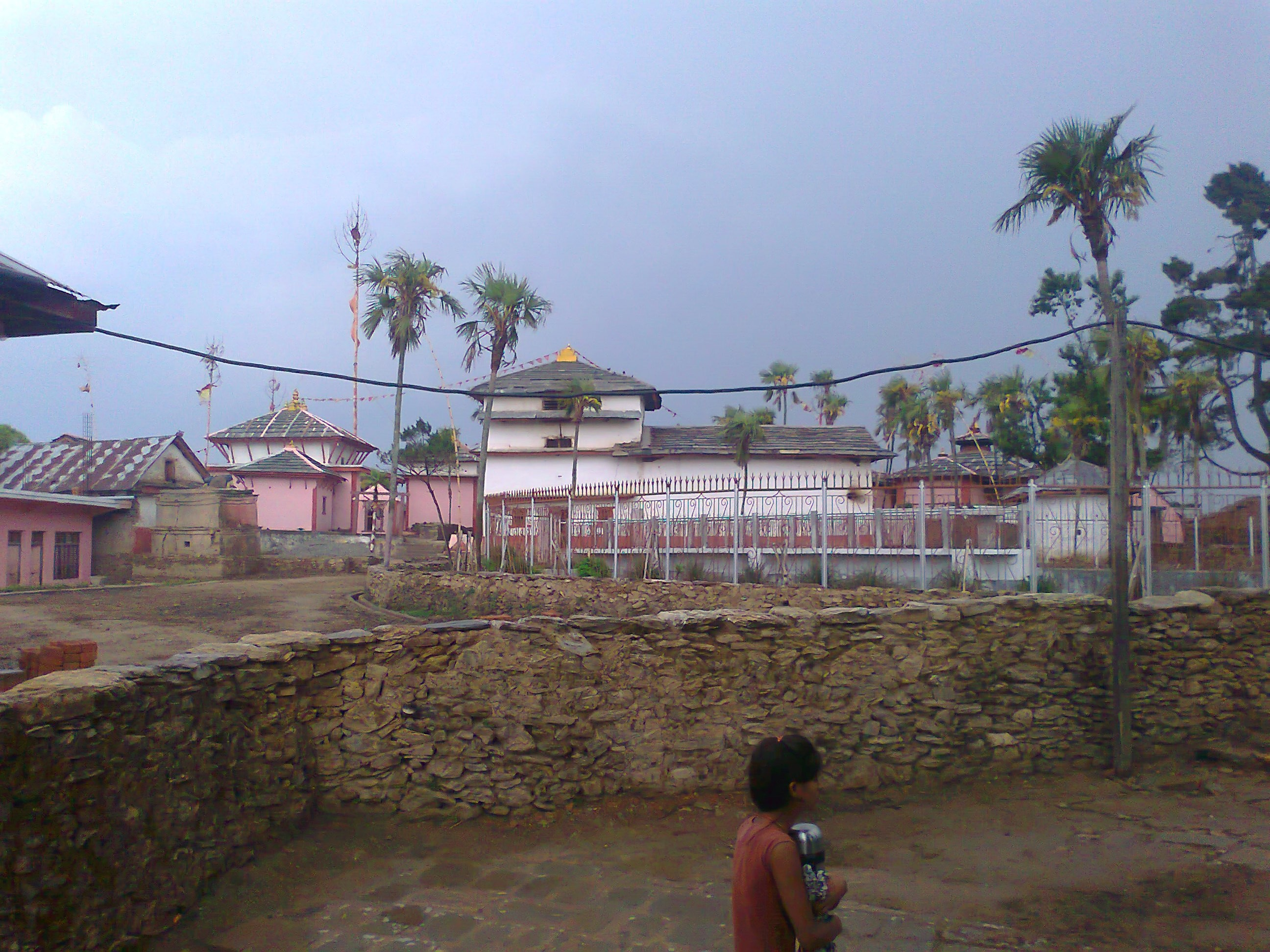

- Location within Nepal

Religion
- Affiliation: Hinduism
- District: Pyuthan District
- Deity: Nārāyaṇa or Viṣṇu, Śiva
- Festivals: Vaiśākha, Kārtika Pūrṇimā

Location
- Location: Mahābhārat Range
- State: Rapti Zone
- Country: Nepal
- Coordinates: 28°7′16.68″N 82°40′24.55″E

Architecture
- Established: 1895 A.D (1952 Vaiśākha Pūrṇimā B.S.)
- Elevation: 2,100 m (6,890 ft)

Sworgadwārī (स्वर्गद्वारी pronounced [swʌrɡʌdwaɾi]) is a hilltop temple and pilgrimage site in Pyuthan District, Nepal, commemorating the special role of cows in Hinduism. It is said to have been founded by Guru Mahārāj Nārāyaṇa Gautama Khāṭrī, also known as Svāmī Hamsānanda, who spent most of his life in the area, herding and milking thousands of cows.

Swargadwārī is considered one of Nepal's top pilgrimage sites and is listed in the national inventory of cultural and historic heritage sites.

As of 2009, a cable car to the temple complex was under construction. In the aftermath of the 1996-2006 Nepalese Civil War, donations of straw and hay had diminished to the point where resident cattle at Swargadwārī were in danger of starving.
