= List of ambassadors of Nepal to the United States =

Ambassador of Nepal to the United States
- Incumbent; Shridhar Khatri since February 17, 2021
- Inaugural holder: Kaiser Shumsher Jang Bahadur Rana
- Formation: 1948 / 1953
- Website: https://us.nepalembassy.gov.np/ambassador/

The Nepali Ambassador in Washington, D. C. is the official representative of Nepal to the United States.

== List of representatives ==
Diplomatic agrément	Diplomatic accreditation	Representative/ Ambassador	Prime Minister of Nepal	President of the United States	Notes
February 16, 1948	February 19, 1948	Kaiser Shumsher Jang Bahadur Rana	Mohan Shamsher Jang Bahadur Rana	Harry S. Truman	Legation opened
August 19, 1948		Subba Iswary Raj Misra	Mohan Shamsher Jang Bahadur Rana	Harry S. Truman	Chargé d'affaires
September 21, 1949	September 27, 1949	Shankar Shumsher Jung Bahadur Rana	Mohan Shumsher Jang Bahadur Rana	Harry S. Truman	Chargé d'affaires
February 24, 1953			Matrika Prasad Koirala	Dwight D. Eisenhower	Legation raised to embassy
February 17, 1953	February 24, 1953	Shankar Shumsher Jung Bahadur Rana	Matrika Prasad Koirala	Dwight D. Eisenhower	
September 29, 1958	October 27, 1958	Rishikesh Shah	Subarna Shamsher Rana	Dwight D. Eisenhower	
July 13, 1961	August 3, 1961	Matrika Prasad Koirala	Tulsi Giri	John F. Kennedy	
October 23, 1964	December 3, 1964	Padma Bahadur Khatri	Tulsi Giri	Lyndon B. Johnson	Served again as an ambassador from 1976–1980.
April 4, 1969	April 17, 1969	Kul Shekhar Sharma	Kirti Nidhi Bista	Richard Nixon	
April 27, 1973	June 14, 1973	Yadunath Khanal	Nagendra Prasad Rijal	Richard Nixon	
May 25, 1975		Bishweshwar Prasad Rimal	Tulsi Giri	Gerald Ford	Chargé d'affaires
January 9, 1976	January 23, 1976	Padma Bahadur Khatri	Tulsi Giri	Gerald Ford	Previously served as an ambassador from 1964–1969. Memorandum of conversation between U.S. President Gerald Ford and the Nepalese Ambassador Padma Bahadur Khatri at the presentation of credentials on January 23, 1976
August 8, 1980	August 29, 1980	Bhekh Bahadur Thapa	Surya Bahadur Thapa	Jimmy Carter	
February 3, 1986	February 18, 1986	Bishwa Pradhan	Nagendra Prasad Rijal	Ronald Reagan	
August 29, 1988	September 19, 1988	Mohan Man Sainju	Nagendra Prasad Rijal	Ronald Reagan	
November 5, 1991	November 25, 1991	Yog Prasad Upadhyay	Girija Prasad Koirala	George H. W. Bush	
March 7, 1995	March 20, 1995	Basudev Prasad Dhungana	Sher Bahadur Deuba	Bill Clinton	
March 18, 1996	April 30, 1996	Bhekh Bahadur Thapa	Sher Bahadur Deuba	Bill Clinton	
September 9, 1998	September 10, 1998	Damodar Prasad Gautam	Girija Prasad Koirala	Bill Clinton	
January 28, 2002	February 14, 2002	Jai Pratap Rana	Gyanendra of Nepal	George W. Bush	
August 20, 2004	September 15, 2004	Kedar Bhakta Shrestha	Sher Bahadur Deuba	George W. Bush	
November 21, 2007	January 22, 2008	Suresh Chandra Chalise	Girija Prasad Koirala	George W. Bush	
November 18, 2009	February 24, 2010	Shankar Prasad Sharma	Madhav Kumar Nepal	Barack Obama	
May 11, 2015	May 18, 2015	Arjun Karki	Sushil Koirala	Barack Obama	
December 24, 2020	February 17, 2021	Yuba Raj Khatiwada	Khadga Prasad Sharma Oli	Joe Biden	
June 21, 2024		Chandra Ghimire		Joe Biden	
21 March, 2025		Lok Darshan Regmi		Donald Trump	
