= Lal Singh Khatri =

19th century Nepali Army lieutenant

- लाल सिंह खत्री

Lieutenant Colonel of Nepal Army
- Prime Minister: Jang Bahadur Rana

Personal details
- Occupation: Army Lieutenant

Military service
- Allegiance: Kingdom of Nepal

Lal Singh Khatri was a Lieutenant in the Royal Nepali Army and the first Nepalese person to study English. Reported to have been a fluent English speaker, Khatri studied English with Brian Houghton Hodgson, a British Resident at the court of Nepal in the early 1840s. He also represented Nepal on the joint exercise with the British to define borders on the Indian districts of Purnea in 1844 and Saran in 1849.

Khatri accompanied Nepal's Premier Jang Bahadur Rana in the first Nepalese royal mission to England and France from 1850-1851. While in London, he wrote an article on the Illustrated London News on the subject of Nepal-Tibet border, and is considered the first Nepali to publish in English. In the late 1850s, Khatri was a Nepal government agent in Calcutta, British India with the rank of lieutenant colonel, and later as a full colonel.
