= Gaurab Kumar KC =

Nepali general

Major General Gaurab Kumar KC
- गौरव कुमार केसी
- Born: 13 August 1969 (age 57); Syangja District, Gandaki Province, Nepal
- Education: Madras University
- Children: 1
- Military career
- Allegiance: Nepal
- Branch: Nepali Army
- Service years: 1991–present
- Rank: Major General
- Unit: Purano Gorakh Battalion
- Commands: Eastern Division; No. 3 Brigade; Purano Gorakh Battalion; Bhagwati Prasad Company
- UN peacekeeping missions: UNIFIL; MONUSCO; UNAMID
- Awards: Suprabal Janasewa Shree; COAS Commendation Badge; IG APF Commendation Badge

Major General Gaurab Kumar KC (Nepali: गौरव कुमार केसी) is a two star officer of the Nepali Army and incumbent general officer commanding (GOC) of Eastern Division. He is also the former director of Public Relations and Information and Nepali Army spokesperson.

== Personal life ==
Gaurab was born on 13 August 1969, in Syangja district, Gandaki Province, Nepal. He is married and they have a son.
