= Rishikesh Shah =

Nepalese writer, politician and human rights activist

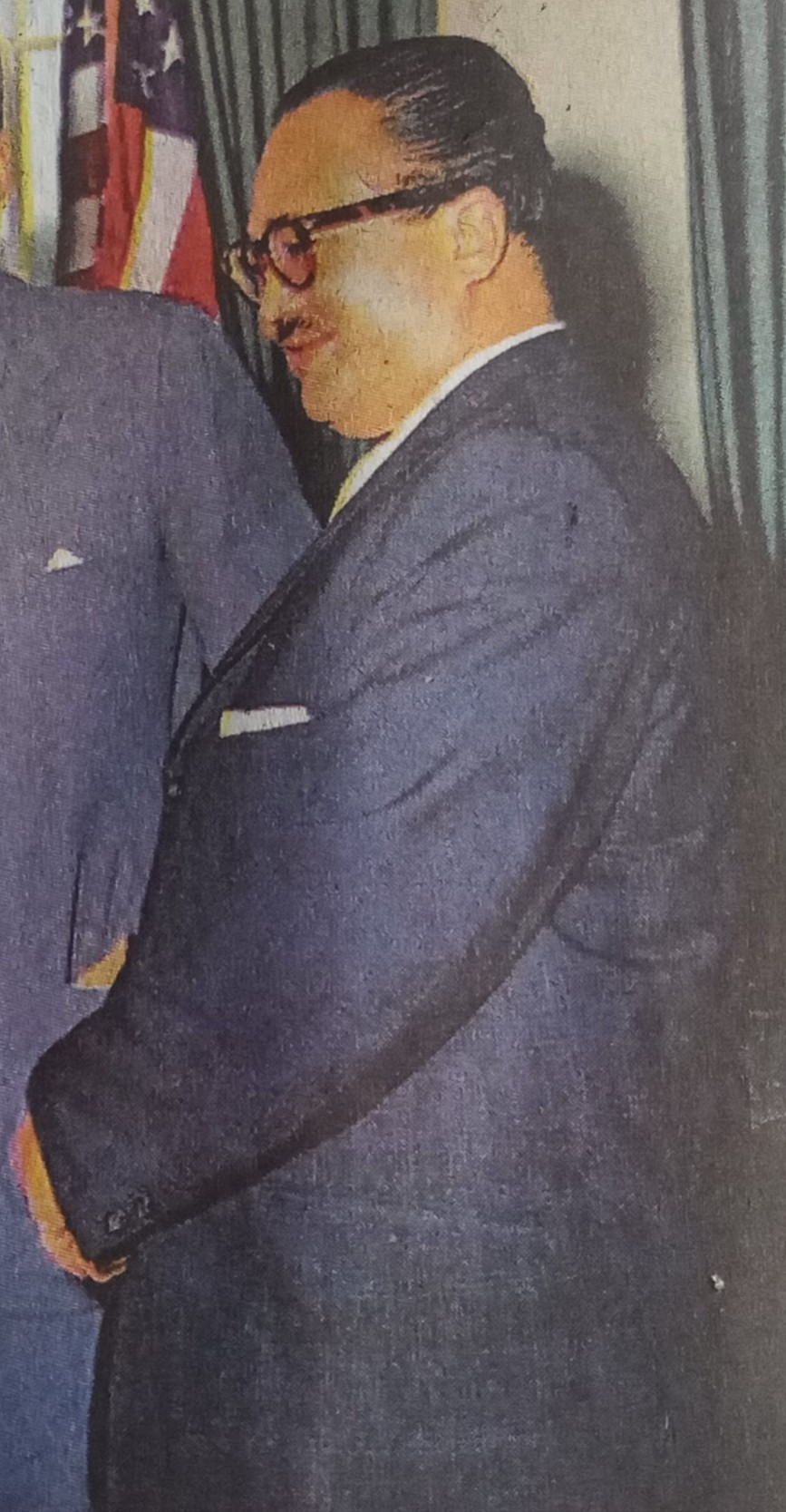

Minister of Finance
- In office December 1960 – July 1962
- Preceded by: Subarna Shamsher Rana
- Succeeded by: Surya Bahadur Thapa

Ambassador to the United States
- In office September 29, 1956 – 1960
- Preceded by: Shankar Shumsher Jung Bahadur Rana
- Succeeded by: Matrika Prasad Koirala

Permanent Representative to the United Nations
- In office 1956 – 1960
- Preceded by: Position created
- Succeeded by: Unknown

Personal details
- Born: May 16, 1925
- Died: November 13, 2002 (aged 77)
- Relatives: Kamal Rana(sister)
- Occupation: Writer, politician, human rights activist

Rishikesh Shah (May 16, 1925 – November 13, 2002) was a Nepalese writer, politician and human rights activist.

== Career ==
=== Political ===
Shah was a member of the Nepal Prajatantrik Party from 1948 to 1949. Between 1951 and 1953, he was the general secretary of the Nepali Rastriya Congress. He then became general secretary of the joint Nepali Congress-Nepali Rashtriya Congress front until 1956. Shah was Minister of Finance from 1960 to 1962. In 1962 he became chair of the Constitution Drafting Commission. Between 1967 and 1971 he represented the graduate constituency in the National Panchayat. In the Panchayat, he was one of the most prominent advocates of democratic reforms.

=== Diplomatic ===
Shah was the Nepalese ambassador to the United States and the first Permanent Representative of Nepal to the United Nations between 1956 and 1960. In 1961 Shah was elected by the United Nations General Assembly to chair the International Commission to investigate the death of UN Secretary General Dag Hammarskjöld, who had suffered an air crash over Congo. Shah was one of the candidates to succeed Hammarskjöld, but was defeated by U Thant.

=== Academic ===
Shah lectured in English and Nepali at Tri-Chandra College 1945–1948. During the period 1947–1948 he served as Chief Inspector of Schools.

Shah served as visiting professor at the School of International Studies, Jawaharlal Nehru University, New Delhi, India in 1970. In 1971 he served as Regents' Professor at the University of California, Berkeley, USA. He was a Fellow at the Woodrow Wilson International Center for Scholars, Washington, D.C., and the East-West Center, Honolulu.

Shah authored several works about Nepalese politics and history.

=== Organizational ===
Shah was president of the Nepal Council of World Affairs and in 1988 he became the founding president of the Human Rights Organisation of Nepal (HURON). Later, he left HURON.
