= Khagendra Bahadur KC =

Nepalese diplomat

English Secretary of Nepal
- Appointed by: Baber Shumsher Jung Bahadur Rana
- Monarch: King Tribhuvan

Khagendra Bahadur KC, was a late Nepalese diplomat who served as the first English Secretary of the Kingdom of Nepal during the mid-20th century.

He was appointed to this role under General Babar Shumsher Jung Bahadur Rana during the reign of King Tribhuvan.

As English secretary, KC handled foreign correspondence during a volatile period when Nepal transitioned from Rana rule to democracy. In addition, KC was an English professor at Tribhuvan University and authored a book 'Kranti and the Coup (A Personal History 1945-1963)', which was posthumously published in 2024.
