= Chandrabhan Khatri =

Sardar Chandrabhan Khatri
- सरदार चंद्रभान खत्री

Governor

Personal details
- Born: Nuwakot District, Gorkha Kingdom
- Relations: Kalu Upadhyaya (grand father); Suryabhan Khatri (father)

Military service
- Allegiance: Kingdom of Nepal
- Battles/wars: Unification of Nepal

Chandrabhan Khatri was a governor (or Sardar) of the Gorkha kingdom and Kingdom of Nepal in the 18-19th century.

== Unification of Nepal ==
In 1805, Sardar Khatri was a leader of the army along with Kaji Amar Singh Thapa in the western front war of the unification of Nepal. Khatri was sent to the western front of the kingdom with a royal order and a royal sword to Amar Singh Thapa that instructed him to "keep the royal sword which had been in the king's waist for a few days after ritual consecration" and to remain "ritually pure as long as the royal sword is in your waist, keep it there at the time when there is fighting and victory will be assured".
