= Kaji Man Samsohang =

Nepalese politician

Personal details
- Party: CPN (UML)

Kaji Man Samsohang was a Nepalese politician, belonging to the Communist Party of Nepal (Unified Marxist-Leninist). He contested the Taplejung-1 constituency in the 1994 legislative election, coming in second place with 9822 votes. He was defeated by Mani Lama.
