= The Soldier (2016 film) =

Nepali film

- Directed by: B.S.Balami
- Story by: Shekhar Gyawali
- Produced by: Gehendra Bajracharya
- Starring: Diwash Upreti Jenisha KC; Sunil Thapa; Suleman Shankar; Subash Meche Rajendra Chaudhary
- Cinematography: Raj Krishna Maharjan
- Music by: Manohar Sunam
- Production company: BG Films
- Distributed by: Shree Ram Balaji Films
- Release date: 19 February 2016
- Running time: 130 minutes
- Country: Nepal
- Language: Nepali

The Soldier (Nepali: द सोल्जर) is a Nepali film which was released on 19 February 2016.

Actor Diwash Upreti and actress Jenisha KC are in the lead role. Suleman Shankhar (aka Eku) is also see in the movie. This is a debut movie for Rajendra Chaudhary where he is in the get up as comparable to the 'Tarzan'. Sunil Thapa can be seen in a negative role.

== Cast ==
- Diwash Upreti
- Jenisha KC
- Sunil Thapa
- Suleman Shankaar as Ikku
- Subash Meche as ACP suvash
- Rajendra Chaudhary

== Production ==
This film was the first start up film for the production company BG Films which began filming in 2010. This film was shot on Arri Super 16mm camera. The post production was completed in the NFDC studio and later the negative of the Super 16mm film was processed in Bombay, India.

Most of the scenes of the movie was shot in Chitwan which also include the scenes within the Chitwan National Park. A scene in the movie includes the shot of Rajendra Chaudhary performing stunts among a herd of 12 elephants.

The fight scene as performed by Rajendra Chaudhary includes some real free style stunts without the use of the stunt wire.
