= Kaji Pratha =

Nepali political role

Kaji Pratha (Nepali: काजी प्रथा) is the honorary hereditary practice that originated from medieval period in Nepal.

Ganesh Pande was the first Kaji under King Dravya Shah of Gorkha Kingdom. He helped Dravya Shah to become King of Gorkha and was later appointed Kaji of Gorkha (Note: The position of Kaji in Gorkha hill principality was not of only a mere minister but of the chief or prime minister.) in 1559 A.D. Another significant Kaji of Gorkha was Kalu Pande born in the family of Ganesh Pande. He was son of Bhimraj Pande who was also a Kaji during the reign of King Nara Bhupal Shah.
