= Mrs Nepal World =

Beauty pageant Nepal

- मिसेस नेपाल वर्ल्ड
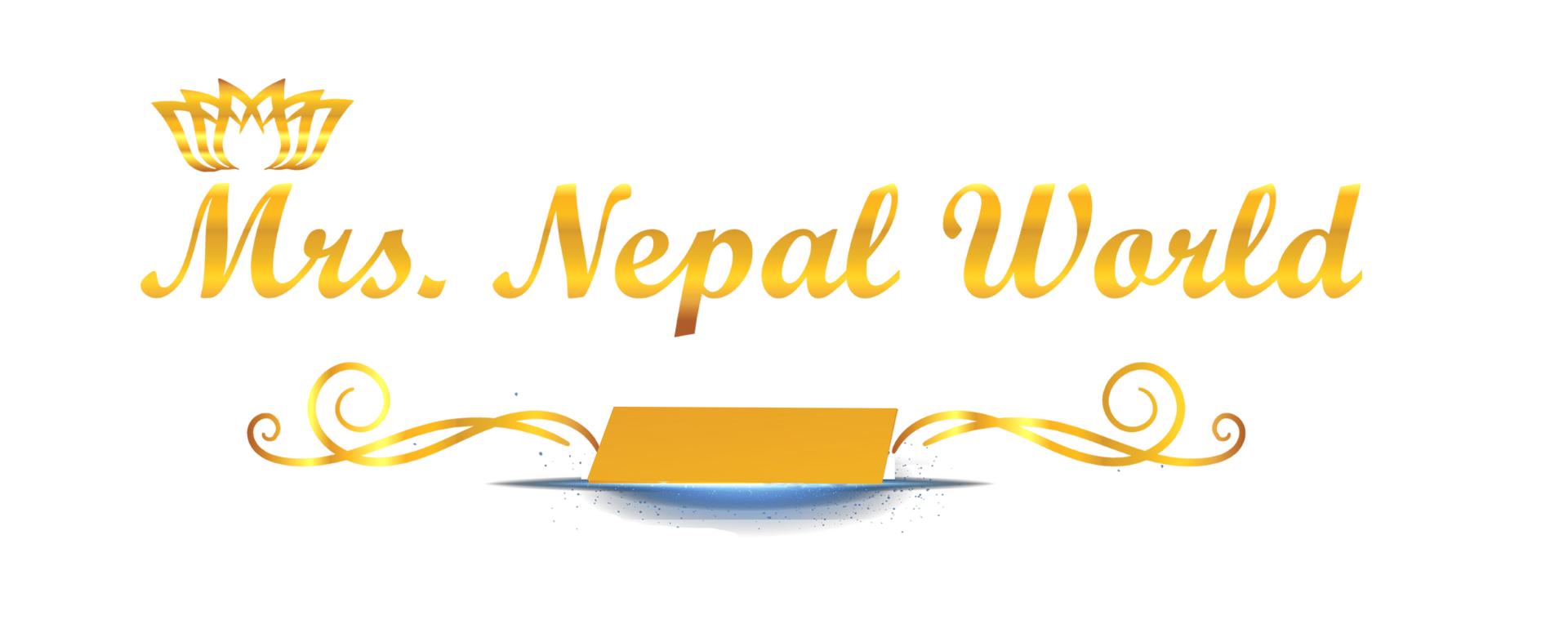
- Type: Beauty pageant
- Franchise holder: Mrs World and Mrs International
- Parent organization: Ribbon Entertainment Pvt. Ltd.
- First edition: 2015
- Most recent edition: 2025
- Chairperson: Nishu Kant Gha
- Language: English
- Website: https://www.ribbonentertainment.com.np/

Mrs Nepal World is an annual national beauty pageant in Nepal that is open to married women. It is organized by Ribbon Entertainment Pvt. Ltd. The competition was first held under the title Mrs Nepal International and was rebranded as "Mrs Nepal World" in 2021. Winners of the pageant go on to represent Nepal at international contests, including Mrs. World and Mrs International.

== History ==
Ribbon Entertainment first established the pageant in 2014 with the aim of promoting empowerment and public representation for married women in Nepal. Under its earlier title, Mrs Nepal International, the pageant’s winners represented Nepal at the Mrs International competition, traditionally held in Singapore.

In its initial editions, Sabita Lamichhane was crowned Mrs Nepal International 2015, with Parikalpana Rai and Bijayata Shrestha among the runners-up. Anupama Rai won the title in 2016, followed by Suruchi Pandey in 2017, Chanda Thapa Giri in 2018, and Bhawisha Koirala Chataut in 2019. A separate title, Ms Nepal International 2019, was awarded to Dr. Rangina Laikangbam, with Rojina Bhattarai, Sneha Raut Thapa, Sabnam Kharel, and Shilpi Gupta finishing as runners-up.

== Mrs Nepal World winner ==
| SN | Year | Winner's full name | First runner up | Second runner up | Third runner up | Reference |
| 1 | 2021/2022 | Diksha KC Kathmandu | Sumita Lama | Rajshree Thapa | Manita Pyakurel | |
| 2 | 2023 | Prithiviya Thapa Itahari | Aaina Gagurel | Nisha Bista | Saru RL Rana | |
| 3 | 2024 | Dr. Denila Karki Kathmandu | Alina Ghimire | Kiran Karki Silwal | Annu Karki | |
| 4 | 2025 | Rakshya Panta Butwal | Bidhya Chauhan | Elina KC | Nirmala Sunuwar | |

== Mrs Nepal International (2015–2025) ==
Ribbon Entertainment established the event in 2015. Winners of Mrs Nepal International went on to represent Nepal in the Mrs International pageant held in Singapore.

| SN | Year | Winner | First runner up | Second runner up | Third runner up | Forth runner up |
| 1 | 2015 | Sabita Lamichhane Panchthar | Riti Baral Lalitpur | Pari Kalpana Rai Kathmandu | Bijayata Shrestha Kathmandu | Smita Pandey Kathmandu |
| 2 | 2016 | Anupama Rai | Binda Khatiwata | Jyoti Thaoa | Samundra Lama | Chuna KC |
| 3 | 2017 | Suruchi Pandey | Yoshada Pokheral | Pratigya Rai | Samjhana Tripathi | Jyoti Dahal Paneru |
| 4 | 2018 | Chanda Thapa Giri Sarlahi | Smriti Shrestha | Pratima Sharma | Junu Sharma | Rupa Siwakoti |
| 5 | 2019 | Bhabisa Koirala | Rosina Bhattarai | Sneha Thapa Rawat | Shabnam Kharel | Shilpi Gupta |
| 7 | 2020 | - | | | | |
| 9 | 2021 | Usha Rajak | | | | |
| 10 | 2022 | | | | | |
| 11 | 2023 | Shrijana KC | | | | |
| 12 | 2024 | Suyesha Rawat | | | | |
| 13 | 2025 | Sanju Bhatta | | | | |

== Ms Nepal International (2019–present) ==
| SN | Year | Winner | Ref |
| 1 | 2019 | Dr. Rangina Laikangbam | |
| 2 | 2021 | Parbati Giri | |
| 3 | 2023 | Sita Subedi | |
| 4 | 2024 | Reshma Ghimire | |
| 5 | 2025 | Dipika Tamang | |
