= Vamsha Raj Khatri =

Sardar Vamsha Raj Khatri
- सरदार वंश राज खत्री

Governor of Gorkha Kingdom
- Monarch: Shah Dynasty

Military service
- Allegiance: Gorkha Kingdom
- Battles/wars: War of Unification of Nepal, Nepal-Britain war

Vamsha Raj Khatri was a governor (or Sardar) of the Gorkha Kingdom in the 19th century.

== Anglo-Nepalese war ==
Khatri served as the chief of administration and military during the unification of Nepal. As per the historical record, a mandatory royal decree was issued from the palace in the year 1815–1816 AD (the time of Anglo-Nepalese War between Britain and Nepal) ordering all the inhabitants of Jumla and Jajarkot to provide labour for the construction of war fort under Sardar Vamsha Raj Khatri. Upadhaya Brahmins were excluded from the labour, but were instructed to recite vedas and mantras to wish the royals victory.
