= Gaja Simha Khatri =

Sardar Gaja Simha Khatri
- सरदार गजसिंह खत्री

Governor of Gorkha Kingdom

Sardar
- Monarch: Girvan Yuddha Bikram Shah

Military service
- Allegiance: Gorkha Kingdom

Gaja Simha Khatri was a sardar or governor of the Gorkha Kingdom of the 19th century.

Khatri was the governor during the expansion of the kingdom of Gorkha during the late 18th and 19th century, and was assigned to the eastern part of the kingdom (known as Vijayapur) to maintain law and order. One of his tasks was to oversee and reprimand if the landowners and district chiefs in the provinces commit injustice, and inspect the war forts as well as inspect arms and ammunitions of the military companies.
