= MetLife Nepal =

Insurance company in Nepal

- Company type: Public company
- Industry: Insurance
- Founded: 2001; 25 years ago
- Headquarters: Pulchowk, Lalitpur, Nepal
- Area served: Nepal
- Key people: Nirmal Kajee Shrestha Vice President & General Manager
- Products: Life insurance
- Website: www.metlife.com.np/en/

American Life Insurance Company Limited MetLife Nepal is a life insurance company in Nepal established in 2001. As of 16 July 2019, they have total source of NRS 18,633,007,259.

They started Insurance service in Nepal since 5 December 2001 and till now they have more than 8000 agents and 35 branches.

== Services ==
1. Life insurance
2. Health insurance
3. Accident insurance
4. Employee benefits Insurance
