= Rastriya Jeevan Beema Company Limited =

Life insurance company in Nepal

Rastriya Jeevan Beema Company Limited राष्ट्रिय जीवन बीमा कम्पनी लिमिटेड
- Company type: Public company
- Industry: Insurance services
- Founded: 1967; 59 years ago
- Headquarters: Singha Durbar Plaza, Kathmandu
- Area served: Nepal
- Key people: Mr. Ramesh Aryal (chairman); Chief Executive Officer Mr. Sundar Panthee (Administration)
- Products: Life insurance
- Owner: Government of Nepal
- Website: rbs.gov.np

Rastriya Jeevan Beema Company Limited is the first life insurance company in Nepal which was established as its previous Name Rastriya Beema Sansthan. Established by the Government of Nepal.

It used to sell both life and non-life insurance until the passage of Insurance Act 2049 B.S. making it impossible and went to only selling life.

They are operating in Nepal through 23 branches located at various part of nepal.

== Life Insurance Product Offered by Company ==
- Endowment plan
- Whole life plan
- Child plan
- Money back plan
