= Kingdom of Nepal =

Sovereign kingdom in South Asia (1768–2008)

Kingdom of Nepal: नेपाल अधिराज्य; Nepāl Adhirājya
- 1768–2008
- Flag (1962–2008) Coat of arms (1962–2008)
- Motto: जननी जन्मभूमिश्च स्वर्गादपि गरीयसी; Janani Janmabhūmishcha Swargādapi Garīyasī; "Mother and Motherland are greater than heaven"
- Anthem: 1962–2006: श्रीमान गम्भीर; Srīmān Gambhīr; "May Glory Crown You, Courageous Sovereign"; Anthem: 2007–2008: सयौँ थुँगा फूलका; Sayauṁ thum̐gā phūlakā; "Made of Hundreds of Flowers"
- The Kingdom of Nepal in 2008.
- Status: Sovereign monarchy
- Capital and largest city: Kathmandu; 27°42′N 85°19′E
- Official languages: Nepali; Newar (former) (Note: Newar was used as a literary and administrative language in the initial period.)
- Religion: Hinduism (official)
- Demonyms: Nepali; Nepalese
- Government: Absolute monarchy (1768–1959; 1960–1990; 2002; 2005–2006); Parliamentary constitutional monarchy (1959–1960; 1990–2002; 2002–2005; 2006–2008)
- King
  - 1768–1775 (first): Prithvi Narayan Shah
  - 2001–2008 (last): Gyanendra
- Prime Minister
  - 1799–1804 (first): Damodar Pande
  - 2006–2008 (last): Girija Prasad Koirala
- Legislature: None (rule by decree) (1768–1959; 2005–2006); Rastriya Panchayat (1962–1990); Parliament (1959–1962; 1990–2005; 2006–2007); Interim legislature (2007–2008)
  - Upper house: Senate (1959–1960); National Assembly (1990–2002)
  - Lower house: House of Representatives (1959–1960; 1990–2002)
- History
  - Unification under Prithivi Narayan Shah: 25 September 1768
  - Thapa premiers (under Shah kings): 1806–1837 and 1843–1845
  - Pande premiers (under Shah kings): 1799–1804 and 1837–1840
  - Rana regime (under Shah kings): 1846–1951
  - Panchayat system: 1960–1990
  - Constitutional monarchy: 1990–2008
  - Republic: 28 May 2008

Area
  - Total: 147,516 km^{2} (56,956 sq mi) (93rd)
  - Water (%): 2.8%
- GDP (PPP): 2006 estimate
  - Total: ▲$52,226 billion (93rd)
  - Per capita: ▲$1717.8
- GDP (nominal): 2006 estimate
  - Total: ▲$3.043 billion (115th)
  - Per capita: ▲$9,044
- Gini (2003): 43.8 medium inequality
- HDI (2006): ▲0.503 low (149th)
- Currency: Nepalese mohar (1768–1932); Nepalese rupee (Rs, रू) (1932–2008); (NPR)
- Time zone: UTC+05:45 (NST)
- Date format: YYYY-MM-DD (Note: See Date and time notation in Nepal.)
- Calling code: +977
- ISO 3166 code: NP
- Internet TLD: .np
Preceded by
1768: Gorkha Kingdom
1769: Malla Dynasty
1770s—1780s: Chaubisi Rajya
1776: Kingdom of Sikkim
1780s: Baise Rajya
1791: Doti Kingdom
Kumaon Kingdom
1804: Garhwal Kingdom
500-1200CE: Katyuri dynasty
Succeeded by
1816: Princely State of Tehri Garhwal
Kingdom of Sikkim
2008: Federal Democratic Republic of Nepal
- Today part of: Nepal; India; China; Bangladesh

The Kingdom of Nepal (Nepali: नेपाल अधिराज्य), also known as the Gorkha Empire or Asal Hindustan (lit. 'Real Land of the Hindus'), (Note: King Prithvi Narayan Shah self proclaimed the newly unified Kingdom of Nepal as Asal Hindustan due to North India being ruled by the Islamic Mughal rulers. The self proclamation was done to enforce the Hindu social code of Dharmashastra over his reign and refer to his country as being inhabitable for people of Dharmic religions. He also referred Northern part of India as Mughlan (Country of Mughals) and called the region infiltrated by Muslim foreigners.) was a landlocked Hindu monarchy in South Asia that existed from 1768 to 2008. It was established through the expansion of the Gorkha Kingdom, a process known as the unification of Nepal, under King Prithvi Narayan Shah, a Gorkhali monarch of the Shah dynasty. Through a series of military conquests spanning roughly seven decades, the realm expanded across the central Himalayas to form Nepal. It remained the world's last Hindu monarchy until 28 May 2008, when the monarchy was abolished and Nepal became a federal democratic republic.

After the invasion of Tibet and plundering of Digarcha by Nepali forces under Prince Regent Bahadur Shah in 1792, the Dalai Lama and Chinese Ambans reported to the Chinese administration for military support. The Chinese and Tibetan forces under Fuk'anggan attacked Nepal but went for negotiations after failure at Nuwakot. Mulkaji Damodar Pande, who was the most influential among the four Kajis, was appointed after the removal of Bahadur Shah. Chief Kaji (Mulkaji) Kirtiman Singh Basnyat, tried to protect king Girvan Yuddha Shah and keep former king, Rana Bahadur Shah away from Nepal. However, on 4 March 1804, the former king came back and took over as Mukhtiyar and Damodar Pande was then beheaded in Thankot. The 1806 Bhandarkhal massacre instigated upon the death of Rana Bahadur Shah, set forth the rise of the authoritative Mukhtiyar Bhimsen Thapa, who became the de facto ruler of Nepal from 1806 to 1837. During the early nineteenth century, however, the expansion of the East India Company's rule in India led to the Anglo-Nepalese War (1814–1816), which resulted in Nepal's defeat.

Under the Treaty of Sugauli, the kingdom retained its internal independence, but in exchange for territorial concessions, marking the Mechi and Sharda rivers as the boundary of Nepalese territories. The territory of the kingdom before the Sugauli treaty is sometimes nascently referred to as Greater Nepal. In the political scenario, the death of Mukhtiyar Mathbar Singh Thapa ended the Thapa hegemony and set the stage for the Kot massacre. This resulted in the ascendancy of the Rana dynasty, of Khas (Chhetri) background, whose members subsequently served as the hereditary prime minister for over a century, from 1843 to 1951. Beginning with Jung Bahadur, the first Rana ruler, the Rana dynasty reduced the Shah monarch's role to that of a figurehead and exercised absolute control. The Rana rule was marked by tyranny, debauchery, economic exploitation and religious persecution.

King Tribhuvan played a significant role in ending the autocratic Rana regime and initiating the democratic movement in Nepal. Although Tribhuvan's power was constrained by the Rana dynasty, he maintained covert support for political movements working to establish democracy, including ties with the Nepali Congress and other anti-Rana groups. In November 1950, amidst growing political unrest and demands for reform, King Tribhuvan sought asylum in the Indian Embassy in Kathmandu and later went into exile in India with most of the royal family. The Rana regime briefly declared his grandson, Gyanendra, as the new king, a move that was not recognized internationally.

Unsuccessful attempts were made to implement reforms and adopt a constitution during the 1960s and 1970s. An economic crisis at the end of the 1980s led to a popular movement that brought about parliamentary elections and the adoption of a constitutional monarchy in 1990. The 1990s saw the beginning of the Nepalese Civil War (1996–2006), a conflict between government forces and the insurgent forces of the Communist Party of Nepal (Maoist).

The Nepalese monarchy was further destabilised by the 2001 Nepalese royal massacre, which resulted in Gyanendra assuming the throne again. His imposition of direct rule in 2005 provoked a protest movement unifying the Maoist insurgency and pro-democracy activists. He was eventually forced to restore the House of Representatives, which in 2007 adopted an interim constitution greatly restricting the powers of the Nepalese monarchy. Following an election held the next year, the Nepalese Constituent Assembly formally voted to declare a republic in its first session on 28 May 2008.

== History ==
=== 18th century ===
==== Origins ====
The country was expanded from that of the Chaubise principality called the Gorkha Kingdom. In Nepal, the warrior people are not referred to as 'Gurkhas', they are called 'Gorkhalis', meaning the 'inhabitants of Gorkha.' Their famed battle cry is "Jai Kali, Jai Gorakhnath, Jai Manakamana".

The etymology of the geographical name 'Gorkha' is indeed related to the Hindu mendicant-saint Gorakhnath. In the village of Gorkha, there is a temple dedicated to Gorakhnath as well as another dedicated to Gorakhkali, a corresponding female deity. The Nepali geographical encyclopedia 'Mechi dekhi Mahakali' (From Mechi to Mahakali) published in B.S. 2013 (1974–75 AD) by the authoritarian Panchayat government to mark the coronation of King Birendra Shah agrees with the association of the name of the place with the saint but does not add any further detail. The facts regarding when the temples were built and the place named after the saint are lost in the sweeping winds of time. We may guess that these developments took place in the early part of the second millennium of the Common Era following the rise of the Nath sect. In fact, the pilgrimage circuit of the sect across the northern Indian sub-continent also spans a major part of Nepal including the Kathmandu Valley. The Newars of Medieval Nepal have a couple of important temples and festivals dedicated to the major Nath teachers. Immediately before the rule of Gorkha by the Shahs, Gorkha was inhabited by both aboriginee Aryan and Tibetan Mongoloid ethnic groups Magars the largest among the ethnic groups, and the area was historially part of the Magarat region and was ruled by the Magars King Khadka Magar and Ghale Magar. Khadka Magar sub-clan of Rana-Magar and Ghale Magar sub-clan of Thapa-Magar clan, who were probably of Magar origin. At first, Dravya Shah captured Liglig-kot kingdom from Magar King Dalsur Ghale Magar. Gangaram Rana Magar also helped Dravya Shah to defeat a Magar King. After captured Ligligkot, (now Gorkha) Dravya Shah defeated the King Mansingh Khadka Magar in 1559 AD and commenced Shah rule over the principality. Prithvi Narayan Shah belonged to the ninth generation of the Shahs in Gorkha. He took the reins of power in 1742 AD.

==== Expansion ====
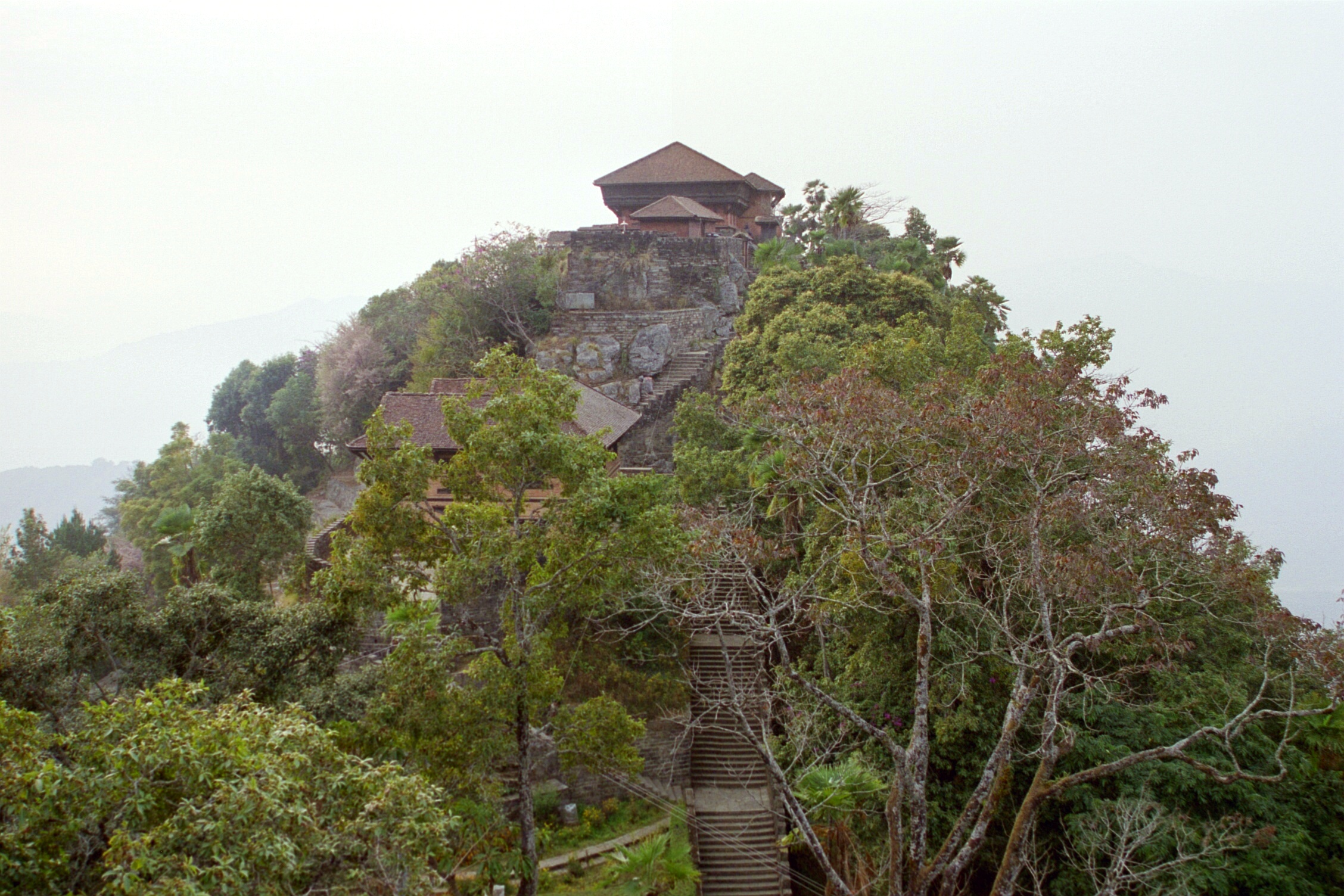
The king's palace on a hill in Gorkha

King Prithvi Narayan Shah, the ruler of the small principality of Gorkha, initially drafted the Gorkhali Army. The Chief of the Gorkhali Army were drawn from Chhetri as well as Magar noble families who were a powerful group of Gorkha, alongside the influential Pande family, Basnyat family and Thapa dynasty before the rule of the Rana dynasty. Gorkha Bhardar Kaji Biraj Thapa Magar was the first Chief of Gorkhali Army in the 18th century, however, the first civilian army chief was Kaji Kalu Pande who had significant role in the campaign of Nepal. He was considered as an army head due to the undertaking of duties and responsibilities of the army but not by the formalization of the title.

==== Battle of Nuwakot ====
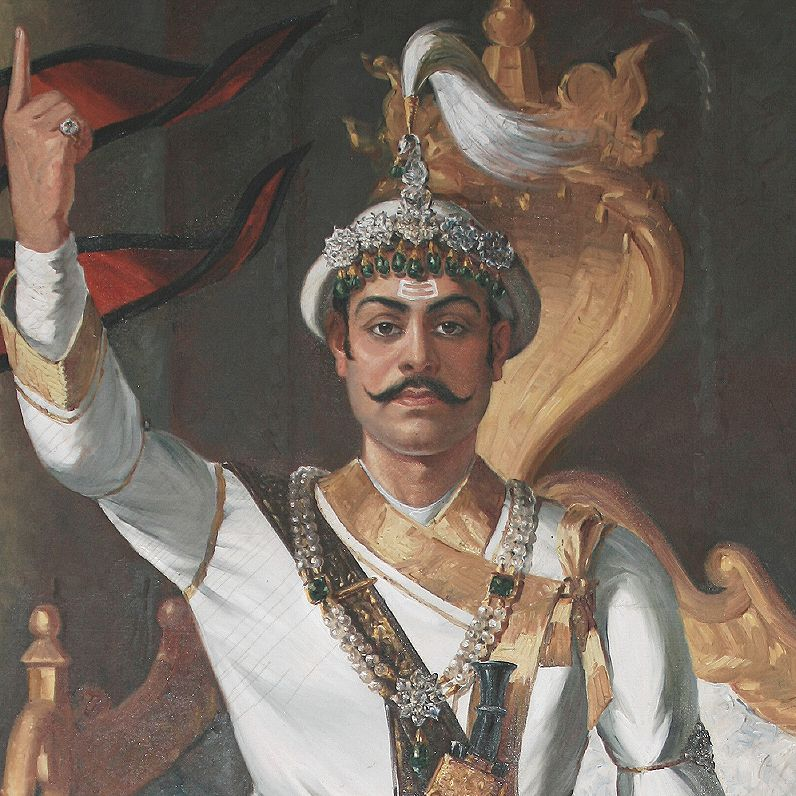
King Prithvi Narayan Shah, the last king of the Gorkha Kingdom and the first king of the Kingdom of Nepal

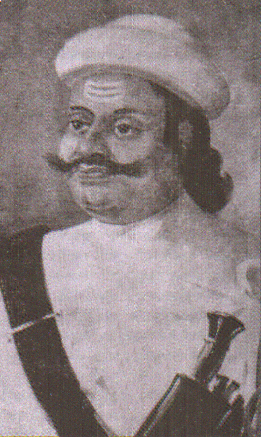
Kalu Pande, a Kaji during the Gorkha Kingdom and commander of Gorkhali forces at victorious battle of Nuwakot

The first battle by Gorkhali forces united under King Prithvi Narayan Shah was the Battle of Nuwakot. The first army commander was Kaji Kalu Pande of the Pande noble family of Gorkha and Jayant Rana Magar (former Kaji of Gorkha) was appointed General by King of Kantiur Jaya Prakash Malla to defend Nuwakot against Gorkha. Pande put up tactics to attack Nuwakot, a strategic fort of Malla king of Kathmandu, from multiple sides by surprise. On 26 September 1744, Pande with a contingent of soldiers climbed from the northern side of Nuwakot city at Mahamandal. He led the surprise attack with a Gorkhali war cry of "Jai Kali, Jai Gorakhnath, Jai Manakamana". The panicked soldiers of Nuwakot under commander Shankha Mani Rana Magar (son of Jayant Rana Magar) tried to defend but lost after their commander was killed by the 13-year-old Prince Dal Mardan Shah, brother of the king. The second contingent of Gorkhali forces led by Chautariya Mahoddam Kirti Shah (also a brother of the king) passed Dharampani and faced strong tussle but ultimately won over the defenders. The third part of the forces, led by the king himself, advanced to the fort of Nuwakotgadhi after the capture of Mahamandal. The soldiers panicked by death of their commander fled to Belkot (Jayant Rana Magar second fort) from the Nuwakot fort and Nuwakot was annexed by Gorkha.

==== Battle of Kirtipur ====
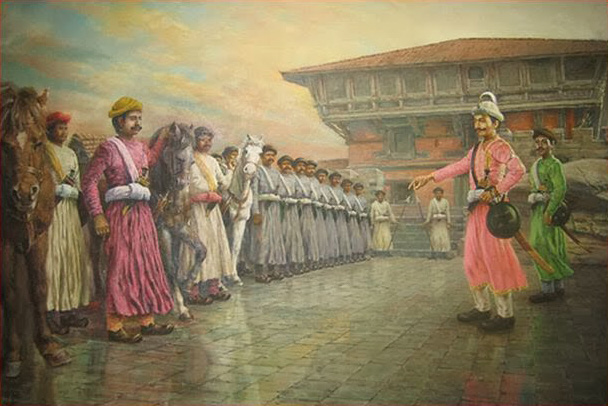
Gorkhali soldiers preparing for war against the Kathmandu Valley

Despite his initial resentment that the valley kings were well prepared and the Gorkhalis were not, Kaji Kalu Pande agreed for a battle against the kingdom of Kirtipur in the Kathmandu Valley on being insisted by the king. The Gorkhalis had set up a base in Naikap to mount their assaults on Kirtipur. They were armed with swords, bows and arrows and muskets. The two forces fought on the plain of Tyangla Phant in the northwest of Kirtipur. Surapratap Shah, the king's brother, lost his right eye to an arrow while scaling the city wall. The Gorkhali commander Kaji Kalu Pande was surrounded and killed, and the Gorkhali king himself narrowly escaped with his life into the surrounding hills disguised as a saint. In 1767, King Prithvi Narayan Shah sent his army to attack Kirtipur for a third time under the command of Surapratap. In response, the three kings of the valley joined forces and sent their troops to the relief of Kirtipur, but they could not dislodge the Gorkhalis from their positions. A noble of Lalitpur named Danuvanta crossed over to Shah's side and treacherously let the Gorkhalis into the town.

==== Annexation of Makwanpur and Hariharpur ====
King Digbardhan Sen and his minister Kanak Singh Baniya had already sent their families to safer grounds before the encirclement of their fortress. The Gorkhalis launched an attack on 21 August 1762. The battle lasted for eight hours. King Digbardhan and Kanak Singh escaped to Hariharpurgadhi. Makawanpur was thus annexed by the Gorkhali forces.

After occupying the Makawanpurgadhi fort, the Gorkhali forces started planning for an attack on Hariharpurgadhi, a strategic fort on a mountain ridge of the Mahabharat range south of Kathmandu. It controlled the route to the Kathmandu valley. At the dusk of 4 October 1762, the Gorkhalis launched an attack. The soldiers at Hariharpurgadhi fought valiantly against the Gorkhali forces but were ultimately forced to vacate the Gadhi (fort) after midnight. About 500 soldiers of Hariharpur died in the battle. Mir Qasim, the Nawab of Bengal extended his help to kings of Kathmandu valley with his forces to attack the Gorkhali forces. On 20 January 1763, Gorkhali commander Vamsharaj Pande won the battle against Mir Qasim. Similarly, Captain Kinloch of British East India Company also extended his support by sending contingents against Gorkhalis. King Prithvi Narayan sent Kaji Vamsharaj Pande, Naahar Singh Basnyat, Jeeva Shah, Ram Krishna Kunwar and others to defeat the forces of Gurgin Khan at Makwanpur.

==== Conquest of Kathmandu Valley and Declaration of Kingdom of Nepal ====
The victory in the Battle of Kirtipur climaxed Shah's two-decade-long effort to take possession of the wealthy Kathmandu Valley. After the fall of Kirtipur, Shah took over the cities of Kathmandu and Lalitpur in 1768 and Bhaktapur in 1769, completing his conquest of the valley. In a letter to Ram Krishna Kunwar, King Prithvi Narayan Shah expressed his unhappiness at the death of Kaji Kalu Pande in Kirtipur and thought it was impossible to conquer Kathmandu Valley after the death of Kalu Pande. After the annexation of Kathmandu Valley, King Prithvi Narayan Shah praised in his letter about the valour and wisdom shown by Kunwar in the annexation of Kathmandu, Lalitpur and Bhaktapur (collectively known as Nepal valley at the time). Vamsharaj Pande, Kalu Pande's eldest son, was the commander of the Gorkhali forces who led the attack during the Battle of Bhaktapur on 14 April 1769.

==== Conquest of the Kirata ====
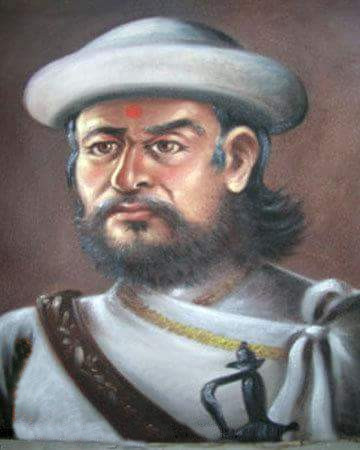
Abhiman Singh Basnyat, a military commander and later Mulkaji

King Prithvi Narayan Shah had deployed Sardar Ram Krishna Kunwar to the invasion of Kirata regional areas comprising; Pallo Kirant (Limbuwan), Wallo Kirant and Majh Kirant (Khambuwan). On B.S. 1829 Bhadra 13 (i.e. 29 August 1772), Kunwar crossed the Dudhkoshi river to invade King Karna Sen of the Majh Kirant (Khambuwan) and Saptari region with fellow commander Abhiman Singh Basnyat. He then crossed the Arun river to reach Chainpur (Limbuwan), where he later achieved victory over the Kiratas. King Prithvi Narayan Shah bestowed 22 pairs of Shirpau (special headgear) in appreciation to Ram Krishna Kunwar after his victory over the Kirata region.

==== Political conflicts ====
In 1775, the King Prithvi Narayan Shah, who expanded the Gorkha Kingdom into the Kingdom of Nepal, died in Nuwakot. Swarup Singh Karki, a shrewd Gorkhali courtier from a Chhetri family of eastern Nepal, marched with an army to Nuwakot to confine Prince Bahadur Shah who was then mourning the death of his father. He confined Bahadur Shah and Dal Mardan Shah with the consent from newly reigning King Pratap Singh Shah who was considered to have no distinction of right and wrong. In the annual Pajani (renewal) of that year, Swarup Singh was promoted to the position of Kaji along with Abhiman Singh Basnyat, Amar Singh Thapa and Parashuram Thapa. In Falgun 1832 B.S., he succeeded in exiling Bahadur Shah, Dal Mardan Shah and Guru Gajraj Mishra on three heinous charges. The reign of Pratap Singh Shah was characterized by the constant rivalry between Swarup Singh and Vamsharaj Pande. The document dated B.S. 1833 Bhadra 3 Roj 6 (i.e. Friday, 2 August 1776), shows that he had carried the title of Dewan along with Vamsharaj Pande. King Pratap Singh Shah died on 22 November 1777 with his infant son Rana Bahadur Shah succeeding as the King of Nepal. Sarbajit Rana Magar was made a Kaji along with Balbhadra Shah and Vamsharaj Pande while Daljit Shah was chosen as Chief Chautariya. Historian Dilli Raman Regmi asserts that Sarbajit Rana Magar was chosen as Mulkaji (equivalent to Prime Minister), while historian Rishikesh Shah asserts that Sarbajit Rana was the head of the Nepalese government only for a short period in 1778. Afterwards, rivalry arose between Prince Bahadur Shah and Queen Rajendra Laxmi. Sarbajit Rana led the followers of the Queen opposed to Sriharsh Pant who led the followers of Bahadur Shah. The group of Bharadars (officers) led by Sarbajit badmouthed Rajendra Laxmi against Bahadur Shah. Queen Rajendra Laxmi succeeded in the confinement of Bahadur Shah with the help of her new minister Sarbajit Rana Magar. Guru Gajraj Mishra came to the rescue of Bahadur Shah on a condition that Bahadur Shah should leave the country. Also, his rival Sriharsh Pant was branded outcast and expelled instead of being executed as execution was prohibited for Brahmins.

Prince Bahadur Shah confined his sister-in-law Queen Rajendra Laxmi on the charge of having illicit relation with Sarbajit Rana Magar on 31 August 1778. Subsequently, Sarbajit was executed inside the palace by Bahadur Shah with the help of male servants of the royal palace. Historian Bhadra Ratna Bajracharya asserts that it was actually Chautariya Daljit Shah who led the opposing group against Sarbajit Rana Magar and Queen Rajendra Rajya Laxmi Devi. The letter dated B.S. 1835 Bhadra 11 Roj 4 (1778) to Narayan Malla and Vrajabasi Pande asserts the death of Sarbajit under misconduct and the appointment of Bahadur Shah as regent. The death of Sarbajit Rana Magar is considered to have marked the initiation of court conspiracies and massacres in the newly unified Kingdom of Nepal. Historian Baburam Acharya points that the sanctions against Queen Rajendra Laxmi under moral misconduct was a mistake of Bahadur Shah. Similarly, the murder of Sarbajit Rana Magar was condemned by many historians as an act of injustice.

Vamsharaj Pande, once Dewan of Nepal and son of the popular commander Kalu Pande, was beheaded on the allegations of conspiring with Queen Rajendra Laxmi. In a special tribunal meeting at Bhandarkhal garden east of Kathmandu Durbar, Swaroop Singh held Vamsharaj liable for letting the King of Parbat, Kirtibam Malla, run away in the battle a year ago. He had a fiery conversation with Vamsharaj before Vamsharaj was declared guilty and was subsequently executed by beheading on the tribunal. Historian Rishikesh Shah and Ganga Karmacharya claim that he was executed in March 1785, whereas Bhadra Ratna Bajracharya and Tulsi Ram Vaidya claim that he was executed on 21 April 1785. On 2 July 1785, Swaroop Singh's opponent Prince Regent Bahadur Shah was arrested, but on the eleventh day of imprisonment, on 13 July, Singh's only supporter Queen Rajendra Laxmi died. Then onwards, Bahadur Shah took over the regency of his nephew King Rana Bahadur Shah and as one of his first orders as the regent, he ordered Swaroop Singh, who was then in Pokhara, to be beheaded there on the charges of treason. Singh had gone to Kaski to join Daljit Shah's military campaign of Kaski fearing retaliation of the old courtiers due to his conspiracy against Vamsharaj. He was executed on B.S. 1842 Shrawan 24.

==== Tibetan conflict ====
After the death of Prithvi Narayan Shah, the Shah dynasty began to expand their kingdom into what is present-day North India. Between 1788 and 1791, Nepal invaded Tibet and robbed Tashi Lhunpo Monastery of Shigatse. Tibet sought Chinese help and the Qianlong Emperor of the Chinese Qing Dynasty appointed Fuk'anggan commander-in-chief of the Tibetan campaign. Heavy damages were inflicted on both sides. The Nepali forces retreated step by step back to Nuwakot to stretch Sino-Tibetan forces uncomfortably. Chinese launched an uphill attack during the daylight and failed to succeed due to a strong counterattack with khukuri at Nuwakot. The Chinese army suffered a major setback when they tried to cross a monsoon-flooded Betrawati, close to the Gorkhali palace in Nuwakot. A stalemate ensued when Fuk'anggan was keen to protect his troops and wanted to negotiate at Nuwakot.

=== 19th century ===
==== Dominance of Damodar Pande ====
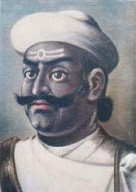
Damodar Pande, Mulkaji of Nepal from the Pande aristocratic family

Damodar Pande was appointed as one of the four Kajis by King Rana Bahadur Shah after the removal of Chautariya Bahadur Shah in 1794. Pande was the most influential and dominant amongst the court factions in spite of the post of Mulkaji being held by Kirtiman Singh Basnyat. Pandes were the most dominant noble family. Later due to the continuous irrational behaviour of King Rana Bahadur Shah, a situation of civil war arose where Damodar was the main opposition to the King. He was forced to flee to the British-controlled city of Varanasi in May 1800 after the military parted with influential Kaji Damodar Pande. After Queen Rajrajeshwari finally managed to assume the regency on 17 December 1802, later in February she appointed Damodar Pande as the Mulkaji.

After Rana Bahadur's reinstatement to power, he ordered Damodar Pande, along with his two eldest sons, who were completely innocent, to be executed on 13 March 1804; similarly, some members of his faction were tortured and executed without any due trial, while many others managed to escape to India. Among those who managed to escape to India were Damodar Pande's sons Karbir Pande and Rana Jang Pande. After Damodar Pande's execution, Ranajit Pande who was his paternal cousin, was appointed Mulkaji along with Bhimsen Thapa as second Kaji, Sher Bahadur Shah as Mul Chautariya and Ranganath Paudel as Raj Guru (Royal Preceptor).

==== Thapa Regime ====
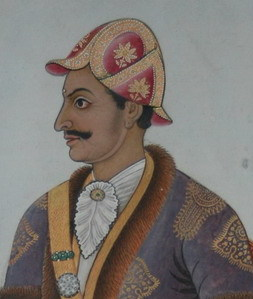
Mukhtiyar Bhimsen Thapa, founder of Khas Thapa dynasty

Thapa courtiers, who were Kshatriya, rose to power when the King Rana Bahadur Shah was murdered by his half brother Sher Bahadur Shah in 1806. Bhimsen Thapa (1775–1839), the leading Thapa Kaji, taking opportunity of the occasion massacred nearly 55 military and civil officers and catapulting the Thapas into the power. He took the title of Mukhtiyar succeeding Rana Bahadur as the chief authority and his niece Queen Tripurasundari as Queen Regent of junior King Girvan Yuddha Bikram Shah.

==== Anglo-Nepalese War ====
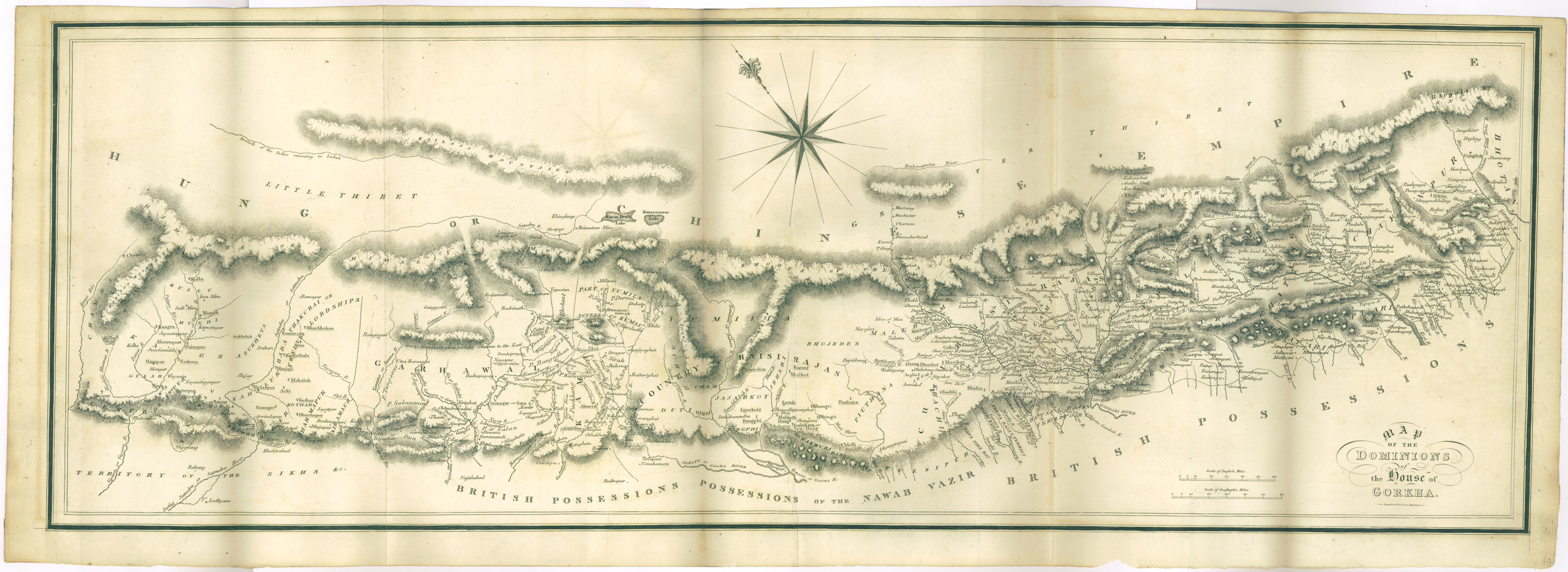
Dominions of the House of Gorkha by Francis Buchanan-Hamilton, published in 1819

Map illustration of Nepal prior to the Treaty of Sugauli, showing 111 kingdoms, 424 forts, 42 trade nodes, and 149 mines within the dominions of the House of Gorkha

Rivalry between Nepal and the East India Company—over the princely states bordering Nepal and India—eventually led to the Anglo-Nepalese War (1814–16). The Treaty of Sugauli was signed in 1816, ceding large parts of the Nepali territories of the Terai and Sikkim, which accounted to nearly one-third of the country, to the East India Company in exchange for Nepalese autonomy. As the territories were not restored to Nepal by the British government when India became independent from British rule, most of these lands later became a part of the Republic of India. Sikkim remained independent until annexed into India in 1975 when it becomes the 22nd state of the Republic of India. However, in 1860 the British returned the authority over some of Nepal's land in the Terai back to Nepal (known as Naya Muluk, new country) as an act of gratitude for Nepalese support to Britain during the Indian Rebellion of 1857.

==== Rana Regime ====
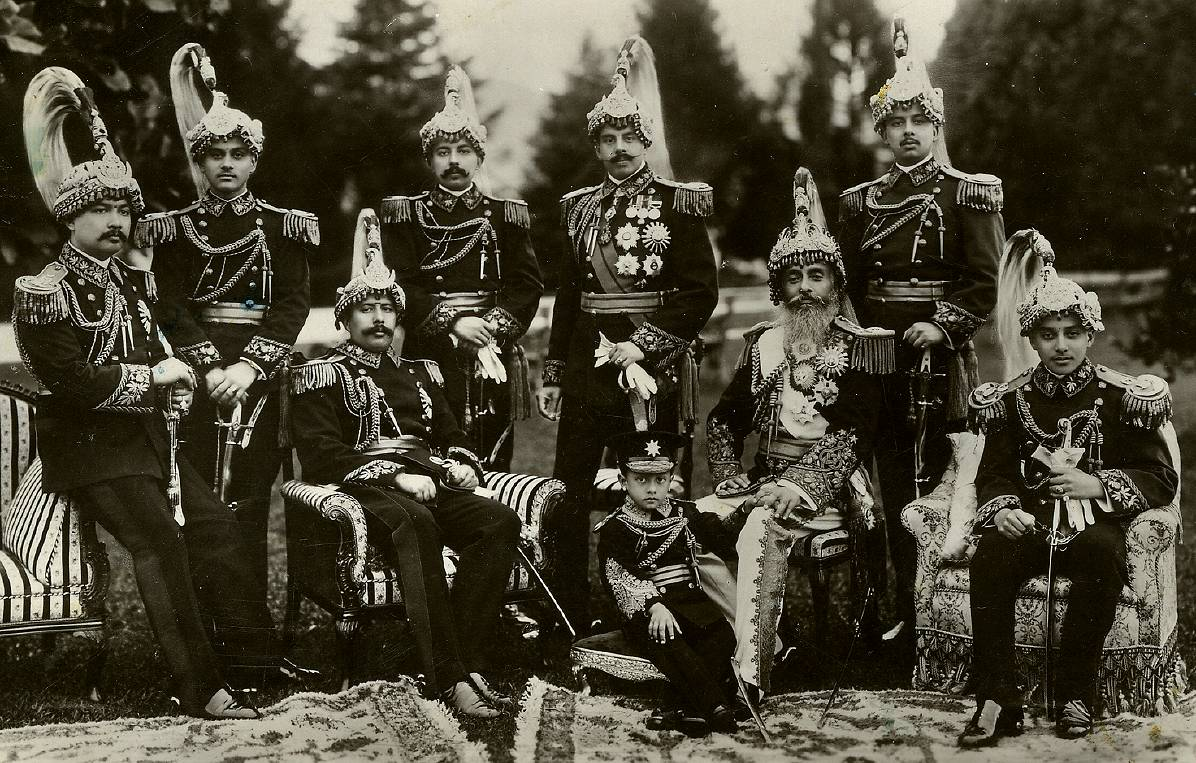
Maharaja of Kaski and Lamjung and Prime Minister of Nepal Chandra Shamsher Jang Bahadur Rana and his 8 sons who were one of the most powerful factions of Ranas of Nepal

Factionalism among the royal family led to a period of instability after the war. In 1846, Queen Rajya Lakshmi Devi plotted to overthrow Jang Bahadur Rana, a fast-rising military leader who was presenting a threat to her power. The plot was uncovered and the queen had several hundred princes and chieftains executed after an armed clash between military personnel and administrators loyal to the queen. This came to be known as the Kot Massacre. However, Jung Bahadur emerged victorious eventually and founded the Rana dynasty; the monarch was made a titular figure, and the post of Prime Minister was made powerful and hereditary, held by the Ranas.

==== Third Nepalese Tibet War ====
Jung Bahadur Rana sent forces under his brothers Bam Bahadur Kunwar and Dhir Shamsher Rana to attack Tibet again to achieve complete victory. His forces succeeded in defeating Tibetan forces on two sides. The Tibetan team arrived in January 1856 to sign a treaty. After a month, the Treaty of Thapathali was signed which was more favourable to Nepal.

=== 20th century ===
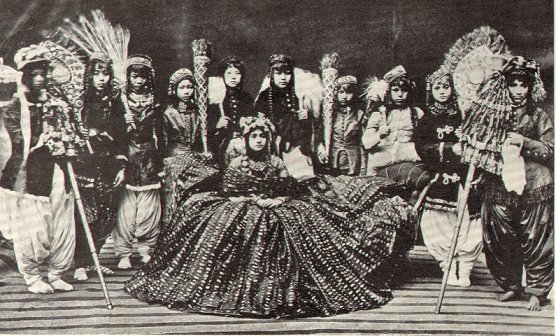
Rani (Queen) of Nepal surrounded by her Ladies-in-Waiting, 1920

==== Nepal and the British ====
The Rana regime, a tightly centralized autocracy, pursued a policy of isolating Nepal from external influences. This policy helped Nepal maintain its national independence during the British colonial era, but it also impeded the country's economic development and modernisation. The Ranas were staunchly pro-British and assisted the British during the Indian Rebellion of 1857 and later in both World Wars. At the same time, despite Chinese claims, the British supported Nepalese independence at the beginning of the twentieth century.

In December 1923, Britain and Nepal formally signed a treaty of perpetual peace and friendship superseding the Sugauli Treaty of 1816 and upgrading the British resident in Kathmandu to an envoy. Slavery was abolished in Nepal in 1924.

==== Democratic reform ====
Popular dissatisfaction against the family rule of the Ranas had started emerging from among the few educated people, who had studied in various Indian schools and colleges, and also from within the Ranas, many of whom were marginalised within the ruling Rana hierarchy. Many of these Nepalese in exile had actively taken part in the Indian Independence struggle and wanted to liberate Nepal as well from the internal autocratic Rana occupation. The political parties such as the Praja Parishad and Nepali Congress were already formed in exile by leaders such as B.P. Koirala, Ganesh Man Singh, Subarna Shamsher Rana, Krishna Prasad Bhattarai, Girija Prasad Koirala and many other patriotic-minded Nepalis who urged the military and popular political movement in Nepal to overthrow the autocratic Rana Regime. Among the prominent martyrs to die for the cause, executed at the hands of the Ranas, were Dharma Bhakta Mathema, Shukraraj Shastri, Gangalal Shrestha and Dasharath Chand. This turmoil culminated in King Tribhuvan, a direct descendant of Prithvi Narayan Shah, fleeing from his 'palace prison' in 1950, to the newly independent India, touching off an armed revolt against the Rana administration. This eventually ended in the return of the Shah family to power and the appointment of a non-Rana as prime minister. A period of the quasi-constitutional rule followed, during which the monarch, assisted by the leaders of fledgling political parties, governed the country. During the 1950s, efforts were made to frame a constitution for Nepal that would establish a representative form of government, based on a British model.

In early 1959, Tribhuvan's son King Mahendra issued a new constitution, and the first democratic elections for a national assembly were held. The Nepali Congress, a moderate socialist group, gained a substantial victory in the election. Its leader, B.P. Koirala, formed a government and served as prime minister. After a period of power wrangling between the king and the elected government, Mahendra dissolved the democratic experiment in 1960.

==== King Mahendra's new constitution ====
Declaring the contemporary parliament a failure, King Mahendra in 1960 dismissed the Koirala government, declared that a "party-less" Panchayat system would govern Nepal, and promulgated another new constitution on 16 December 1962.

Subsequently, the Prime Minister, members of parliament and hundreds of democratic activists were arrested. In fact, this trend of the arrest of political activists and democratic supporters continued for the entire 30-year period of the partyless Panchayat system under King Mahendra and then his son, King Birendra.

The new constitution established a "partyless" system of panchayats (councils), which King Mahendra considered to be a democratic form of government, closer to Nepalese traditions. As a pyramidal structure, progressing from village assemblies to a Rastriya Panchayat (National Parliament), the panchayat system constitutionalised the absolute power of the monarchy and kept the King as head of state with sole authority over all governmental institutions, including the cabinet (council of ministers) and the parliament. One-state-one-language became the national policy, and all other languages suffered at the cost of the official language, Nepali, which was the king's language.

King Mahendra was succeeded by his 27-year-old son, King Birendra, in 1972. Amid student demonstrations and anti-regime activities in 1979, King Birendra called for a national referendum to decide on the nature of Nepal's government: either the continuation of the panchayat system with democratic reforms or the establishment of a multiparty system. The referendum was held in May 1980, and the Panchayat system won a narrow victory. The king carried out the promised reforms, including a selection of the prime minister by the Rashtriya Panchayat.

=== End of Panchayat system ===
There was resentment against the authoritarian regime and the curbs on the freedom of the political parties. There was a widespread feeling of the palace being non-representative of the masses, especially when the Marich Man Singh government faced political scandals on charges of misappropriation of funds allotted for the victims of the earthquake in August 1988 or when it reshuffled the cabinet instead of investigating the death of people in a stampede in the national sports complex during a hailstorm. The souring of the India-Nepal trade relations during this period also affected the popularity of the Singh government.

In April 1987, Nepal had introduced the work permit for Indian workers in three of its districts, and in early 1989, Nepal provided 40% duty concession to Chinese goods and later withdrew duty concessions from Indian goods in such a manner that the Chinese goods became cheaper than the Indian goods. This led to the souring of relations which were already strained over the purchase of Chinese arms by Nepal in 1988. India refused to renew two separate Treaties of Trade and Transit and insisted on a single treaty dealing with the two issues, which was not acceptable to Nepal. A deadlock ensued and the Treaties of Trade and Transit expired on 23 March 1989. The brunt of the closure of the trade and transit points was mainly faced by the lower classes in Nepal due to the restricted supply of consumer goods and petroleum products such as petrol, aviation fuel and kerosene. The industries suffered because of their dependence on India for resources, trade and transit. The Government of Nepal tried to deal with the situation by depending on foreign aid from the US, UK, Australia and China. However, the government's strategy to manage the crisis could not satisfy those people who desired negotiations with India rather than dependence on foreign aid as a solution.

Taking advantage of the uneasiness created against the government and the strained India-Nepal relations for their mishandling of the crisis, the Nepali Congress (NC) and the left-wing parties blamed the government for perpetuating the crisis and not taking any serious measures to solve it. In December 1989, the NC tried to utilise B.P. Koirala's anniversary by launching a people's awareness program. The left-wing alliance known as the United Left Front (ULF) extended its support to the NC in its campaign for a party system. On 18–19 January 1990, the NC held a conference in which leaders from various countries and members of the foreign Press were invited. Leaders from India attended the conference; Germany, Japan, Spain, Finland supported the movement; and the Embassies of the US and West Germany were present on the occasion. Inspired by the international support and the democratic movements occurring throughout the world after the disintegration of the Soviet Union in 1989, the NC and the ULF launched a mass movement on 18 February to end the Panchayat regime and the installation of an interim government represented by various parties and people.

On 6 April the Marich Man Singh government was dismissed and Lokendra Bahadur Chand became the Prime Minister on the same day. However, the agitated mob were not satisfied with the change of government as they didn't oppose the Singh government but the party-less system in general. On 16 April the Chand government was also dismissed and a Royal Proclamation was issued the next day which dissolved the National Panchayat, the Panchayat policy and the evaluation committee and the class organisations. Instead, the proclamation declared "functioning of the political parties" and maintained that "all political parties will always keep the national interest uppermost in organising themselves according to their political ideology."

During this protest, many civilians were killed and after the end of Panchayat rule, they were seen as 'undeclared martyrs'. One of those martyrs was Ram Chandra Hamal, a member of the Nepali Congress who was killed in imprisonment by the government.

=== 1990 People's Movement ===
People in rural areas had expected that their interests would be better represented after the adoption of parliamentary democracy in 1990. The Nepali Congress with the support of "Alliance of leftist parties" decided to launch a decisive agitational movement, Jana Andolan, which forced the monarchy to accept constitutional reforms and to establish a multiparty parliament. In May 1991, Nepal held its first parliamentary elections in nearly 50 years. The Nepali Congress won 110 of the 205 seats and formed the first elected government in 32 years.

==== Civil strife ====
In 1992, in a situation of economic crisis and chaos, with spiraling prices as a result of the implementation of changes in the policy of the new Congress government, the radical left stepped up their political agitation. A Joint People's Agitation Committee was set up by the various groups. A general strike was called for 6 April.

Violent incidents began to occur on the evening before the strike. The Joint People's Agitation Committee had called for a 30-minute 'lights out' in the capital, and violence erupted outside Bir Hospital when activists tried to enforce the 'lights out'. At dawn on 6 April, clashes between strike activists and police, outside a police station in Pulchok (Patan), left two activists dead.

Later in the day, a mass rally of the Agitation Committee at Tundikhel in the capital Kathmandu was attacked by police forces. As a result, riots broke out and the Nepal Telecommunications building was set on fire; police opened fire at the crowd, killing several people. The Human Rights Organization of Nepal estimated that 14 people, including several onlookers, had been killed in police firing.

When promised land reforms failed to appear, people in some districts started to organize to enact their own land reform and to gain some power over their lives in the face of usurious landlords. However, this movement was repressed by the Nepali government, in Operation Romeo and Operation Kilo Sera II, which took the lives of many of the leading activists of the struggle. As a result, many witnesses to this repression became radicalized.

==== Nepalese Civil War ====
In February 1996, one of the Maoist parties started a bid to replace the parliamentary monarchy with a people's new democratic republic, through a Maoist revolutionary strategy known as the people's war, which led to the Nepalese Civil War. Led by Dr. Baburam Bhattarai and Pushpa Kamal Dahal (better known by his nom de guerre "Prachanda"), the insurgency began in five districts in Nepal: Rolpa, Rukum, Jajarkot, Gorkha, and Sindhuli. The Maoists declared the existence of a provisional "people's government" at the district level in several locations.

=== 21st century ===
==== Palace massacre ====
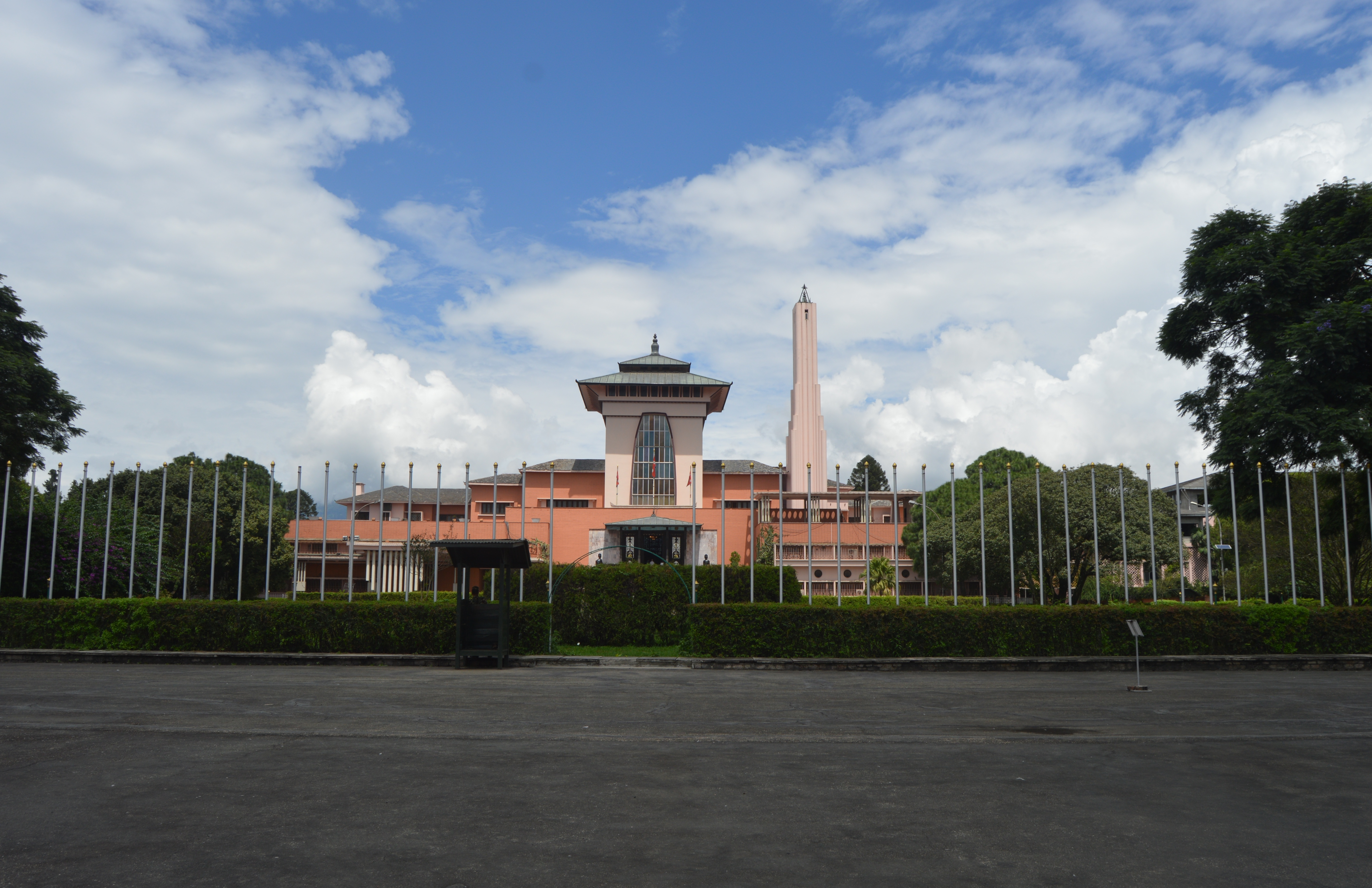
The Narayanhiti Palace where the royal massacre occurred

On June 1, 2001, the Members of the royal families were killed by gunshots including King Birendra Bir Bikram Shah, Queen Aishwarya, Prince Nirajan and Crown Prince Dipendra. Dipendra Shah was blamed. Gyanendra Shah was crowned as the king three days later after the massacre.

Meanwhile, the Maoist rebellion escalated, and in October 2002 the king temporarily deposed the government and took complete control of it. A week later he reappointed another government, but the country was still unstable because of the civil war with the Maoists, the various clamouring political factions, the king's attempts to take more control of the government, and worries about the competence of Gyanendra's son and heir, Prince Paras.

==== Suspension of responsible government ====
In the face of unstable governments and a Maoist siege on the Kathmandu Valley in August 2004, popular support for the monarchy began to wane. On 1 February 2005, Gyanendra dismissed the entire government and took to exercising his executive powers without ministerial advice, declaring a "state of emergency" to quash the Maoist movement. Politicians were placed under house arrest, phone and internet lines were cut, and freedom of the press was severely curtailed.

==== 2006 democracy movement ====
The king's new regime made little progress in his stated aim of suppressing the insurgents. The European Union described the municipal elections of February 2006 as "a backward step for democracy", as the major parties boycotted the election and the army forced some candidates to run for office. In April 2006 strikes and street protests in Kathmandu forced the king to reinstate the parliament. A seven-party coalition resumed control of the government and stripped the king of most of his powers. As of 15 January 2007, a unicameral legislature under an interim constitution governed Nepal.

==== Abolition of the monarchy ====
The Constituent Assembly came to fruition on 24 December 2007 when it was announced that the monarchy would be abolished in 2008 after the Constituent Assembly elections; and on 28 May 2008, Nepal was declared a Federal Democratic Republic.

== Zones, districts, and regions ==
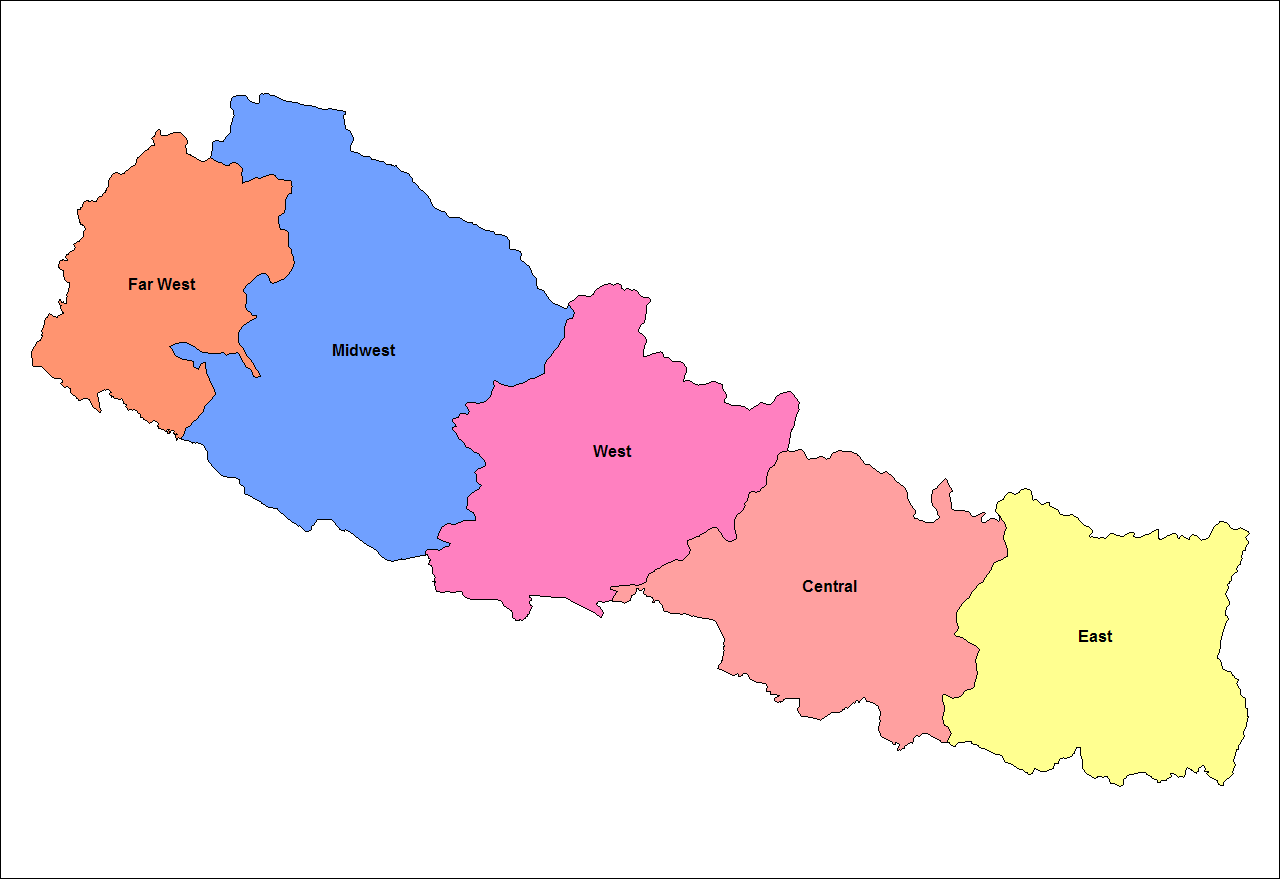
Former division of development region

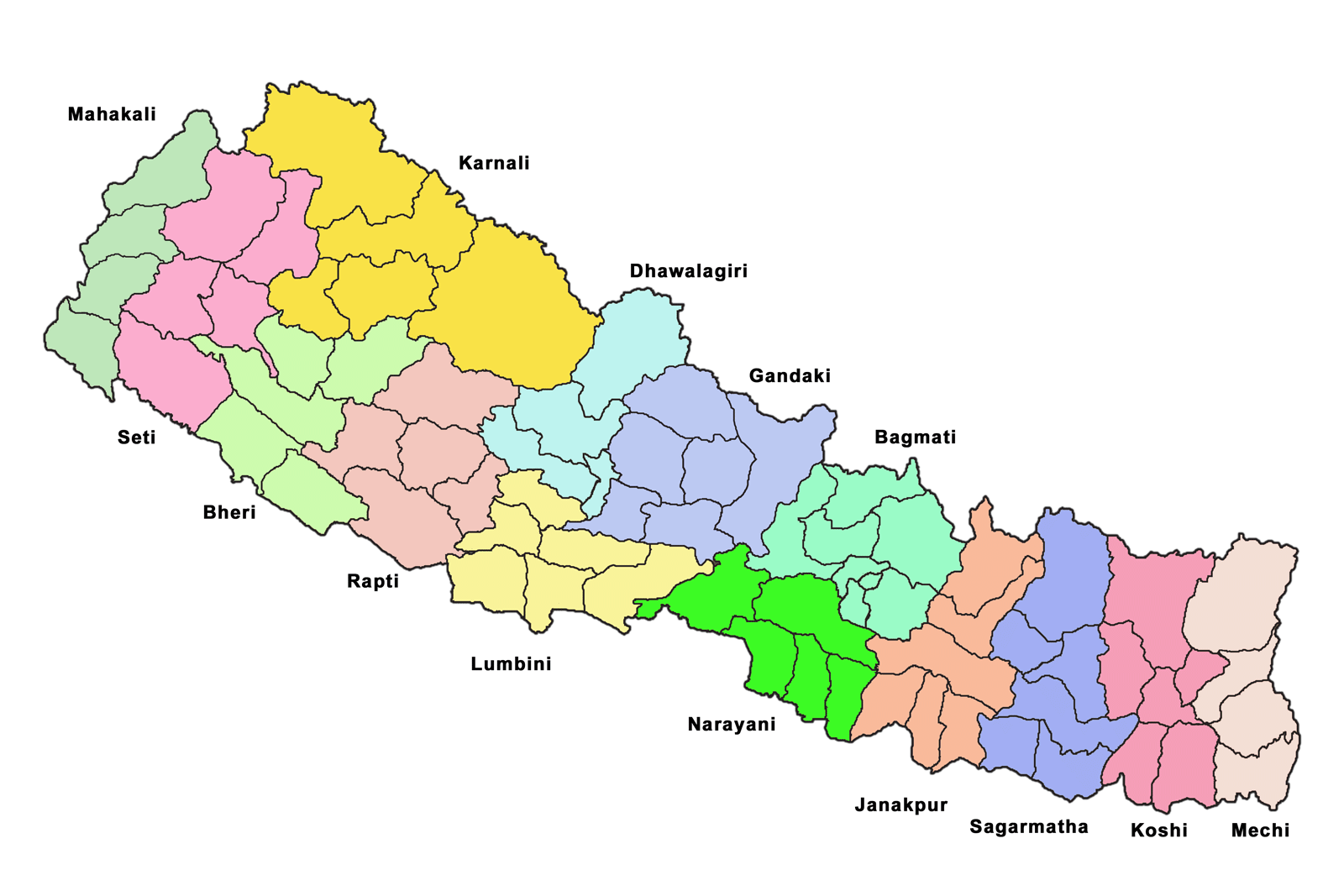
Nepalese zones

Nepal was divided into 14 zones and 75 districts, grouped into 5 development regions:

The five development regions of Nepal were (from east to west):

Former development Regions of Nepal
No.	English name	Nepali name	Zones	Districts (No.)	Headquarters	Population	Area (km^{2})
1	Eastern Development Region	पुर्वाञ्चल विकास क्षेत्र	Mechi; Koshi; Sagarmatha	16	Dhankuta	5,811,555	28,456
2	Central Development Region	मध्यमाञ्चल विकास क्षेत्र	Janakpur; Bagmati; Narayani	19	Kathmandu	9,656,985	27,410
3	Western Development Region	पश्चिमाञ्चल विकास क्षेत्र	Gandaki; Lumbini; Dhaulagiri	16	Pokhara	4,926,765	29,398
4	Mid-Western Development Region	मध्य पश्चिमाञ्चल विकास क्षेत्र	Rapti; Bheri; Karnali	15	Birendranagar	3,546,682	42,378
5	Far-Western Development Region	सुदुर पश्चिमाञ्चल विकास क्षेत्र	Seti; Mahakali	9	Dipayal	2,552,517	19,539

Each district was headed by a fixed chief district officer responsible for maintaining law and order and coordinating the work of field agencies of the various government ministries. The 14 zones were:

- Bagmati
- Bheri
- Dhaulagiri
- Gandaki
- Janakpur
- Karnali
- Koshi
- Lumbini
- Mahakali
- Mechi
- Narayani
- Rapti
- Sagarmatha
- Seti

== Government and politics ==
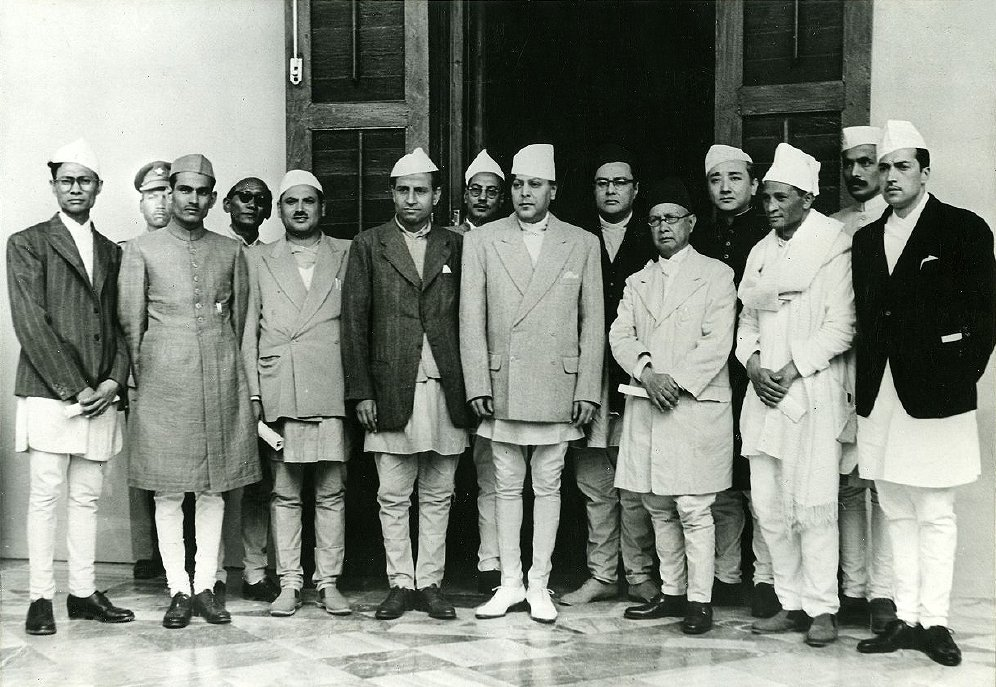
The Nepali Congress leader with King Tribhuvan and Nepali prime minister in a meeting, 1951

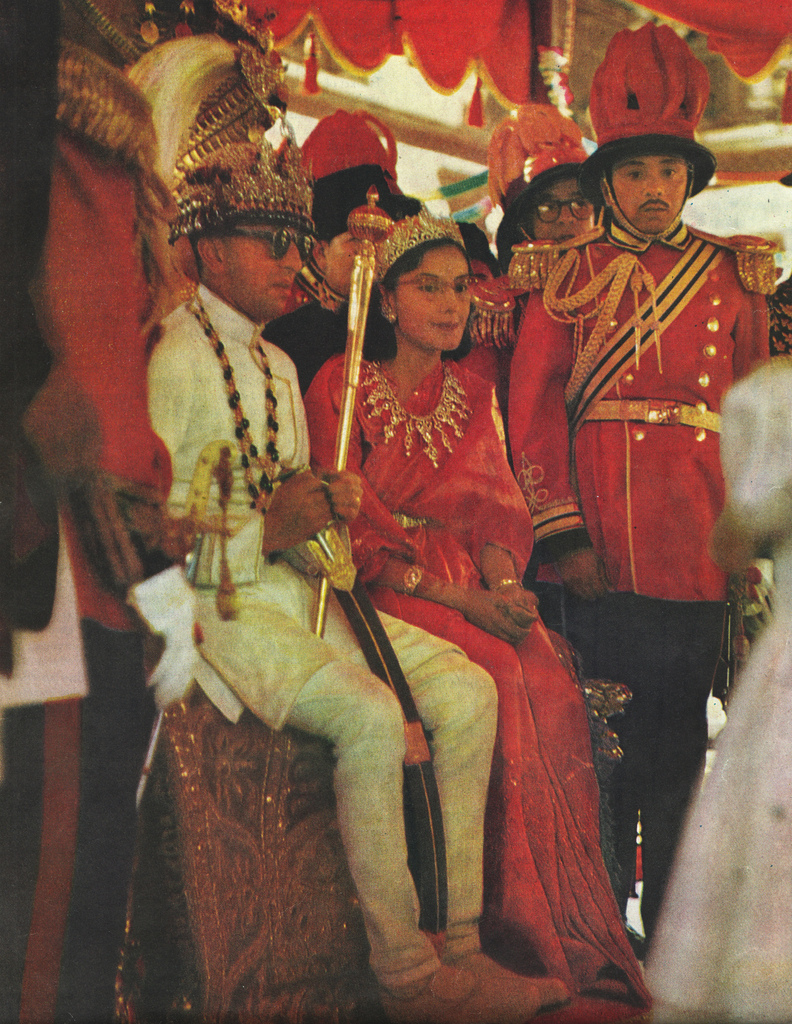
Mahendra of Nepal in coronation, 1955

Until 1990, Nepal was an absolute monarchy running under the executive control of the king. Faced with a people's movement against the absolute monarchy, King Birendra, in 1990, agreed to large-scale political reforms by creating a parliamentary monarchy with the king as the head of state and a prime minister as the head of the government.

Nepal's legislature was bicameral consisting of a House of Representatives and a National Council. The House of Representatives consists of 205 members directly elected by the people. The National Council had sixty members, ten nominated by the king, thirty-five elected by the House of Representatives and the remaining fifteen elected by an electoral college made up of chairs of villages and towns. The legislature had a five-year term but was dissolvable by the king before its term could end. All Nepali citizens 18 years and older became eligible to vote.

The executive comprised the King and the Council of Ministers (the Cabinet). The leader of the coalition or party securing the maximum seats in an election was appointed as the Prime Minister. The Cabinet was appointed by the king on the recommendation of the Prime Minister. Governments in Nepal have tended to be highly unstable; no government has survived for more than two years since 1991, either through internal collapse or parliamentary dissolution by the monarch on the recommendation of the prime minister according to the constitution.

The movement in April 2006 brought about a change in the nation. The autocratic King was forced to give up power. The dissolved House of Representatives was restored. The House of Representatives formed a government that had successful peace talks with the Maoist Rebels. An interim constitution was promulgated and an interim House of Representatives was formed with Maoist members. The number of seats was also increased to 330. The peace process in Nepal made a giant leap in April 2007, when the Communist Party of Nepal (Maoist) joined the interim government of Nepal.

== Gallery ==
=== Historical arms ===
Gallery of the Emblems of Nepal.
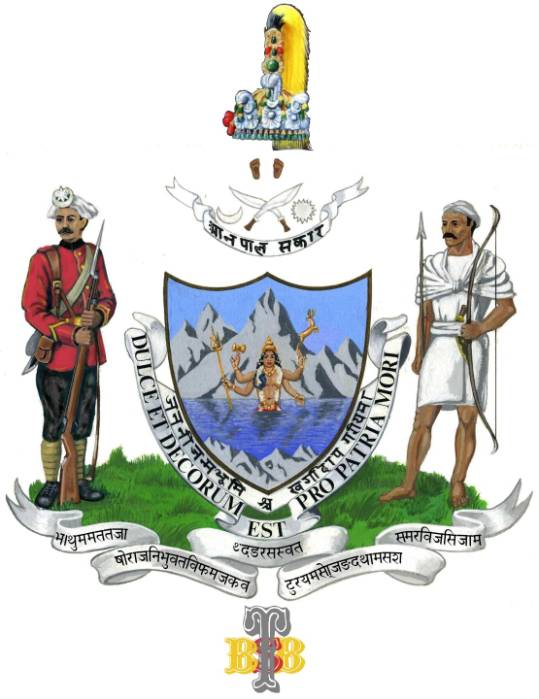
Coat of arms of the Kingdom of Nepal (1935)

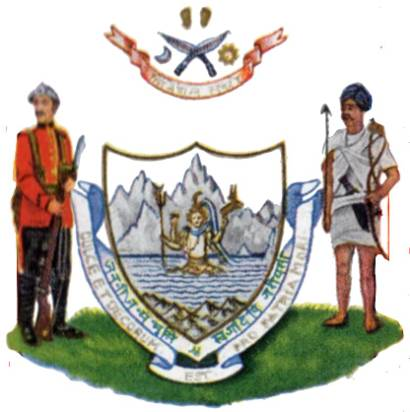
Coat of arms of the Kingdom of Nepal (1935–1946)

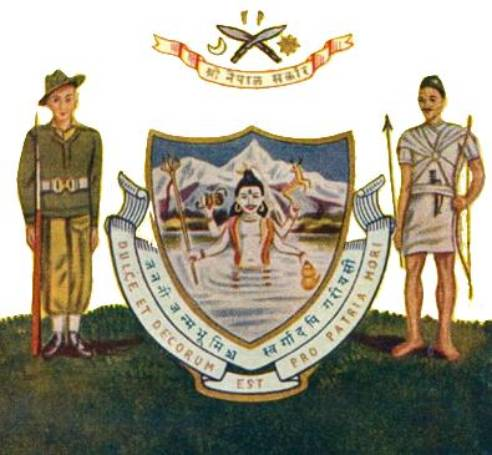
Coat of arms of the Kingdom of Nepal (1946–1962)

Coat of arms of the Kingdom of Nepal (1962–2008)

=== Historical flag ===
Gallery of the flags of Nepal.
Flag of Nepal (1856–c. 1930)

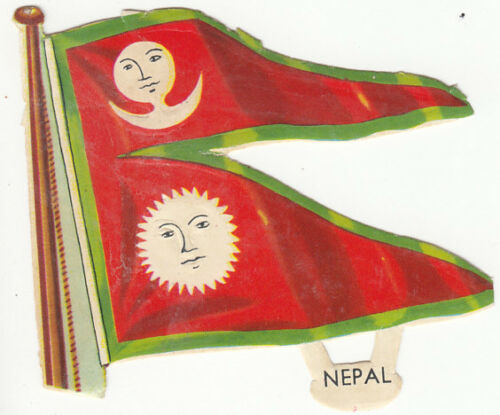
The flag of Nepal 1927-1930

Flag of Nepal (c. 1930–1962)
