= Dhakal =

Nepalese Brahmin surname

Dhakal ढकाल
- Language: Nepali, Doteli

Origin
- Language: Khas language
- Origin: Khasa kingdom

Other names
- Derivative: Jaisi Dhakal
- See also: Ghimire, Poudel, Pokharel, Khanal, Aryal, Subedi

Dhakal (Nepali: ढकाल pronounced [ɖʱʌkal]) is a Bahun (बाहुन) and Kshetri (क्षेत्री) surname found in Nepal and in some parts of India, including Uttarakhand and Sikkim. Bearers of the surname are Pahari and of Indo-Aryan origin.

== Origins ==
The Dhakals are believed to be direct descendants of the Rishi (or sage) Upamanyu, who is in turn believed to be descended from the Rishi Vasishta. The family is believed to have originated from a place called Dhapuk in Achham District.

== Migration and settlement ==
Dhakals from mid-western Nepal migrated eastward, settling in areas including Syanja and Gorkha, and continuing as far as eastern Nepal. Syanja, Terathum, Bhojpur, and Gorkha are well-known places from which many Dhakals have emerged. Yaku in Bhojpur is known as the Birta of the Dhakals.

In Sikkim, the Dhakals first settled in the lower parts of the kingdom and later migrated towards the capital in order to rear cattle.

== Historical role ==
Dhakals were engaged in the priestly and astrological work traditionally performed by Bahun priests in the Kingdom of Gorkha. The astrologer Kulananda Dhakal is recorded as having counselled King Prithvi Narayan Shah before war.

== Culture ==
Dhakal culture is part of the traditional Nepali Hindu Brahmin culture.

== Notable people ==
- Baburam Dhakal (born 1979), Nepalese film director
- Biswas Dhakal (born 1981), Nepalese entrepreneur
- Ek Nath Dhakal (born 1974), Nepalese politician
- Hari Dhakal (born 1981), member of the House of Representatives in 2022
- Janardan Dhakal, Nepalese politician from Rasuwa
- Kulananda Dhakal, chief priest and astrologer of the 18th-century ruler Prithvi Narayan Shah
- Ramnath Dhakal (1962–2015), Nepalese politician
- Rishi Dhakal, US-based Nepalese businessman and honorary Consul General of Nepal in California, United States
- Sagar Dhakal, Nepalese politician
- Sagar Dhakal, Nepalese cricketer
- Shobhakar Dhakal, head of the Department of Energy, Environment and Climate Change at the Asian Institute of Technology, Thailand
- Shyam Dhakal (born 1981), Nepalese alpine skier

== See also ==
- Bahun
- Khas people
