= Battle of Belkot =

Battle fought in Nepal in 1744

- Part of the Unification of Nepal
Date	1744
Location	Belkot
Result	Gorkhali victory
Territorial changes	Belkot force ceded Belkot

Belligerents
Gorkha Kingdom	Kingdom of Belkot

Commanders and leaders
Prithvi Narayan Shah	Jayant Rana

Casualties and losses
More than 60 Gorkhali soldier dead	

Battle of Belkot was fought in Belkot fort in 1744 a few days after the Battle of Nuwakot, part of the Unification of Nepal. It resulted in a Gorkhali victory, and the commander Jayant Rana Magar was captured and flayed alive after ordering to be skinned alive by Prithvi Narayan Shah, first King of Nepal.
