= Biswas Dhakal =

Nepali serial entrepreneur

- विश्वास ढकाल
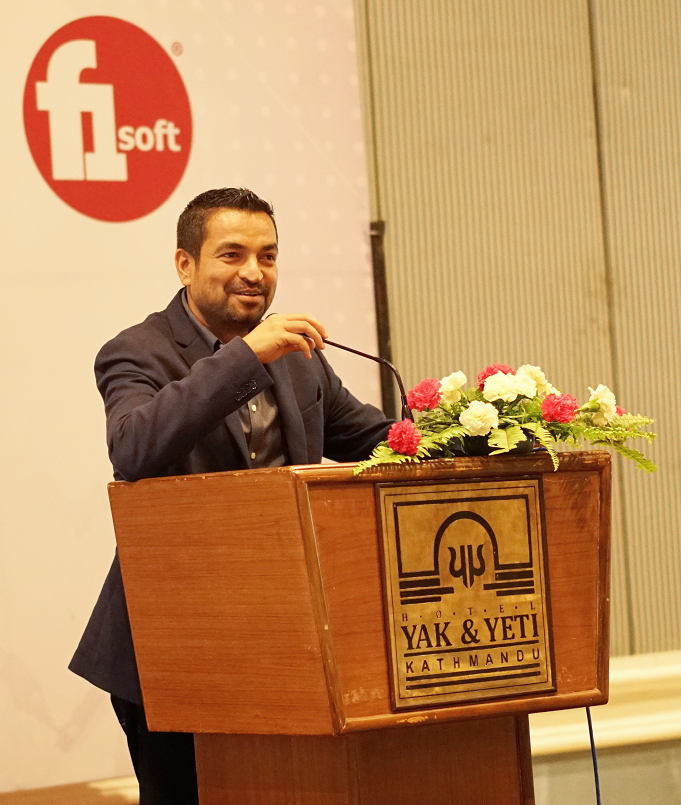
- Born: 14 December 1981 (age 44); Bharatpur, Mahottari
- Occupations: Entrepreneur; Innovator; Dynamic investor
- Years active: 2004-present
- Organization: F1Soft International
- Spouse: Isha Sharma
- Children: Bibhusa Dhakal (daughter)
- Awards: Entrepreneur ICT Award

Biswas Dhakal (Nepali: विश्वास ढकाल, born 14 December 1981) is a Nepali tech entrepreneur. He serves as the President of F1Soft International Pvt. Ltd, an ecosystem of digital products and services that facilitates Nepali consumers access to financial services. His journey begins in 2004 when he founded F1Soft. He founded eSewa a digital wallet company in 2009, CashOnAd, Logica Beans, Shiran Technologies Pvt. Ltd. Dhakal was selected by The US Department of State for the International Visitor Leadership Program (IVLP) and the Global Entrepreneurship Summit 2016 from Nepal.

== Business ==
Dhakal founded F1Soft International Pvt. Ltd. in 2004 while in his freshman year at Nepal College of Information Technology. F1Soft currently serves more than 90% of financial institutions in Nepal with FinTech products, and connects over 3 million people in Nepal to various financial services.

In 2009, Dhakal co-founded eSewa, Nepal's first mobile wallet. It carries out over 80% of digital payment in Nepal and process more than 130K transactions a day.

== Education ==
Dhakal attended Kantipur Engineering College, Tribhuvan University for Computer Engineering and Nepal College of Information Technology, Pokhara University for Software Engineering.

== Personal life ==
Dhakal was born in Bharatpur, Mahottari, Nepal. He lives with his wife, Isha Sharma and daughter Bibhusa Dhakal in Kathmandu, Nepal.
