= Jayant Rana =

Gorkhali general

Kaji Jayant Rana
- Native name: जयन्त राना
- Born: Jayant Rana Magar; Gorkha Kingdom (present day Gorkha, Nepal)
- Died: 1744 Belkot (present day Nuwakot District)
- Allegiance: Gorkha Kingdom; Kingdom of Kantipur
- Service years: c. 1736 – 1744
- Rank: Kaji
- Conflicts: Battle of Nuwakot (1736); Battle of Nuwakot (1743); Battle of Nuwakot (1744); Battle of Belkot (1744) †
- Spouse: Unknown
- Children: Sankhamani Rana

Kaji Jayant Rana Magar was a Gorkhali general of the Gorkha Kingdom, and the Kingdom of Kantipur who commanded one battle for Gorkha, and two battles for Kantipur against the invasion of Nuwakot. He died in 1744 after ordering to be skinned alive by Prithvi Narayan Shah, first King of Nepal.

== Biography ==
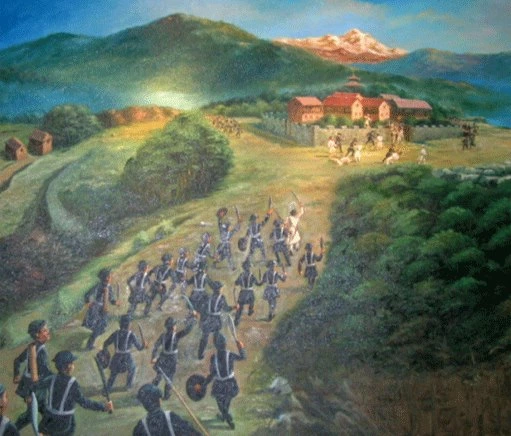
Gorkhali troops storming Nuwakot Fort during the Battle of Nuwakot (1744).

King of Gorkha, Nara Bhupal Shah, made Jayant Rana commander of his army with Maheshwar Panta. In 1736, the king sent both commanders to attack Nuwakot, territory controlled by the Kingdom of Kantipur but the attack was unsuccessful. They made a retreat back to Gorkha, however, both commanders blamed each other for the defeat. Fearing for his life, Rana quitted the army of Gorkha, subsequently joined the Kantipur army. King of Kantipur, Jaya Prakash Malla, appointed Rana to defend attacks from Gorkha as he had inside information on their strengths and weaknesses. Prithvi Narayan Shah ascended the throne of the Gorkha Kingdom in 1743 after the death of his father Nara Bhupal Shah. Like his father, he attacked Nuwakot, but he failed to win, thus he began to improve military technology and manpower.

When preparing for a war against Nuwakot, Prithvi Narayan Shah, wrote a letter to Jayant Rana to join Gorkha, mentioning his ex-relations, however, he declined to join his side, adding "I am yours, but I have already eaten the salt of Jaya Prakash Malla. Now I would die for him". Later, Jayant Rana Magar became aware of an oncoming attack from Gorkha and he assigned his son Sankhamani Rana to defend Nuwakot, then Jayant Rana went to Kantipur to get more soldiers. However, Kantipur was celebrating a major festival of Indra Jatra, thus he failed to get any additional soldiers to defend Nuwakot. Meanwhile, Prithvi Narayan Shah attacked Nuwakot, as soldiers were unprepared so they started to run away to Belkot. Rana's son, Sankhamani was killed in action. On 1 October 1744, Gorkha Kingdom won the war, subsequently, Jayant Rana was going back to Nuwakot but decided to stay at his second fort in Belkot for a counterattack, and started to prepare for another battle with Gorkha. Later Prithvi Narayan Shah attacked Belkot and won a nearly Pyrrhic victory, upon victory, Rana was captured. In 1744, Shah brought Rana to Nuwakot and ordered him to be skinned alive with the presence of people from Gorkha, and Nuwakot. Jayant Rana is remembered for being one of the "recorded act of violence" of Prithvi Narayan Shah.
