= Hindu kingship =

In Hinduism, kingship was a monarchy institution guided by the religious laws of Hinduism, with a corresponding complex and hierarchical structure. Hindu monarchies headed by Hindu kings were widespread in South Asia since about 1500 BC and later in Southeast Asia. Hindu monarchies went into slow decline in medieval times, with most gone by the end of the 17th century, although the last one, the Kingdom of Nepal, was abolished only in 2008. Modern countries with Hindu majority population, like India, Nepal and Mauritius, practice state secularism.

The notable Hindu empires in India included the Guptas (c. 320–550 AD), The Kushan Empire, the Chola Empire in Tamil Nadu (c. 848–1279 AD), and the Vijayanagara Empire (c. 1336–1646 AD). At different points in time, Hindu kingdoms and empires had dominated in Southeast Asia on the territories of the modern Indonesia, Malaysia, Philippines, Vietnam, Cambodia, Singapore, Timor Leste, Brunei and Thailand.

== Seven limbs ==
A Hindu kingdom was described as formed from seven "limbs":

1. the king himself (svāmī). The king typically represented the kshatria, a class of warrior aristocracy in the four varnas caste system. Hindu kingships usually did not have a priest-king, as the priestly duties were mostly performed by brahmins;
2. king's ministers (amātyas);
3. nation (janapada or rāṣṭra, included both the land and population);
4. army ("force", symbolically represented by daṇḍa, a sceptre);
5. forts (durga);
6. treasure (koṣa);
7. allies (mitra).

== King's divinity ==
The later Vedic era (c. 1000-600 BC) saw the introduction of religious ceremonies intended to affirm the Hindu king's supernatural powers: rajasuya, ashvamedha, vajapeya, aindrī-mahābhiṣeka, and punarābhiṣeka. The introduction of these expansive and expensive rituals was a probable cause of persistent tensions between the Hindu kings and Brahmins; as a result, the Hinduism views on the divinity of kings varied with time. The end of the Vedic era with its proliferation of alternative religions (śramaṇa) was characterized by rapidly diminishing attention to the deification of the kings. The Laws of Manu (1st to 3rd century AD) marked a revival of the kings' divinity; simultaneously, the Kushan Empire was worshipping also the deceased rulers. This upswing culminated in the Gupta Empire (3rd to 6th century AD).

== See also ==
- Mahajanapadas, 16 great ancient states in India

== Sources ==
- Chaulagain, Nawaraj (2019). "Kingship (Hinduism)". Hinduism and Tribal Religions. Encyclopedia of Indian Religions. Dordrecht: Springer Netherlands. pp. 1–7. doi:10.1007/978-94-024-1036-5_83-1. ISBN 978-94-024-1036-5.
- Sahai, S.B. (2010). The Hindu Civilisation: A Miracle of History. Gyan Publishing House. ISBN 978-81-212-1041-6.
- Basham, Arthur Llewellyn (1981). Ideas of Kingship in Hinduism and Buddhism. Kingship In Asia and early America: 30. International Congress of Human Sciences In Asia and North Africa. pp. 115–132.
- Scharfe, Hartmut (1989-01-01). "The King and his Court". The State in Indian Tradition. Brill. pp. 26–126. doi:10.1163/9789004491441_004. ISBN 978-90-04-49144-1.
