= Rishi Dhakal =

Nepalese, US-based businessman

- Occupation: Businessperson

Rishi Punnakhar Dhakal, is a Nepalese American businessman. He is CEO of Rising International Inc which is among the largest overseas importers of Nepali ready made garments. He is also honorary consul general of Nepal for San Diego California, US. He received the Commercially Important Person (CIP) title in Nepal from President of Nepal, Dr. Ram Baran Yadav. He is also vice-president of the Shree Pashupatinath Foundation, US.

== Early life and education ==
Rishi Dhakal was born in 1973 in Prithivi Narayan Municipality to Lila Nath Dhakal (father) and Megha Maya Dhakal. His siblings include Hari, Bhim, Thakur and Laxmi. Dhakal attended Ratnarajya Laxmi Secondary School and Shakti Secondary School before transferring to Mahendra Secondary School in Kundur, Gorkha where he completed his secondary education. After his secondary education, Dhakal studied in several institutions including Saraswoti Multiple Campus, Ratna Rajya Laxmi Campus, and Patan Multiple Campus before earning a bachelor’s degree in humanities at the Tribhuvan University.

== Career ==
Dhakal began his career in 1992 as an office clerk and rose through the ranks to the position of manager. After his civil service career, he went into business with diversified interests in fashion, hospitality industry, real estate and beauty industry. Dhakal is the president and CEO of Rising International Inc., headquartered in Irwindale, California, with several subsidiaries including Dhakal Brother LLC, Himalayan Investment LLC, Rising Star Trading Inc, kamana kitchen in Hawaii, Honomu Farm LLC in Hawaii, and Kamana Investment LLC in Hawaii. He is Honorary Consulate of Nepal to the US.

== Philanthropy ==
Dhakal philanthropic efforts focus on orphans and victims of war offering them education, health care and emotional supports. During the COVID-19 pandemic, Dhakal provided food, medical and financial aid to Nepalis in California and New York. Dhakal is a prominent member of Shree Pashupatinath Foundation, US.
