= Shobhakar Dhakal =

Vice President for Academic Affairs at the Asian Institute of Technology, Thailand

Shobhakar Dhakal (born in Nepal) is a Professor and former (April 2021 -August 23) Vice President for Academic Affairs at the Asian Institute of Technology, Thailand since April 2021. He also served as Dean of School of Environment, Resources and Development, and Head of Department of Energy Environment and Climate Change of Asian Institute of Technology. His main areas of expertise are in energy policy, climate change mitigation and policies, policy modelling and analysis, and cities and climate change. Dhakal actively contributes to international and scientific arena.

He is the Coordinating Lead Author of the Nobel Prize winning Inter-governmental Panel on Climate Change's 5th Assessment Report for the Chapter on Human Settlements, Infrastructure and Spatial Planning, and 6th Assessment Report for the Chapter on Emissions Trends and Drivers. He was also a member of the author group who develop a recent UNEP led global scientific assessment titled Making Peace with Nature, launched by UN Secretary General and UNEP Executive Director in February 2021, led by Bob Watson and Ivar Andreas Baste.

== Education ==
Dhakal received his Bachelors of Engineering (BEng) degree in electrical engineering from the National Institute of Technology, Surat in India, his Masters in Energy Economics and Policy from the Asian Institute of Technology, Bangkok and his PhD from The University of Tokyo. He was also a visiting student at the Massachusetts Institute of Technology (MIT) during his graduate studies.

== Academic work ==
He co-led the global assessment report on Climate change and cities. He served as a lead author of the Global Energy Assessment‘s for Urban Energy Systems and was the principal scientific reviewer of UNEP's Global Environmental Outlook (GEO-5). He was also a member of the Consensus Panel on Low Carbon Cities of the Academy of Sciences of South Africa (2008–2010) and member of the Cities Energy Modeling Group of the International Energy Agency for World Energy Outlook 2008. He was appointed to the Taskforce on Urban Development and Energy Efficiency of the China Council for International Cooperation on Environment and Development in the past.

Together with Skee Houghton, Dhakal was founder and senior editor of the Carbon Management Journal published by Future Sciences in 2009 which has now been taken over by Taylor and Francis group. He was the co-editor of Carbon Management Journal until December 2016. He has served in editorial boards of several scholarly journal in various capacity such as Sustainable Cities and Society, Sustainability (MDPI), Urban Climate, Journal of Industrial Ecology, Energy Policy and others.

He is involved in city-based carbon mitigation research and was an executive director of the Global Carbon Project from 2006 to 2012 and played an instrumental role in bridging science and government policy. He was a guest scholar to the International Institute for Applied Systems Analysis, a visiting associate professor to Nagoya University, and a visiting researcher to National Institute for Environmental Studies, Japan, among others. He was also a senior policy researcher and project manager of urban program at the Institute for Global Environment Strategies Japan doe 2000–2006.
