= Kulananda Dhakal =

Nepalese astrologer

Kulananda Dhakal was the most famous priest and astrologer of Prithvi Narayan Shah who united Nepal from Borlang Gorkha. Allegedly following his advice, the King could win the battles after he lost so many times. According to the legend, Kulananda Dhakal performed a religious ritual of shakti anusthan, charged the weapons to be used in the warfare with mantras, and calculated the exact time at which to start the battle.

He is considered a common ancestor by all the Dhakals. Ek Nath Dhakal, former Minister for Co-operatives and Poverty Alleviation and Minister for Peace and Reconstruction, Government of Nepal, who was born in Borlang, Gorkha is a great-grandson of Kulananda Dhakal.

The advisors of Prithvinarayan like Harivamsa Upadhyaya and the astrologer Kulananda Dhakal counseled before war.
