= Mahoddam Kirti Shah =

- Prince of Gorkha
- Born: Gorkha Kingdom
- Died: Nepal
- Issue: Balbhadra Shah; Srikrishna Shah
- Nepali: महोद्दमकीर्ति शाह
- Dynasty: Shah dynasty
- Father: Nara Bhupal Shah
- Religion: Hinduism

Mahoddam Kirti Shah (Nepali: महोद्दमकीर्ति शाह) was a Prince of the Gorkha Kingdom. He was active during the Unification of Nepal military campaign led by his brother, King Prithvi Narayan Shah.

He also held the rank of Chautaria. In 1744, he commanded the Battle of Nuwakot with Kalu Pande, and Prithvi Narayan Shah.

His two sons Balbhadra Shah, and Srikrishna Shah also held the rank of the Chautaria.
