= Hariharpur Gadhi (fort) =

Fort in Nepal

- हरिहरपुरगढी
- Sindhuli, Bagmati Province in Nepal
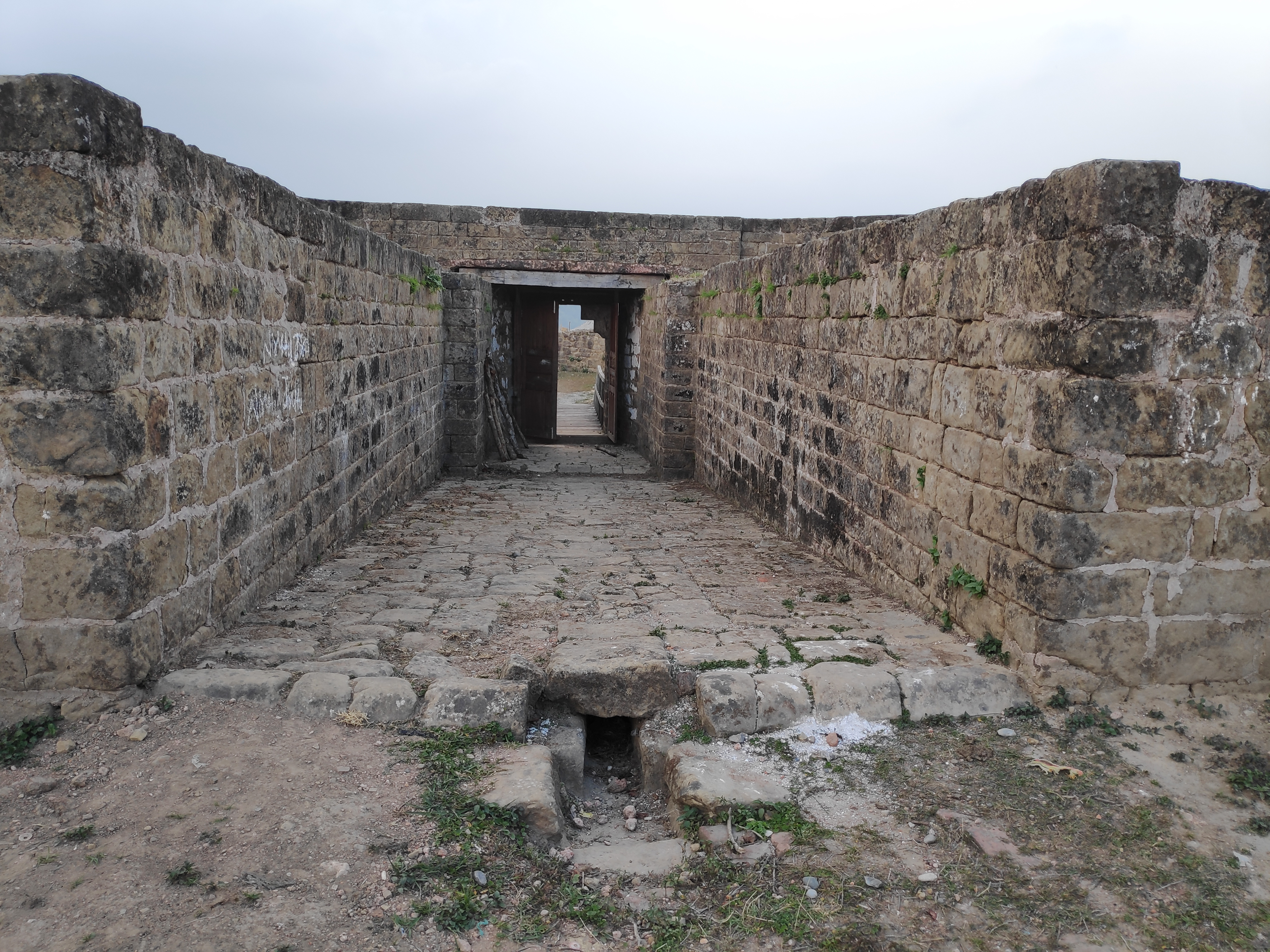
- Gate of Hariharpur Gadhi in 2019

Site information
- Type: Fort

Location
- Location of Hariharpur Gadhi in Nepal Hariharpur Gadhi (Nepal)
- Coordinates: 27.316416900840906°N 85.48297364761206°E

Hariharpur Gadhi (Nepali: हरिहरपुरगढी) is a fort in Sindhuli District, Bagmati Province.

It was used during the Unification of Nepal, and the Anglo-Nepalese War (1814–1816).

In 2019, the Hariharpurgadhi Conservation Committee started to renovate the fort.
