= Bharatpur, Mahottari =

Coordinates: 26°55′N 85°46′E

Bharatpur, Mahottari भरतपुर
- Village development committee
- Interactive map of Bharatpur, Mahottari
- Country: Nepal
- Zone: Janakpur Zone
- District: Mahottari District

Population (2068)
  - Total: 6,410
- Time zone: UTC+5:45 (Nepal Time)

Bharatpur, Mahottari is a village development committee in Mahottari District in the Janakpur Zone of south-eastern Nepal. At the time of the 1991 Nepal census it had a population of 6410 people living in 1131 individual households.
