= Maheshwar Panta =

Nepalese Army chief (18th century)

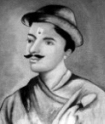
Maheshwar Panta

Maheshwar Panta or Manohar Pant (Nepali: महेश्वर पन्त) was the teacher and later Army Chief of Gorkha King Prithvi Narayan Shah (1723–1775 AD). With Bhanu Aryal, he trained King Prithvi Narayan. When Biraj Thapa Magar failed to attack Nuwakot, he with Kalu Pandey was sent to attack Nuwakot. Both Panta and Pandey failed respectively, and Prithvi Narayan Shah began training.
