= Greater Nepal =

Nepalese irredentist concept

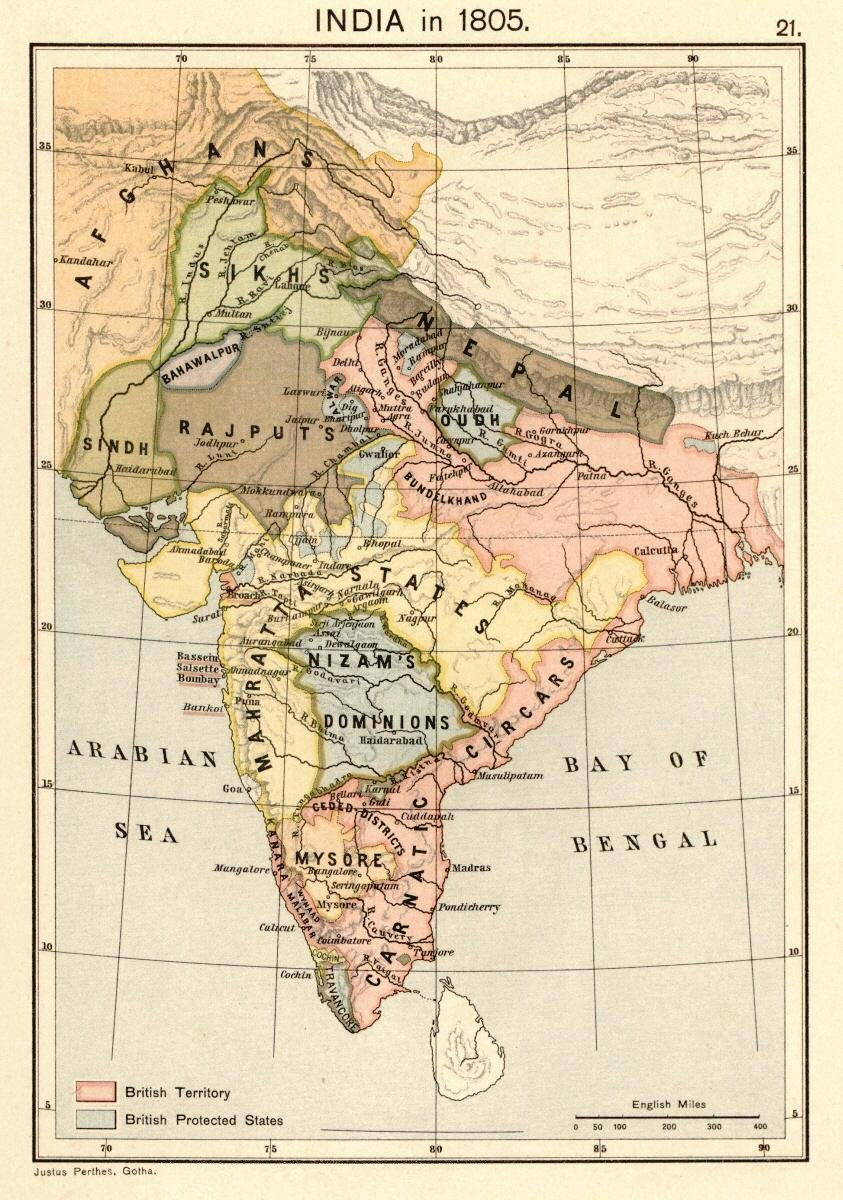
Nepal in 1805 is the predominant idea of "Greater Nepal"

Greater Nepal is an irredentist concept in Nepal, which claims current Indian and Bangladeshi territories beyond Nepal's present-day boundaries. These claims typically include the areas controlled by Nepal between 1791 and 1816, a period that ended with the Anglo-Nepalese War and the signing of Sugauli Treaty. In addition, extensive territories in the present-day Indian states of Uttarakhand, Himachal Pradesh, Uttar Pradesh, Bihar, West Bengal and some parts of Bangladesh are also included in the claims of the activist organisation Greater Nepal Nationalist Front, which demands the "return" of these territories to Nepal. A map similar to theirs was displayed by the prime minister of Nepal in his office in June 2023, during his tenure as mayor of Kathmandu, in reaction to an alleged "Akhand Bharat" map in the Indian Parliament building.

== Background ==
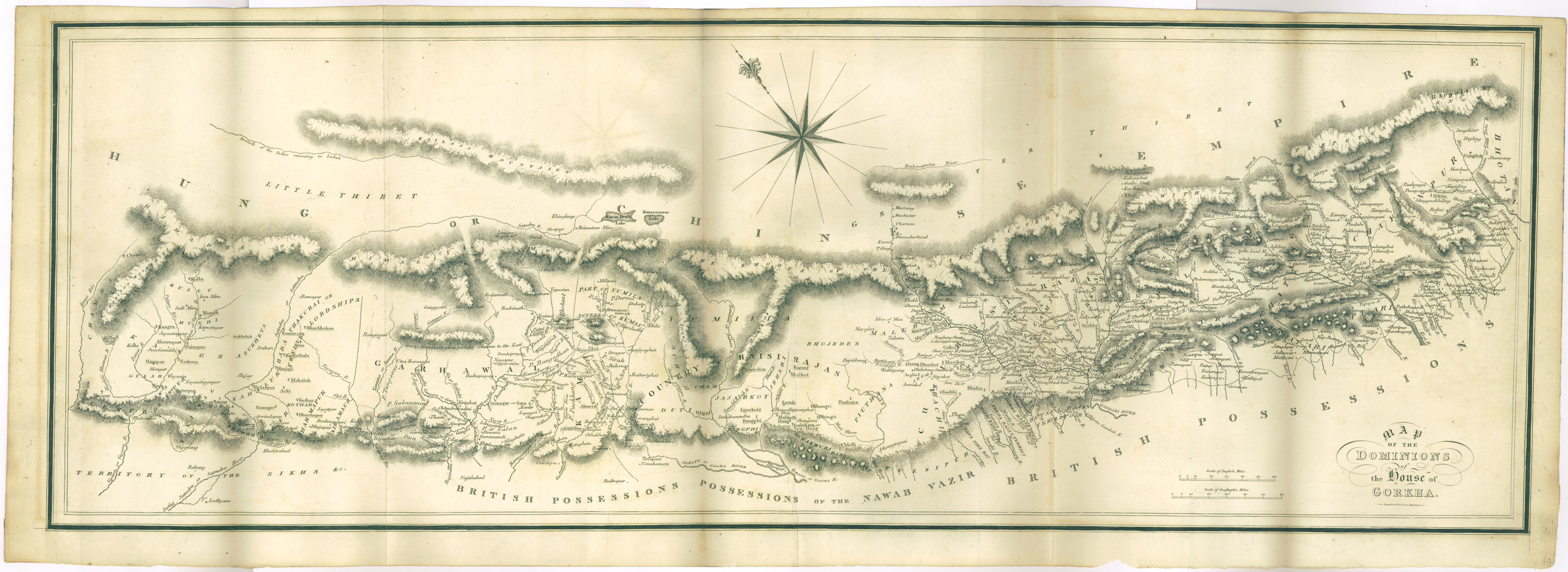
Greater Nepal map with ceded territory

Nepal was originally the name of the Kathmandu valley, and, in this sense, the term had been in existence for 2000 years. In the 18th century, the king of the Gorkha Kingdom, Prithvi Narayan Shah, started a process of expansion, conquering Kathmandu in 1768 and making it his new capital. The expanded state continued to be called "Gorkha" or "Gorkhali" until the early 20th century, with the term "Nepal" being officially adopted as the name much later in the 1930s.

After the death of Prithvi Narayan Shah, the Gorkha state continued to expand, conquering the Gandaki and Karnali basins, and then Kumaon and Garhwal (1792), halting at the Sutlej River where the Sikh Empire exerted its influence (1809–10). In the east, the Gorkhas occupied the western half of Sikkim up to the Teesta River. (Note: The occupation was in violation of the prevailing boundary treaty at that time, but it might have been justified by the allegation that Tibet was opening an alternative trade route to India via the Chumbi Valley and Sikkim.)

Even though all of this was a straightforward military conquest with no national feelings of any kind, the modern Nepalese narrative retroactively treats it as the "unification" of a Nepalese "nation". Some of these extended conquests came unstuck in 1815, when during the Anglo-Nepalese War, the British General Ochterloney compelled the Gorkhali commander Amar Singh Thapa to withdraw from Garhwal and Kumaon across the Sharda River (or Mahakali River). Negotiations for a general settlement took place at Sugauli in Bihar and agreed in December 1815, but ratified only after Ochterlony advanced to Makwanpur, thirty miles short of Kathmandu. Among the terms of the Treaty of Sugauli was also the Nepalese withdrawal from the territory of Sikkim east of the Mechi river, which was a British ally in the war.

The Gorkha rule over this "historical Greater Nepal" from Sutlej to Teesta was brief. The duration of Gorkhali presence in Garhwal was 12 years, Kumaon 24 years, and Sikkim 33 years. It has been claimed that the Treaty of Sugauli caused Nepal's rulers to lose about 176,000 km^{2} of territory and left the country with only 147,516 km^{2} total area.

== Advocacy ==
=== Greater Nepal Committee ===
A Greater Nepal Committee was formed in Kathmandu in 1991, which wrote letters to the embassies of different countries claiming that India should "unconditionally return to Nepal", territories "east of Mechi river and west of Mahakali", which were ceded to the British in the Treaty of Sugauli. The committee claimed to create a "world-wide public opinion" in favour of 'Greater Nepal'.

The letter was signed by Surendra Dhakal, the former editor of Kathmandu weekly, Rangamanch. Dhakal claimed that the Nepali leaders were cowed down by fear of India and that it was the moral and nationalistic duty of the people to raise such demands.

=== Greater Nepal Nationalist Front ===
The Greater Nepal Nationalist Front (GNNF, formerly "Unified Nepal National Front") is a Nepalese NGO headed by Phanindra Nepal, which champions the cause of Greater Nepal. The organisation disowns the 1810 Sugauli Treaty and the 1950 Treaty of Peace and Friendship with India. It demands the return of the land that belonged to Nepal before the signing of the Sugauli Treaty. This involves land up to the Sutlej River in the west, the Teesta River in the east ("Shimla to Darjeeling" in the organisation's parlance) and extending up to Varanasi in the south.

Scholars Mishra and Haque state that the organisation is rhetorically very powerful. The map of Greater Nepal produced by the organisation provides power to the movement by building "meanings and nostalgic longings". The movement has a web page in the Nepali language, a Facebook page and blog sites.

An even more grandiose movement is said to talk about "Unified Gorkha-States of India Sub-Continent", which restructures the Indian subcontinent into five autonomous states, the largest of which is the so-called "Arya Autonomous State".

=== Nepalese Maoists ===
A Maoist movement has published a 260-page Nepali book titled "Nepal: Teesta Dekhi Satlej Samma" ("Nepal: From Teesta to the Sutlej") which, while repeating similar demands to the GNNF, also provides copious references to alleged historical facts. Among others, it claims that the Indian prime minister Jawaharlal Nehru supported the idea of "Greater Nepal". Their map includes the Indian towns of Varanasi, Ballia, Bahraich, Pilibhit and Jaunpur within Greater Nepal. The Maoist leader Prachanda dismissed the claims in an interview with the Times of India as a "media-created stunt". But according to the Times of India the book was readily available in and around the Maoist camps along the Indo-Nepal border in 2005. The Maoist-affiliated Indian Nepali advocacy group Akhil Bharat Nepali Ekta Samaj is also supportive of the Greater Nepal ideal according to some sources.

=== Nepalese scholars ===
Scholars and retired officials such as Buddhi Narayan Shrestha (former Director of the Survey Department) and Dwarika Nath Dhungel (former secretary of Water Resources) have published scholarly articles with maps labelled "Greater Nepal". Shrestha has also spoken in Greater Nepal gatherings and made media comments in its favour, declaring "The land we lost to the East India Company should not belong to India. It is ours."

Shreshta narrates that, before the Sugauli Treaty, Nepal extended up to the confluence of Gandak and Ganges Rivers in the south, and to Shigatse and Tashilhunpo in the north. "It was called the 'Greater Nepal'", he states, without mentioning who called it so. British India apparently "did not like" Greater Nepal as a unified country and therefore dismembered it. He alleges that the British wanted to expand trade into Tibet but, since Nepal stood in the way, they needed to cut it down.

== Official positions ==
No king of Nepal has ever discussed or approved of the concept of "Greater Nepal". However, upon forming a coalition government after the 2008 Nepalese Constituent Assembly election, the leader of the Communist Party of Nepal (Maoist) and then-prime minister Pushpa Kamal Dahal (popularly known as "Prachanda") stated that the 1950 Indo-Nepal Treaty of Peace and Friendship would be "scrapped". However, the matter was pursued no further. He resigned nine months later for other reasons. Late Nepali Prime Minister Girija Prasad Koirala called the idea of Greater Nepal "a product of unstable minds". According to Kanak Mani Dixit, as of 1993, the mainstream Left of Nepal appears ambivalent: "They like the concept but are unwilling to do anything about it."

In 2023 when the Mauryan Empire mural in India's new Parliament building appeared in the newspapers, some politicians of the ruling Bharatiya Janata Party started branding it an Akhand Bharat map. The fact that included some Nepalese towns such as Lumbini produced consternation in Nepal. The mayor of Kathmandu, Balen Shah placed a map of Greater Nepal in his office as a protest.

== See also ==
- Unification of Nepal
- Politics in Nepal

== Bibliography ==
- Mishra, Ratneshwar (2007), "Ethnicity and National Unification: The Madheshis of Nepal (Sectional President's Address)", Proceedings of the Indian History Congress, 67: 802–833, JSTOR 44148000
- Pradhan, Kumar (1991), The Gorkha Conquests of Eastern Nepal and Sikkim, Calcutta: Oxford University Press – via dspace.cus.ac.in
- Rose, Leo E. (1971), Nepal – Strategy for Survival, University of California Press, ISBN 978-0-520-01643-9
- Shrestha, Buddhi N. (2013), "Demarcation of the International Boundaries of Nepal" (PDF), in Haim Srebro (ed.), International Boundary Making, Copenhagen: International Federation of Surveyors, pp. 149–182, ISBN 978-87-92853-08-0
- Whelpton, John (1997), "Political Identity in Nepal: State, Nation and Community", in David N. Gellner; Joanna Pfaff-Czarnecka; John Whelpton (eds.), Nationalism and Ethnicity in a Hindu Kingdom: The Politics of Culture in Contemporary Nepal, Routledge, pp. 39–78, ISBN 978-90-5702-089-6
- Whelpton, John (2005), A History of Nepal, Cambridge University Press, ISBN 978-0-521-80470-7
