= Junge pillars =

Junge khambas

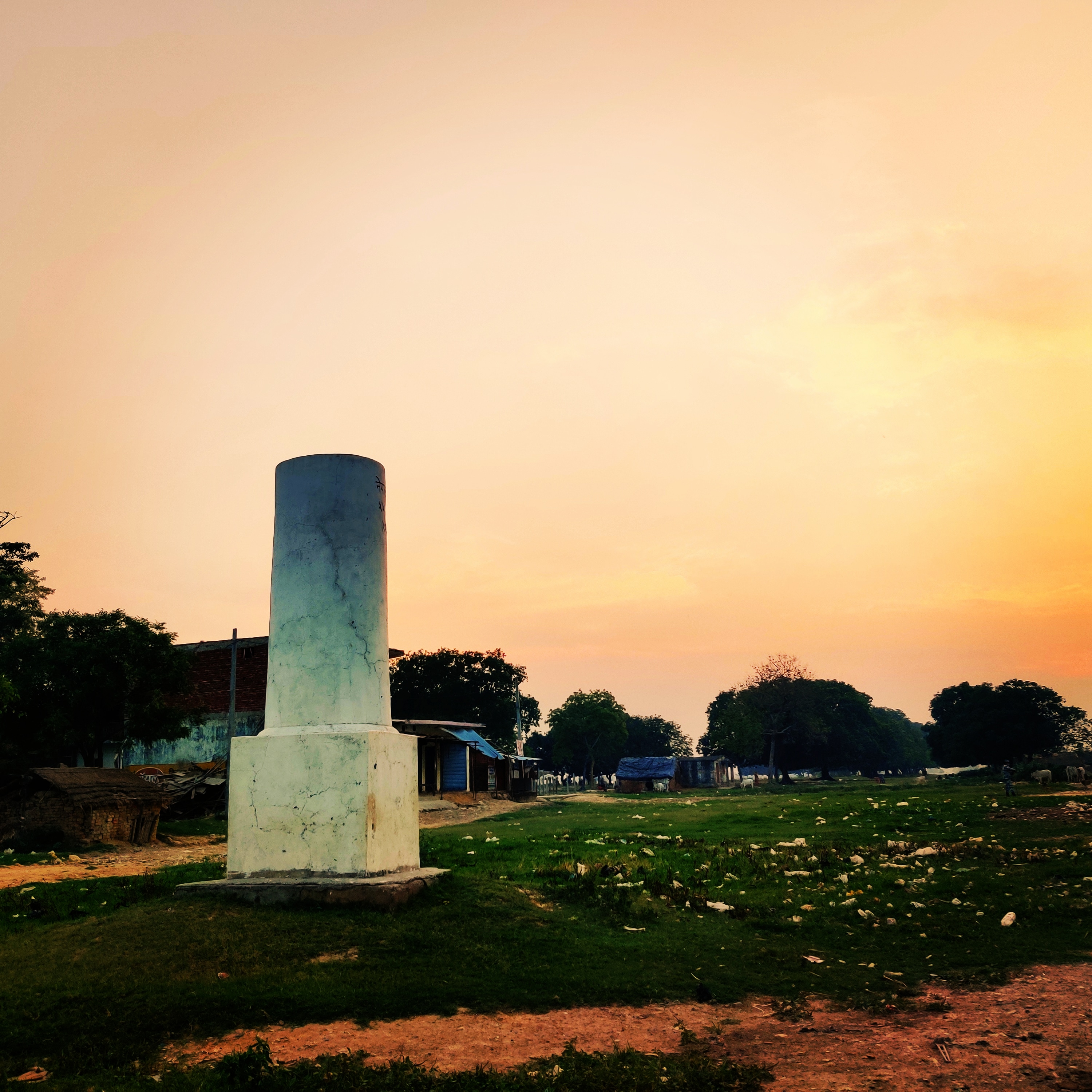
View of a surviving Junge pillar.

Junge pillars (Devanagari: जंगे पिलर) also known as Junge khambas are categorised as reference pillars but not as main boundary pillars along the India-Nepal border. These pillars were built after the historical Sugauli Treaty. These pillars are tall and thick compared to the main boundary pillars. Presently, a very few Junge pillars have been survived.

Apart from the Indo-Nepal Border, the Junge pillars were also erected along the Nepal-China border.
