= Nepal–Britain Treaty of 1923 =

Treaty in which Britain recognized Nepal

Nepal-Britain Treaty of 1923
- Signed: 21 December 1923 (Paush 6, 1980 B.S.)
- Location: Singha Durbar, Kathmandu, Nepal
- Effective: 21 December 1923
- Condition: Recognition of Nepal as an independent and sovereign state by Great Britain.
- Expiration: 31 July 1950 (Note: The 1923 treaty was superseded by the 1950 treaty between India and Nepal. (See: 1950 Indo-Nepal Treaty of Peace and Friendship))
- Signatories: Nepal British Empire
- Languages: Nepali, English

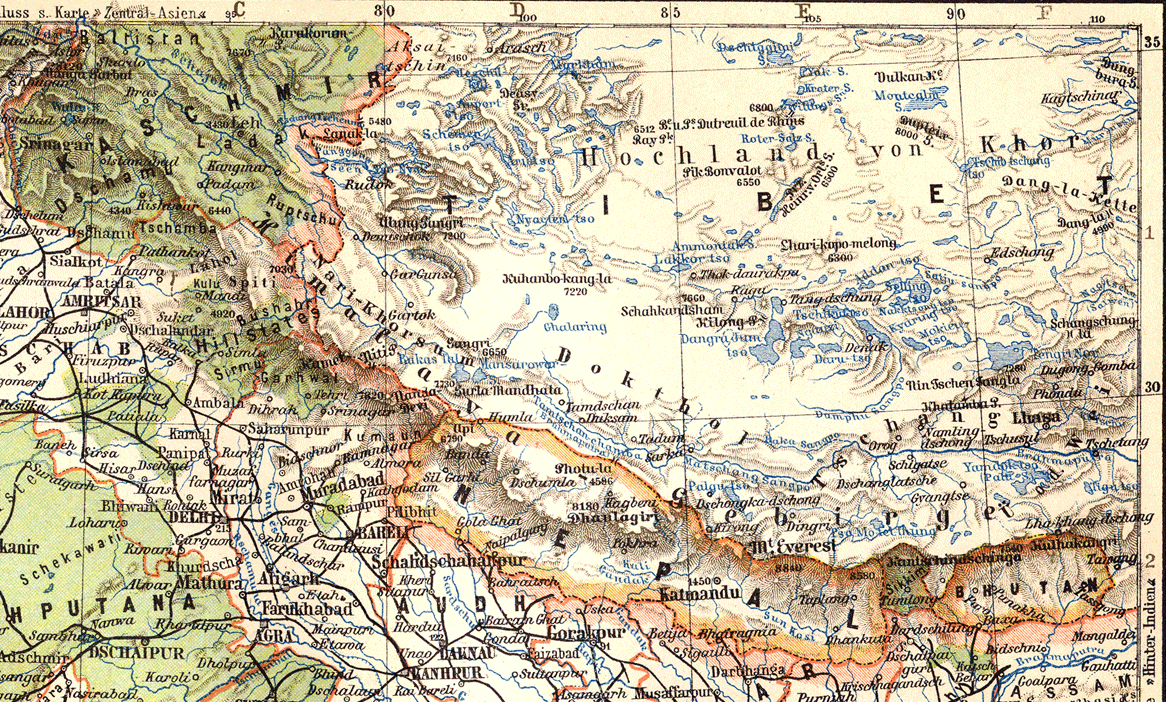
Map of Nepal, 1905

The Nepal–Britain Treaty was first discussed in 1921 and the final treaty was signed on 21 December 1923 in Singha Durbar. The 1923 Treaty of Friendship between Nepal and Great Britain formally affirmed the independent status of both countries. Article 1 stated that “the two Governments agree mutually to acknowledge and respect each other's independence, both internal and external.” Although the treaty is often described as Britain’s reaffirmation of Nepalese independence, its wording was explicitly reciprocal, with both governments acknowledging and respecting each other’s internal and external independence.The treaty was recorded in 1925 in the League of Nations.

== Background ==
=== Expansion of Gorkha Kingdom (Nepal) ===
While the territory of Nepal has been united and fragmented multiple times during the reign of various rulers throughout history, the Expansion of Kingdom, campaign of present-day Nepal was initiated by Prithivi Narayan Shah, who succeeded to the throne of Gorkha after the death of his father Nara Bhupal Shah in 1743 (1799 BS). Nepal, at the time, was divided into more than 50 small principalities. Prithivi Narayan Shah and his successors (Note: The ones mostly accredited for the reunification of Nepal are Prithivi Narayan Shah, his son Bahadur Shah, and Prime Minister Bhimsen Thapa.) expanded the territory of the small state of Gorkha into a large kingdom. At its peak, during the time of Prime Minister Bhimsen Thapa, in 1810, the territory of Nepal extended from Sutlej River in the west to Tista River in the east. (Note: The east-west average length of Nepali is believed to have been about 700 miles in 1810.) However, the country of Nepal and its existence was still a mystery in many of the European countries.

=== Sugauli Treaty ===
The Treaty of Sagauli (1816) marked the end of the Anglo-Nepalese War (1814–1816) and allowed British India to cede parts of Nepal's land. The Sugauli Treaty had rendered moot the degree of independence of Nepal. The sixth, seventh and eighth points of the treaty were:

6) The king of Nepal engages never to molest or disturb the king of Sikkim in the possession of his territories. If any difference shall arise between Nepal and Sikkim, it shall be referred to the arbitration of the East India Company.

7) The king of Nepal hereby engages never to take or retain in his service any British subject, nor the subject of any European or American State, without the consent of the British Government.

8) In order to secure and improve the relations of amity and peace hereby established between Nepal and Britain (East India Company), it is agreed that accredited Ministers from each shall reside at the court of the other.

== Nepalese-British relations before the treaty of 1923 ==
After the Anglo-Nepalese War of 1814–1816, Nepal had generally maintained a peaceful stance with the East India Company. The friendship between the two countries reached its pinnacle during the reign of Jang Bahadur Rana. During the Sepoy Mutiny of 1857, Nepal also involved itself in support of the East India Company. After the Sepoy Mutiny, some areas of the Terai region that comprise today's Banke, Bardiya, Kailali, and Kanchanpur districts of Western Terai, collectively known as "Naya Muluk" ("New Country") were returned to Nepal. (Note: Banke, Bardiya, Kanchanpur and Kailali, also known as "New Kingdom" were given to Jung Bahadur in 1860, 1 November.) Nepal also helped the British in the First World War. The relationship between Nepal and Britain was generally good both before and after the treaty.

== Treaty discussions ==
The then Prime Minister of Nepal, Chandra Shamsher wanted to conclude a treaty with Britain for the recognition of the independence of Nepal. Aware of the implied restrictions placed upon the foreign policy of Nepal by the Sugauli Treaty, he wanted Nepal to be recognized as a fully sovereign state. In 1921, when the Prince of Wales, later Edward VIII, came to Kathmandu, Chandra Shumsher raised the question of formulating a new peace treaty between Nepal and Britain. The treaty was discussed by the British authorities in Kathmandu, Nepal and London for more than a year before the final treaty was signed, on 21 December 1923, in Singha Durbar, Kathmandu.

== Terms of the Treaty ==
The terms of the 1923 Nepal Britain Treaty were:

1) Nepal and Britain will forever maintain peace and mutual friendship and respect each other's internal and external independence.

2) All previous treaties, agreements and engagements, since and including the Sugauli Treaty of 1815, which have been concluded between the two Government are hereby cancelled, except so far as they may be altered by the present Treaty.

3) As the preservation of peace and friendly relations with the neighbouring States whose territories adjoin their common frontiers is to the mutual interests of both the High Contracting Parties, they hereby agree to inform each other of any rupture such friendly relations, and each to exert its good offices as far as may be possible to remove such friction and misunderstanding.

4) Each of the High Contracting Parties will use all such measure as it may deem practicable to prevent its territories being used for purpose inimical to the security of the other.

5) In view of the longstanding friendship that has subsisted between the British Government and the Government of Nepal and for the sake of cordial neighbourly relations between them, the British Government agrees that the Nepal Government shall be free to import from or through British India into Nepal whatever arms, ammunition, machinery, warlike material or stores may be required or desired for the strength and welfare of Nepal, and that this arrangement shall hold good for all times as long as the British Government is satisfied that the intentions of the Nepal Government are friendly and that there is no immediate danger to India from such importations. The Nepal such arms, ammunition, etc., across the frontier of Nepal either by the Nepal Government or by private individuals. If, however, any convention for the regulation of the Arms Traffic, to which the British Government may be a party, shall come into force, the right of importation of arms and ammunition by the Nepal Government shall be subject to the proviso that the Nepal Government shall first become a party to that Convention, and that such importation shall only be made in accordance with the provisions of that Convention.

6) No Customs duty shall be levied at British Indian ports on goods imported on behalf of the Nepal Government of immediate transport to that country provided that a certificate from such authority as may from time to time be determined by the two governments shall be presented at the time of importation to the Chief Customs Officer at the port of import setting forth that the goods are the property of the Nepal Government, are required for the public services of the Nepal Government are not for the purpose of any State monopoly or State trade, and are being to Nepal under orders of the Nepal Government, The British Government also agrees to the grant in respect of all trade goods, imported at British Indian ports for immediate transmission to Kathmandu without breaking bulk en route, of a rebate of the full duty paid, provided that in accordance with arrangements already agreed to, between the two Governments, such goods may break bulk for repacking at the port of entry under Customs supervision in accordance with such rules as may from time to time be laid down in this behalf. The rebate may be claimed on the authority of a certificate signed by the said authority that the goods have arrive at Kathmandu with Customs seals unbroken and otherwise untampered with.

7) This Treaty signed in the part of the British Government by Lieutenant-Colonel W.F.T. O'Connor, C.I.E., C.V.O., British Envoy at the Court of Nepal and on the part of Nepal Government by General His Highness Maharaja Sir Chandra Shumsher Junga Bahadur Rana, G.C.B, G.C.S.I., G.D.M.G., G.C.V.O., D.C.I., Thong-lin Pimma Kokang- Wang-Syan, Prime Minister and Marshal of Nepal, shall be ratified and the ratification shall be exchanged at the Kathmandu as soon as practicable.

== Effects of the treaty ==
This was the first treaty between Nepal and Britain to be recorded in the League of Nations. The treaty made clear the international status of Nepal. The treaty declared Nepal as an independent and sovereign state. The treaty was also the first treaty between Nepal and Britain which was concluded with the mutual discussion between both nations. According to Nepalese historians, the main achievement of the treaty was the protection of the independence of Nepal and the increment of the status of Nepal among the other nations of the world. Most Nepalese historians agree that the treaty was the major achievement of the Rana rule. The British representative residing in Nepal, previously known as Resident was from then titled as Envoy.

The 1923 treaty between Britain and Nepal, which formally recognised Nepal’s complete independence, served in part as a reward for its wartime cooperation. The British may also have been motivated by a desire to ensure the continued loyalty of Gurkha troops deployed to suppress unrest in India. By establishing Nepal as fully separate from India, the authorities hoped these soldiers would be less inclined to identify with Indian nationalist aspirations. Even prior to 1923, the Nepalese authorities had consistently maintained that their country was wholly independent, a position that Britain itself had earlier fully accepted. By the late nineteenth century, however, British Indian officials had begun to contend that Nepal occupied an intermediate status between that of fully independent Afghanistan and the princely or native states within India that were subject to the British Crown.

== See also ==
- Sugauli Treaty
- Nepal–Britain Treaty of 1860
- 1950 Indo-Nepal Treaty of Peace and Friendship
- Chandra Shamsher Jang Bahadur Rana
- Anglo-Nepalese War
