= Buddhi Narayan Shrestha =

Nepalese geographer

- Born: 1 May 1941 (age 85); Okhaldhunga, Nepal
- Education: Tribhuvan University
- Occupations: Surveyor, geographer
- Employer(s): Land Survey Department of Nepal; Bhumichitra Mapping Company
- Known for: Border issues of Nepal
- Notable work: Boundary of Nepal
- Website: bordernepal.com

Buddhi Narayan Shrestha (born 1 May 1941) is a Nepalese geographer and surveyor specialising in the border issues of Nepal. He served as the director general of the Survey Department of Nepal, retiring in 1992, and is a prominent advocate of the Greater Nepal concept. His book Boundary of Nepal won the Madan Puraskar prize in 2000. He is currently the managing director of Bhumichitra Mapping Company.

== Life and career ==
Shrestha received a master's degree in geography with land surveying from the Tribhuvan University in 1964. After receiving training in land surveying at the West Bengal Survey Institute in Calcutta, he carried out Ph.D. research at the Tribhuvan University. His research area was dealing with border issues of Nepal with "special reference to the demarcation of Mechi and Mahakali riverine segments" and their implications for the border management system of Nepal.

Shrestha worked in the Land Survey Department of Nepal for 27 years, in positions ranging from survey officer to director general, retiring in 1992. Afterwards, he became a consultant and later the managing director for the Bhumichitra Mapping Company.

Shrestha served on the Nepal–India and Nepal–China Joint boundary Committees. He serves on the Board of Nepal's Institute of Foreign Affairs, as a nominee of the Nepal Government. He is the President of Nepal Institution of Chartered Surveyors.

== Greater Nepal advocacy ==
Following his retirement in 1992, Shrestha became a leading intellectual figure in the Greater Nepal movement, an irredentist concept that claims territories lost by Nepal to the British East India Company under the Treaty of Sugauli (1816) should be returned to Nepal.

Shrestha has been a public advocate of the Greater Nepal concept. In a 2008 interview with The Kathmandu Post, he stated: "We could regain Greater Nepal," and has declared that "the land we lost to the East India Company should not belong to India. It is ours."

Shrestha's cartographic work has been influential in Nepali nationalist discourse. He is credited with creating Nepal's political map published in his 2003 book Border Management of Nepal. His key territorial argument regarding the western border is that the Mahakali River originates at Limpiyadhura, and that the territory of Limpiyadhura-Kalapani-Lipulekh — approximately 372 square kilometres — belongs to Nepal.

=== Criticism ===
Shrestha's position on the Kalapani-Limpiyadhura claim has been challenged by historians on both sides of the border. The historian Sam Cowan, writing in 2020, noted that the Nepali governor Bam Shah had made the same claim in 1817 — that the western branch of the headwaters should be considered the main stream of the Kali — and that it was firmly rejected by the British Governor-General Lord Moira. Cowan wrote that it was "difficult to give credence to an appeal against such a trenchant ruling after 200 years of silence."

The broader Greater Nepal concept has been described as irredentist by scholars and commentators. The Greater Nepal Committee was formed in Kathmandu in July 1991, shortly after the restoration of democracy in Nepal. Political scientist Anirudha Gupta of Jawaharlal Nehru University characterised the movement as part of a pattern of "historical revivalism" that "always brings up irredentist eruptions."

== Works ==
Shrestha has authored fifteen books on border demarcation and management of Nepal, which include: 1. About Myself, 2023. 2. Collection of Historical Boundary Maps Related to Nepal, 2022. 3. Border Man of Nepal (2021) published from Generis Publishing- Moldova, Europe and Kathmandu, Nepal, 2021. 4. International Boundaries of Nepal (2019) published from Lambert Academic Publishing, Latvia, Europe; and South Asian Edition from Nirala Publications, New Delhi, India, 2021. 5. Collection of Historical Boundary maps Related to Nepal, (in Devanagari Script Version), 2020. 6. Counting of Border Pillars (in Devanagari Script) 2019. 7. Junge-Buddhe (in Devanagari Script), 2017. 8. Knowledge on Earthquake (in Devanagari Script), 2017. 9. Border War (in Devanagari Script), 2013. 10. Indo-Nepal Frontier Dams (in Devanagari Script), 2010. 11. Knowledge on Boundaries (in Devanagari Script), 2008. 12. Border Management of Nepal, 2003. 13. Border Management in the context of National Security (in Devanagari Script), 2002. 14. Boundary of Nepal (in Devanagari Script), 2000. 15. Cadastral Surveying for Public Usefulness (in Devanagari Script), 1982. • The book ‘International Boundaries of Nepal’ has been translated into eight languages (Russian, French, German, Dutch, Italian, Spanish, Portuguese and Polish) by the same publisher- Lambert Academic Publishing- Latvia, Europe. Boundary of Nepal won the prestigious Madan Puraskar prize of Nepal in 2000.

           * 533 articles have been published in various daily, weekly newspapers. The latest ten
           articles have been mentioned below. The rest are mentioned in my book 'Junge Buddhe'
           Second Edition-2020 AD, page 364-66 and others.

- Given 641 electronic media interviews in television and radio FM. These are mentioned in my book 'Junge-Buddhe' Second Edition-2020, page 371 to 386 and some others. Ten of them have been mentioned below. Besides, Online Media have transmitted my interviews more than 50 items.
