= Nepal–Britain Treaty of 1860 =

Border re-adjusting treaty between East India Company and Nepal

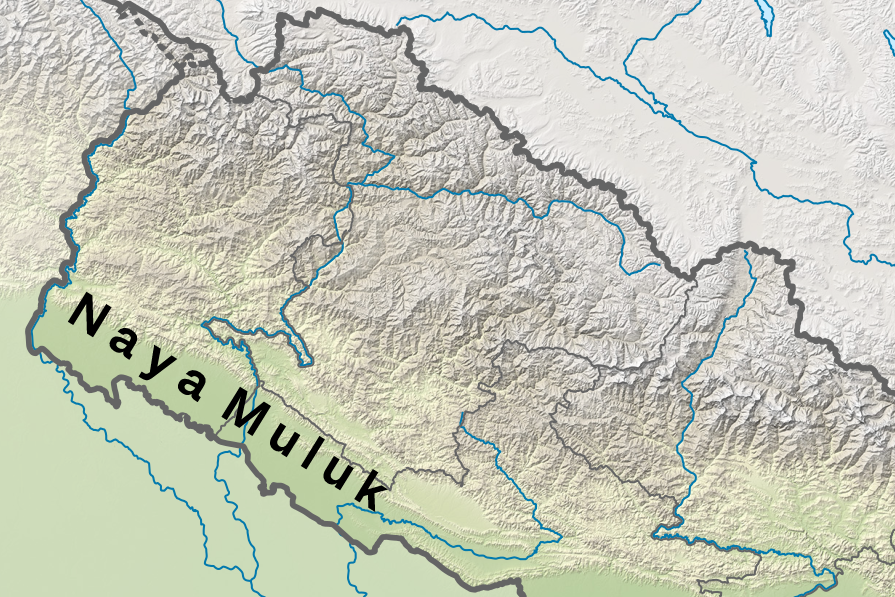
- Lands returned by the treaty
- Context: To return the Naya Muluk
- Signed: 1 November 1860
- Ratified: 15 November 1860
- Signatories: Nepal British Empire
- Languages: Nepali, English

The Nepal–Britain Treaty was signed on 1 November 1860 in Kathmandu by Jung Bahadur Rana on behalf of King Surendra Bikram Shah and by George Ramsay on the part of Charles Canning, 1st Earl Canning, Governor-General of India. The treaty was ratified on 15 November 1860 in Calcutta.

The treaty restored the Terai lands ceded by the Treaty of Sugauli, which included the districts of Kanchanpur, Kailali, Bardiya, and Banke.

== Terms of the Treaty ==
The terms of the 1860 Nepal Britain Treaty were:

During the disturbances which followed the mutiny of the Native army of Bengal in 1857, the Maharajah of Nipal not only faithfully maintained the relations of peace and friendship established between the British Government and the State of Nipal by the Treaty of Segowlee, but freely placed troops at the disposal of the British authorities for the preservation of order in the Frontier Districts, and subsequently sent a force to co-operate with the British Army in the recapture of Lucknow and the final defeat of the rebels. On the conclusion of these operations, the Viceroy and Governor-General in recognition of the eminent services rendered to the British Government by the State of Nipal, declared his intention to restore to the Maharajah the whole of the low lands lying between the River Kali and the District of Gorukpore, which belonged to the State of Nipal in 1815, and were ceded to the British Government in that year by the aforesaid Treaty. These lands have now been identified by Commissioners appointed for the purpose by the British Government, in the presence of Commissioners deputed by the Nipal Darbar; masonry pillars have been erected to mark the future boundary of the two States, and the territory has been formally delivered over to the Nipalese Authorities. In order the more firmly to secure the State of Nipal in the perpetual possession of this territory, and to mark in a solemn way the occasion of its restoration, the following Treaty has been concluded between the two States:

Article 1st: All Treaties and Engagements now in force between the British Government and the Maharajah of Nipal, except in so far as they may be altered by this Treaty, are hereby confirmed.

Article 2nd: The British Government hereby bestows on the Maharajah of Nipal in full sovereignty, the whole of the lowlands between the Rivers Kali and Raptee, and the whole of the lowlands lying between the River Raptee and the District of Gorukpore, which were in the possession of the Nipal State in the year 1815, and were ceded to the British Government by Article III of the Treaty concluded at Segowlee on the 2nd of December in that year.

Article 3rd: The boundary line surveyed by the British Commissioners appointed for the purpose extending eastward from the River Kali or Sardah to the foot of the hills north of Bagowra Tal, and marked by pillars, shall henceforth be the boundary between the British Province of Oudh and the Territories of the Maharajah of Nipal.

== See also ==
- Treaty of Sugauli
- Nepal–Britain Treaty of 1923
