= Akhil Bharat Nepali Ekta Samaj =

Indian Nepalese insurgent association

- Leaders: Bhot Bahadur Thapa Hemraj; Singh Gaman Khtri
- Active regions: Northeast India, Uttar Pradesh & Bihar (India)
- Ideology: Maoism; Nepalese unity in India; Greater Nepal

Akhil Bharat Nepali Ekta Samaj (Nepali and Hindi: The All-India Nepalese Unity Society; ABNES) is a group founded in 1979 in Varanasi, India, whose stated purpose is to work for the unity amongst, and welfare of Nepalese people residing in India. ABNES was registered in the Hindu-sacred city of Varanasi (Benaras), in 1979. Varanasi traditionally maintained it connections with country of Nepal and the Nepalese traditions. It gradually evolved into a terrorist front organization for the Maoist insurgents of Nepal. In July 2002 it was declared a terrorist organization, and banned by the Ministry of Home Affairs. Following this designation, Janardhan Thapa, an executive member of the group's central committee, announced that they would change their name and focus on "social and cultural activities".

== Leadership ==
The Delhi-based Ram Prasad Sharma is reportedly the president of ABNES. Raju Nepali is the reportedly the general secretary of the organization and is based in Chennai, in the southern Indian State of Tamil Nadu. Amrit Thapa, who resides in the eastern Indian metropolis of Kolkata, in West Bengal, which borders Nepal, is believed to be the vice president of ABNES. Its most active leader in Delhi was ABNES secretary Bamdev Chettri, an employee at Jawaharlal Nehru University, till he was arrested on September 6, 2002, and subsequently deported. Reports indicate that Chettri went underground in June 2002. Police arrested him on September 6, 2002.

== Objectives ==
This organization was registered with the stated objective of securing unity among immigrant Nepalese residing in India and working for their welfare. However, ABNES gradually became involved in terrorism and began to function as a front for the Maoist insurgents of Nepal. It is also believed that the organization is working for the proliferation of greater Nepal idea.

== Area of activity and cadres ==
Over the past few years, ABNES has established an extensive network all over India. It has a strong base in northern Bengal and is active in Northeast India, Uttar Pradesh and Bihar, in areas inhabited by ethnic Nepalese, and in stretches bordering Nepal.

The organization has a fairly large cadre base and an expanding membership, though their numbers is not known.

== Affiliations ==
ABNES has links with the Nepal Maoists and it works as a front organization for them. A youth organisation known as the Akhil Bharatiya Nepali Vidyarthi Sangh, headed by a Kolkata-based girl named Saraswati Mohra, is closely linked to the activities of ABNES.

== Activities ==
Available information indicates that ABNES is actively engaged in raising funds for the Maoist insurgents as well as in recruiting cadres for the insurgents from among the Nepalese settlers in India. Its extensive network is also used to provide shelter to insurgents who either flee onslaughts by the security forces of Nepal or are injured in battles with them. Reports further indicate that ABNES has been extending support to secession elements in the Kalapani area. Also, it is believed that they have ties with left-wing extremists– of the People's War Group (PWG) and Maoist Communist Centre (MCC), who have strong ties with the Maoist insurgents. The PWG, MCC and the Maoist insurgents are members of a left-wing extremist coalition, Coordinating Committee of Maoist Parties and Organisations in South Asia (CCOMPOSA), which was founded in mid-2001.
