= Naya Muluk =

Region in Nepal

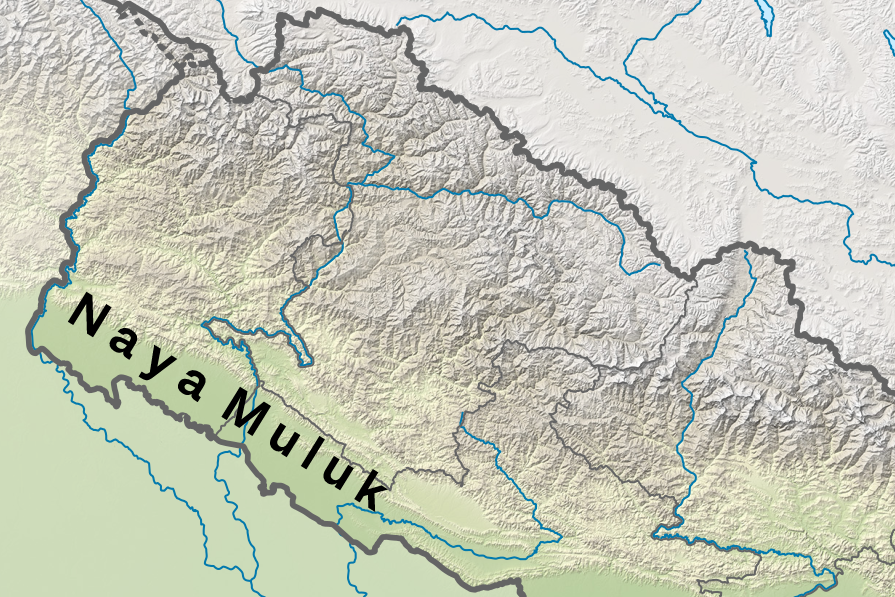
Naya Muluk, which returned to Nepal in 1860

Naya Muluk (Nepali: नयाँ मुलुक) is a geographical region of Nepal, which is situated in the south-western part of Nepal. The Terai land between Kali River and Rapti River was called "Naya Muluk" after 1860.

== History ==
After the Anglo-Nepalese War in 1814–1816, Nepal was forced to sign a treaty called the Sugauli Treaty in which Nepal lost one third of its geographical territory. The geographical territory was sectioned in five parts as below:

1. The whole of the lowlands between the Rivers Kali and Rapti.
2. The whole of the low lands lying between the Rapti and the Gunduck.
3. The whole of the lowlands between the Gunduck and Coosah.
4. All the low lands between the Rivers Mitchee and the Teestah.
5. All the territories within the hills east of the River Mitchee and all territories west of Kali.

Sections 2 and 3 (the whole land from Rapti to Gundak and Gandak to Koshi) were restored to Nepal on December 11, 1816.

Section 1 (whole low land between the Rivers Kali and Rapti) was returned in 1860 and is called Naya Muluk.

== Territory ==
South-west frontier of Nepal with Oudh state in 1832

Naya muluk contains two districts of Sudurpashchim province and two districts of Lumbini Province. The total area is 9,207 square kilometres (3,555 sq mi) and the total population is 2,144,846.

Districts	Area (KM^{2})	Population
Kanchanpur	1,610	451,248
Kailali	3,235	775,709
Bardia	2,025	426,576
Banke	2,337	491,313
