= India–Nepal Treaty of Peace and Friendship =

1950 treaty between Nepal and India

Indo-Nepal Treaty of Peace and Friendship
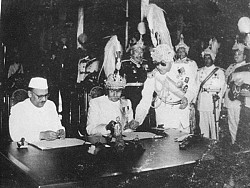
- The Prime Minister of Nepal, Mohan Shamsher Jang Bahadur Rana, and the Indian Ambassador to Nepal, Chandeshwar Prasad Narayan Singh, signing the treaty, 31 July 1950
- Type: Bilateral treaty
- Signed: 31 July 1950
- Location: Kathmandu
- Sealed: 31 July 1950
- Effective: 31 July 1950
- Condition: In Force
- Parties: India; Nepal
- Languages: English

The 1950 India-Nepal Treaty of Peace and Friendship (official name: Treaty of Peace and Friendship Between the Government of India and Government of Nepal) is a bilateral treaty signed by the Kingdom of Nepal and the Republic of India to establish a close strategic relationship between the two South Asian neighbours. The treaty was signed in Kathmandu on 31 July 1950 by the last Rana Prime Minister of Nepal, Mohan Shumsher Jang Bahadur Rana, and the Indian ambassador to Nepal, Chadreshwar Narayan Singh, and came into force the same day as per Article 9 of the Treaty. Rana rule in Nepal ended just 3 months after the treaty was signed. The treaty allows free movement of people and goods between the two nations and a close relationship and collaboration on matters of defence and foreign policy.

== Provisions ==
The India-Nepal Treaty of Peace and Friendship was signed by the last Rana Prime Minister of Nepal, Mohan Shamsher Jang Bahadur Rana, and the Indian Ambassador to Nepal, Chandreshwor Narayan Singh on 31 July 1950 and came into force the same day. It has ten articles. The treaty provides for everlasting peace and friendship between the two countries and the two governments agree mutually to acknowledge and respect the complete sovereignty, territorial integrity and independence of each other.

As per Articles 6 and 7, the two governments agree to grant, on a reciprocal basis, to the nationals of one country in the territories of the other, the same privileges in the matter of residence, ownership of property (requires RBI permission), participation in trade and commerce, movement and other privileges of a similar nature. This enables Nepalese and Indian citizens to move freely across the border without passport or visa, live and work in either country and own property or conduct trade or business in either country. There are a large number of Indians living, owning property and working or doing business in Nepal as a beneficial aspect of the treaty for India. Reciprocally, many Nepalese live, own property and conduct business freely in India.

For centuries, Nepal remained in self-imposed isolation. After the 1860 treaty with the East India Company, Prime Minister Jung Bahadur Rana of Nepal allowed Indians to purchase and sell land in Nepal's Terai. After the ascent of Mt. Everest by Edmund Hillary and Tenzing Norgay, Nepal completely lifted its ban on foreigners.

The King of Nepal enacted the Citizenship Act of 1952 that allowed Indians to emigrate to Nepal and acquire Nepalese citizenship. But as more and more Indian immigrants from Bihar started acquiring Nepalese citizenship, most Nepalese became resentful of this provision.

== Text of the Treaty ==
Treaty of Peace and Friendship Between the Government of India and the Government of Nepal.
Signed at Kathmandu, ON 31 July 1950.
The Government of India and the Government of Nepal, recognizing the ancient ties which have happily existed between the two countries;
Desiring still further to strengthen and develop these ties and to perpetuate peace between the two countries;
Have resolved therefore to enter into a Treaty of Peace and Friendship with each other, and have, for this purpose, appointed as their plenipotentiaries the following persons, namely,
The Government of India:
His Excellency Shri Chandreshwar Prasad Narain Singh, Ambassador of India in Nepal.
The Government of Nepal:
Maharaja Mohan Shamsher Jang Bahadur Rana, Prime Minister and Supreme Commander-in-Chief of Nepal,

who having examined each other's credentials and found them good and in due form have agreed as follows:

Article 1
There shall be everlasting peace and friendship between the Government of India and the Government of Nepal. The two Governments agree mutually to acknowledge and respect the complete sovereignty, territorial integrity and independence of each other,

Article 2
The two Governments hereby undertake to inform each other of any serious friction or misunderstanding with any neighbouring State likely to cause any breach in the friendly relations subsisting between the two Governments.

Article 3
In order to establish and maintain the relations referred to in Article 1 the two Governments agree to continue diplomatic relations with each other by means of representatives with such staff as is necessary for the due performance of their functions. The representatives and such of their staff as may be agreed upon shall enjoy such diplomatic privileges and immunities as are customarily granted by international law on a reciprocal basis : Provided that in no case shall these be less than those granted to persons of a similar status of any other State having diplomatic relations with either Government.

Article 4
The two Governments agree to appoint Consuls-General, Consuls, Vice-Consuls and other consular agents, who shall reside in towns, ports and other places in each other's territory as may be agreed to. Consuls-General, Consuls, Vice-Consuls and consular agents shall be provided with exequaturs or other valid authorization of their appointment. Such exequatur or authorization is liable to be withdrawn by the country which issued it, if considered necessary. The reasons for the withdrawal shall be indicated wherever possible. The persons mentioned above shall enjoy on a reciprocal basis all the rights, privileges, exemptions and immunities that are accorded to persons of corresponding status of any other State.

Article 5
The Government of Nepal shall be free to import, from or through the territory of India, arms, ammunition or warlike material and equipment necessary for the security of Nepal. The procedure for giving effect to this arrangement shall be worked out by the two Governments acting in consultation.

Article 6
Each Government undertakes, in token of the neighbourly friendship between India and Nepal, to give to the nationals of the other, in its territory, national treatment with regard to participation in industrial and economic development of such territory and to the grant of concessions and contracts, relating to such development.

Article 7
The Governments of India and Nepal agree to grant, on a reciprocal basis, to the nationals of one country in the territories of the other the same privileges in the matter of residence, ownership of property, participation in trade and commerce, movement and other privileges of a similar nature.

Article 8
So far as matters dealt with herein are concerned, this Treaty cancels all previous Treaties, agreements, and engagements entered into on behalf of India between the British Government and the Government of Nepal.

Article 9
This Treaty shall come into force from the date of signature by both Governments.

Article 10
This Treaty shall remain in force until it is terminated by either party by giving one year's notice.

Done in duplicate at Kathmandu this 31st day of July 1950.

(Signed)
Chandreshwar Prasad Narain Singh
For the Government of India

(Signed)
Mohan Shamsher Jang Bahadur Rana
For the Government of Nepal

Prepared by LP

== Background ==
The Himalayan Nation of Nepal borders northern India in the south, east and west. During British rule in India, Nepal's ties with the British government were governed by the 1816 Treaty of Sugauli that was replaced by the 1923 "Treaty of perpetual peace and friendship" or Nepal–Britain Treaty of 1923. After the independence of India in 1947, the two nations sought to forge close strategic, commercial and cultural relations. The rise of Communist China in 1949 and the subsequent invasion of Tibet heightened security concerns in both India and Nepal. India had maintained good relations with Tibet, but the Rana rulers of Nepal feared that China would support the Communist Party of Nepal and sponsor a communist revolution that would overthrow their autocratic regime.

With heightening concerns over the security threat to India presented by Communist China, which was seen as seeking to project power and influence over Nepal, Sikkim and Bhutan and China's border disputes with India, the latter sought to strengthen its "Himalayan frontier" by forging an alliance on defence and foreign affairs with the Rana rulers of Nepal.

== Criticism ==
This treaty is called unequal by most Nepalese since Nepalese law does not permit an open border, and Indians, by law, should not be able to buy lands and properties in Nepal or carry out businesses in their names. They claim that the 1950 treaty was signed by undemocratic rulers of Nepal and can be scrapped by a one-year notice. The treaty has been unpopular especially among Pahari segments of Nepal, who often regard it as a breach of Nepal's sovereignty. Also, agreements were manipulated in the favour of antidemocratic autocratic rule of Nepal, where the power of the people is fragmented.

== Deterioration of bilateral relations ==
Although initially supported enthusiastically by both the Rana rulers and Indian establishment, the treaty became the subject of increased resentment in Nepal, which saw it as an encroachment of its sovereignty and an unwelcome extension of Indian influence. After an abortive attempt in 1952 of the Communist Party of Nepal to overthrow the autocratic Rana rule with Chinese backing, India and the Rana regime stepped up military and intelligence cooperation under treaty provisions, and India sent a military mission to Nepal which was regarded by leftist Nepalese as an undue extension of Indian influence in Nepal. In the late 1950s and the 1960s, after the advent of democracy in Nepal, Nepal's relations with China improved, while its relations with India deteriorated. Nepal forced the Indian military mission to leave, and both nations began ignoring the treaty provisions.

Nepal was temporarily brought closer to India after the Sino-Indian War in 1962, but it resented the growth of India's regional power in the 1970s. The extensive Indian trade and economic influence was also resented by some in Nepal. In 1975 after the annexation of Sikkim by India, Nepal began openly lobbying for renegotiation of the treaty and proposed itself as a Zone of Peace between India and China, where military competition would be off-limits. India refused to endorse the proposal.

=== Proposed scrapping ===
Upon forming a coalition government after the 2008 Nepalese Constituent Assembly election, the leader of the Communist Party of Nepal (Maoist) Pushpa Kamal Dahal said on 24 April 2008 that the 1950 treaty would be scrapped and a new pact would be negotiated with India. However, he did not pursue the matter and had to resign as prime minister within nine months. However, in 2014, both India and Nepal agreed to "review" and "adjust" the peace treaty to reflect the current realities.

=== Nepal India Open Border Dialogue Group ===
People of Terai region of Nepal and Indian state of Bihar formed a group Nepal India Open Border Dialogue Group. Initially the group formed to understand the issue related to flooding in Nepal India Border later the group started advocating for open border and organised several seminar.

== Revision of the Treaty ==
In January 2021, Nepal Foreign Minister Pradeep Kumar Gyawali said, that Nepal wants India to review and revise the 1950 Indo-Nepal Treaty to reflect the changes and new realities.

== See also ==
- India–Nepal relations
- Common Travel Area, a similar treaty existing between the UK and Ireland on freedom of movement.
- Union State, a similar treaty existing between Russia and Belarus on freedom of movement.
