= Treaty of Sugauli =

1816 boundary treaty between the East India Company and Nepal

Sugauli Treaty सुगौली सन्धि
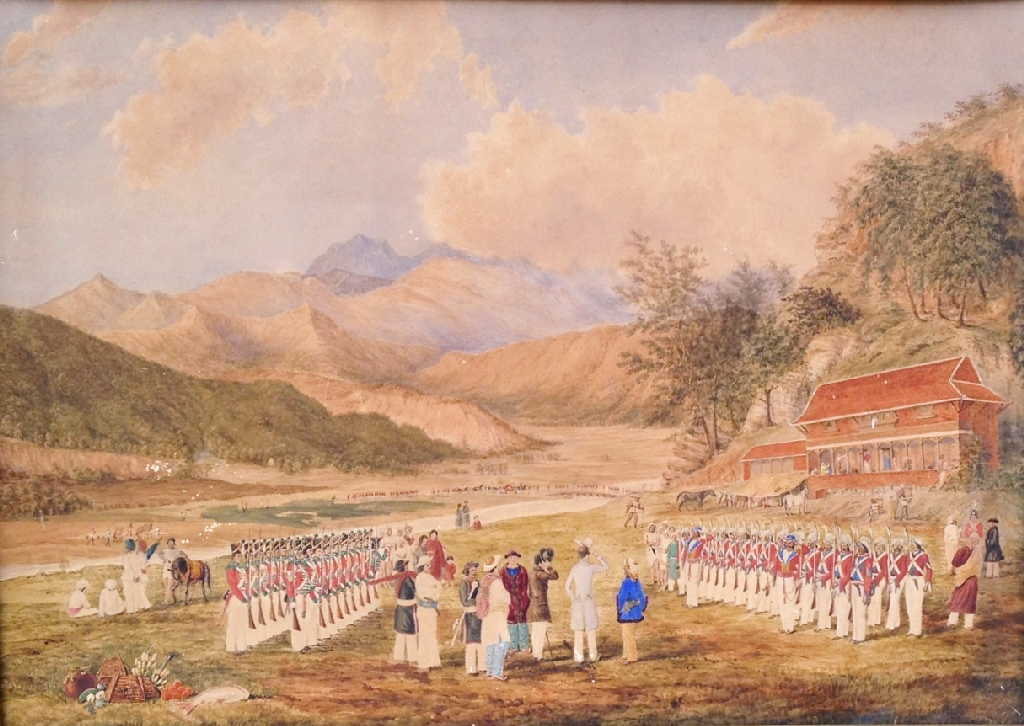
- Bhimsen Thapa's Gorkha troops (right) at Segauli, (c. 1849)
- Drafted: 2 December 1815
- Signed: 4 March 1816
- Location: Sugauli, India
- Expiration: None
- Signatories: Parish Bradshaw; Guru Gajaraj Mishra
- Parties: East India Company; Kingdom of Nepal
- Language: Persian

Full text
- Treaty of Sugauli at Wikisource

The Treaty of Sugauli (also spelled Sugowlee, Sagauli and Segqulee), that established much of the modern borders of Nepal, was signed on 4 March 1816 between the East India Company and the Kingdom of Nepal, represented by Guru Gajraj Mishra, following the Anglo-Nepalese War of 1814–16.

== Background ==
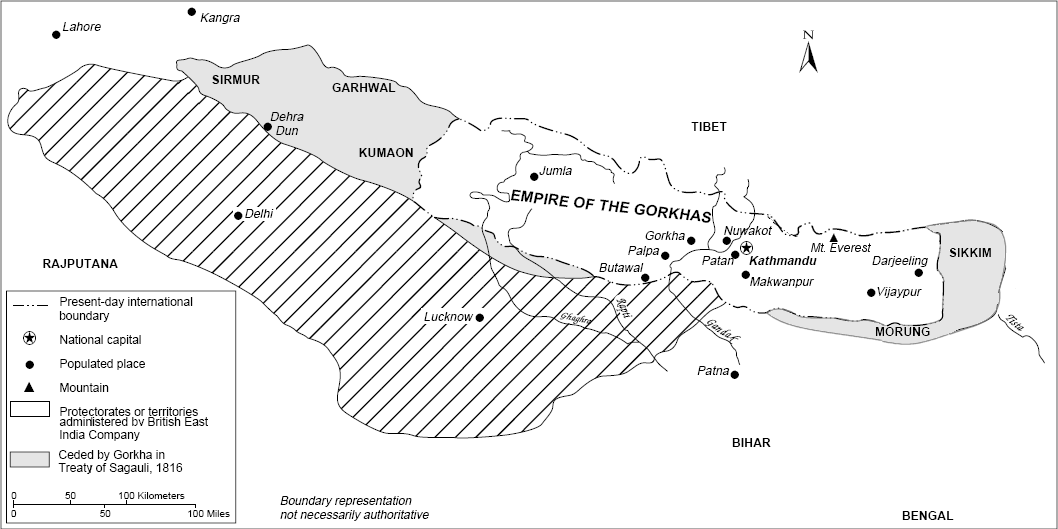
The territorial effects of the Treaty of Sugauli (1816)

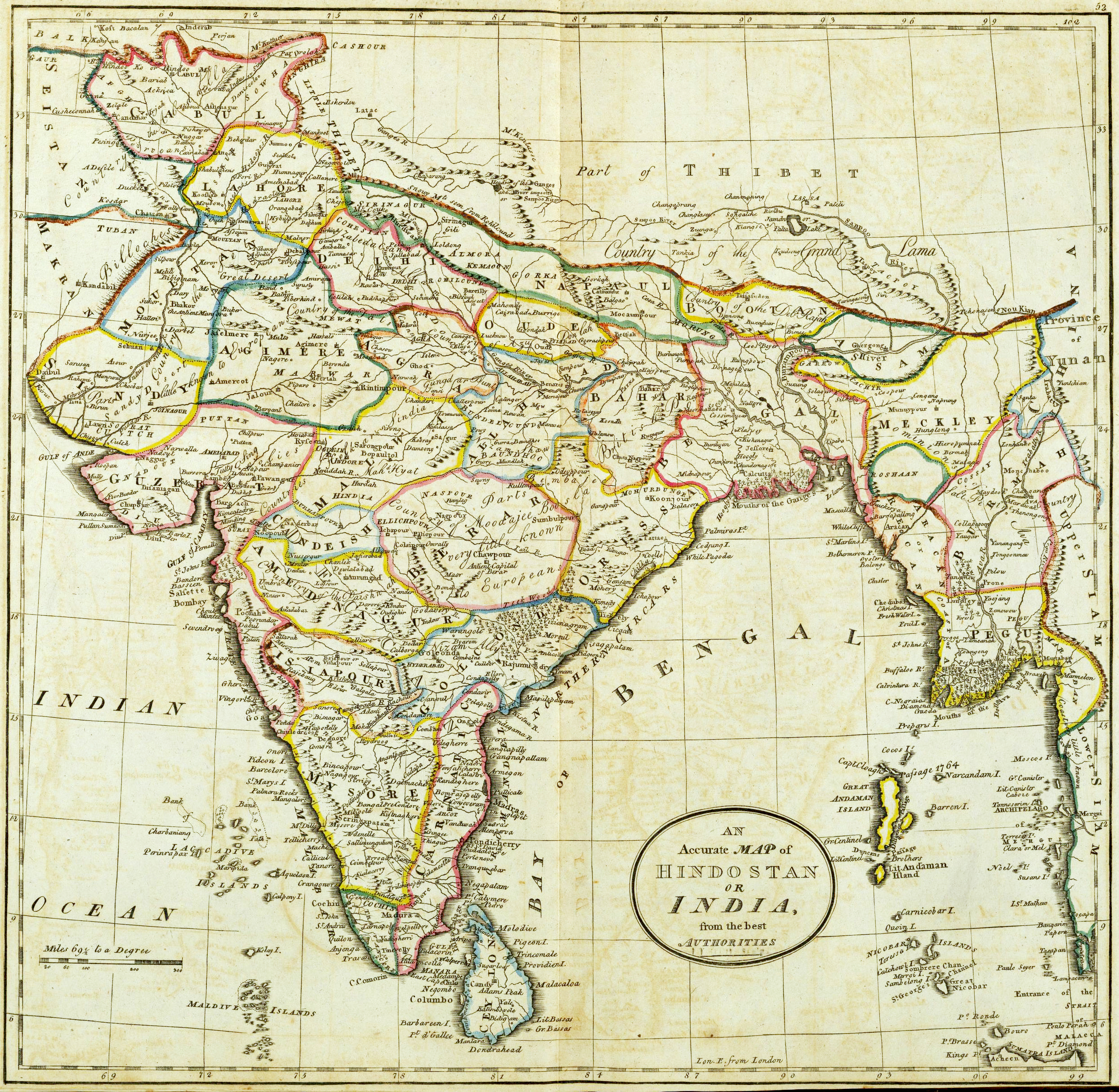
Map of Hindostan or India (1814) by Mathew Carey.

Following the unification of Nepal under Prithvi Narayan Shah, Nepal attempted to expand its domains, conquering much of Sikkim in the east and, in the west, the basins of Gandaki and Karnali and the Uttarakhand regions of Garhwal and Kumaon. This brought them into conflict with the British, who controlled directly or indirectly the northeastern Indian plains between Delhi and Calcutta. A series of campaigns termed the Anglo-Nepalese War occurred in 1814–1816. In 1815 the British general David Ochterlony evicted the Nepalese from Garhwal and Kumaon across the Kali River, ending their 12-year occupation, which is remembered for its brutality and repression.

Octherlony offered peace terms to the Nepalese demanding British suzerainty in the form of a British resident and the delimitation of Nepal's territories corresponding roughly to its present-day boundaries. The Nepalese refusal to accede to the terms led to another campaign the following year, targeting the Kathmandu Valley, after which the Nepalese capitulated.

== Terms ==
Historian John Whelpton writes:

Negotiations for a general settlement produced a draft which was initialled at Sagauli in Bihar in December 1815 and required Nepal to give up all territories west and east of its present-day borders, to surrender the entire Tarai and to accept a permanent British representative (or 'resident') in Kathmandu. The Nepalese government initially balked at these terms, but agreed to ratify them in March 1816 after Ochterloney occupied the Makwanpur Valley only thirty miles from the capital.

== Geographic context ==
Nepal boasts a salt trade route to Tibet that has been in use for many centuries. This was significant to the economic well-being of the Kathmandu valley. As the British East India Company had profited from Indian trade routes, Nepal's trade routes were desirable to conquer.

Nepal was a relatively newly established nation that did not have well-established boundaries with law enforcement around the supposed borders. In conjunction with its frustration with this, and its desire for the trade routes, the East India Company declared war against Nepal known as the Anglo-Nepalese War from 1814 to 1816. Nepal's advantage lay in their highly esteemed army of men known as the Gurkhas who were also of interest to the company. As a smaller and less developed country, Nepal eventually relented in the war and agreed upon a ceasefire under the terms and conditions of the Sugauli Treaty.

== Reasons the Treaty was signed ==
Three of the main goals of the company were to employ Nepal's impressive army, establish a presence of supervision in the Nepali court, and utilise its trading routes to Tibet. Naturally, the decision to sign the treaty was not treated with full acceptance by the Nepali court and roused a large point of controversy. Bhimsen Thapa, Nepal's prime minister at the time "realised that the best way to ensure Nepal's continued freedom from interference was to grant the governor-general's basic desire, a secure and trouble-free border". In attempts to mitigate the infringement on Nepal's sovereignty and internal security, the treaty was signed. From the British perspective, the costs of colonising Nepal were impractical in comparison to placing certain aspects of the country under British control.

== Effects of the Treaty ==
The treaty stipulated that Nepal's government structure be without external interference and that aside from the singular British resident in the Nepali court, their national affairs would not be compromised. In addition to the benefit of Nepal's continued sovereign independence, an alliance was established between the two governments.

== Implementation of the western boundary ==
Article 5 of the treaty required Nepal to cede "the whole of the lowlands between the rivers Kali and Rapti" and "all the hill territories" west of the Kali River. The Kali River was thus established as the western boundary of Nepal, and the annexed territories of Kumaon and Garhwal came under British administration.

=== Division of the Byans region ===
One of the first disputes arising from the treaty concerned the Byans region in the extreme north-east of Kumaon, where the upper Kali River splits into multiple headwater streams. The entire Byans region — including the villages of Chhangru and Tinkar on the eastern bank of the Kali — had been part of Kumaon before the Gorkha conquest in 1791, and was considered distinct from the kingdoms of Doti and Jumla to the south.

In 1817, the Nepali governor Bam Shah claimed the villages of Changru and Tinkar on the grounds that they lay east of the Kali and therefore fell within Nepal's territory under the treaty. The British conceded these two villages. However, Bam Shah then advanced a further claim to the villages of Kunti and Nabhi, arguing that the western branch of the headwaters (the Kuthi Yankti, which carries the larger volume of water) should be considered the main stream of the Kali, and that the boundary should therefore follow it rather than the lesser eastern stream flowing from the Kalapani springs.

This claim was investigated by the surveyor Captain W. S. Webb and Commissioner G. W. Traill, who reported that the eastern stream from the Kalapani springs had always been recognised as the main branch of the Kali by the local Bhotia inhabitants, and that ceding the villages would create a constant source of conflict over transit duties on the trade to Tibet through the Lipu Lekh pass. The Governor-General, Lord Moira, firmly rejected the claim in September 1817.

When the zamindars of Byans were informed of the decision to transfer Changru and Tinkar to Nepal, they petitioned Commissioner Traill in March 1817, stating that the remaining six villages on the British side — Budhi, Garbyang, Nabi, Rongkong, Gunji and Kuti — were entirely dependent on the agricultural production of Changru and Tinkar, and that they would be forced to desert their villages if the transfer proceeded.

The parganah of Byans was thus divided between two countries, with seven villages remaining in British Kumaon and two in Nepal. The boundary question raised by Bam Shah in 1817 — which stream constitutes the border — remained dormant for nearly two centuries before resurfacing as the modern Kalapani-Limpiyadhura dispute.

== Aftermath ==
The treaty saw three decades of peace following its implementation, however, other issues began to arise starting in 1840.

“An army mutiny over proposed pay reductions almost turned into an attack on the British residency because the soldiers were led to believe that the cuts had been forced on the Nepalese government by the British” in June 1840"

This followed as a result of suspicions that arose in the Nepali court that its independence in internal government affairs was being infringed upon. Another incidence of alarm occurred in 1842 during a debt lawsuit over an Indian Merchant, Kasinath Mull. The British resident in the Nepalese court, Brian Hodgson appeared hostile and assertive, implicating attempted control over the independence of decision in the court. Through these issues, the success of the treaty's attempt to buffer tensions may still be debated.

=== Boundary Treaty of 1860 ===
During the Indian Rebellion of 1857, a division of Gurkha soldiers was sent to the war in support of the British and aided in its success, establishing a friendlier form of diplomacy that ultimately called for a revision in the Sugauli Treaty that panned more positively in favor of Nepal's independence and territorial integrity. This would be called the Boundary Treaty of 1860.

=== Ongoing disputes ===
Among the border disputes arising from the treaty, the most significant are over the Kalapani territory, a 35-square-kilometre (14 sq mi) area at the India–Nepal–China tripoint in Uttarakhand, and Susta, a 20-square-kilometre (7.7 sq mi) to 140-square-kilometre (54 sq mi) area in southern Nepal. The Kalapani dispute traces directly to the question first raised by Bam Shah in 1817 regarding which headwater stream constitutes the main Kali River. Nepal's 2020 political map, which included Kalapani, Lipulekh and Limpiyadhura as Nepali territory, effectively revived Bam Shah's original claim after more than two centuries. In August 2026, it was reported that, the Nepalese government might have lost the original treaty papers.

== See also ==
- Nepal–Britain Treaty of 1860
- 1950 Indo-Nepal Treaty of Peace and Friendship
- Gurkha War
- Naya Muluk: land in western Terai restored to Nepal in 1860
- Sikkim
- Byans
- Kuthi Valley
- Tinkar Valley
- Bam Shah

== Bibliography ==
- Atkinson, Edwin Thomas (1981) [first published 1884], The Himalayan Gazetteer, Volume 2, Part 2, Cosmo Publications – via archive.org
- Atkinson, Edwin Thomas (1981) [first published 1884], The Himalayan Gazetteer, Volume 3, Part 2, Cosmo Publications – via archive.org
- Chatterjee, Bishwa B. (January 1976), "The Bhotias of Uttarakhand", India International Centre Quarterly, 3 (1): 3–16, JSTOR 23001864
- Cowan, Sam (2015), The Indian checkposts, Lipu Lekh, and Kalapani, School of Oriental and African Studies
- Dhungel, Dwarika Nath; Pun, Santa Bahadur (2014), "Nepal-India Relations: Territorial/Border Issue with Specific Reference to Mahakali River", FPRC Journal, New Delhi: Foreign Policy Research Centre – via academia.edu
- Manandhar, Mangal Siddhi; Koirala, Hriday Lal (June 2001), "Nepal-India Boundary Issue: River Kali as International Boundary", Tribhuvan University Journal, 23 (1)
- Rose, Leo E. (1971), Nepal – Strategy for Survival, University of California Press, ISBN 978-0-520-01643-9
- Rose, Leo E. (January–February 1999), "Nepal and Bhutan in 1998: Two Himalayan Kingdoms", Asian Survey, 39 (1): 155–162, doi:10.2307/2645605, JSTOR 2645605
- Schrader, Heiko (1988), Trading Patterns in the Nepal Himalayas, Bow Historical Books, ISBN 978-3-88156-405-2
- Shrestha, Buddhi N. (2013), "Demarcation of the International Boundaries of Nepal" (PDF), in Haim Srebro (ed.), International Boundary Making, Copenhagen: International Federation of Surveyors, pp. 149–182, ISBN 978-87-92853-08-0
- Upadhya, Sanjay (2012), Nepal and the Geo-Strategic Rivalry between China and India, Routledge, ISBN 978-1-136-33550-1
- Tolia, R.S. (1996). British Kumaon – Garhwal: An Administrative History of a Non-Regulation Hill Province. Almora: Almora Book Depot.
- Walton, H. G., ed. (1911), Almora: A Gazetteer, District Gazetteers of the United Provinces of Agra and Oudh, vol. 35, Government Press, United Provinces – via archive.org
- Whelpton, John (2005), A History of Nepal, Cambridge University Press, ISBN 978-0-521-80470-7
