= Dalbhanjan Pande =

Nepalese politician (d. 1846)

Kaji Dalbhanjan Pande
- श्री काजी दलभञ्जन पाँडे

Personal details
- Died: 14 September 1846 Kot Arsenal, Basantapur Darbar
- Parent: Jagajit Pande (father)
- Relatives: Bamsa Raj Pande (cousin-uncle); Damodar Pande (cousin-uncle); Ranajit Pande (uncle); Mathabarsingh Thapa (cousin-nephew); Rana Jang Pande (second-cousin)

Military service
- Allegiance: Kingdom of Nepal
- Branch/service: Nepali Army
- Rank: Kaji
- Commands: Joint Military Head (1837)
- Battles/wars: Anglo-Nepalese War

Dalbhanjan Pande or Dalabhanjan Pande (Nepali: दलभञ्जन पाँडे) was a Nepalese minister, politician and military officer of the aristocratic Pande family. He had held ministerial positions and military offices. He jointly headed the military administration of Nepal in 1837 along with Mukhtiyar Rana Jang Pande.

== Life as politician and military officer ==
Dalbhanjan followed the King Rana Bahadur Shah into exile to Banaras along with Bhimsen Thapa and the Senior Queen Raj Rajeshwari Devi. In July 1804, he along with Badakaji Amar Singh Thapa informed the Company's in-charge Daroga about the orders of takeover of Butwal plains and honor Palpa's former obligations from the King of Gorkha. After 1806, the territories of Palpa were kept under the military governorship of him and Bada Amar Singh Thapa. In 1806, he was deputed to Kangra Fort along with Rudra Vir Shah as senior military officers after the death of Kaji Nain Singh Thapa in the conquest. He was one of the senior Bharadars to have opposed the Anglo-Nepalese War due to prevalence of weak administration in the western front suggesting a possible revolt from the citizens of the newly conquered west. He was among the seniormost officials who reported to Mukhtiyar Bhimsen Thapa from Makwanpur axis along with Ranabir Singh Thapa during the Anglo-Nepalese War. He left for Peking in 1822 leading the seventh Quinquennial mission to China.

Immediately after the incarceration of the Thapas in 1837, a new government with joint Mukhtiyars was formed with Ranganath Paudel as the head of civil administration, and Dalbhanjan Pande and Rana Jang Pande as joint heads of military administration. The ministry formed after the death of Mathabarsingh Thapa included him along with Chautariya Fateh Jung Shah, Gagan Singh Bhandari and Abhiman Singh Rana Magar. He was awarded the rank of General along with the one regiment of soldiers under his administration. He was killed in the Kot Massacre in 1846 by the Kunwar Rana brothers. He was a Kaji officer from at least 1816 to 1838 A.D. making him the leader of Tularam Pande family, then known as Gora (White) Pande faction. Pande died in the Kot massacre on 14 September 1846.

== Family ==
He was the son of Sardar Jagajit Pande of Gora (White) Pande faction belonging to Pande family. He was a grandson of Kaji Tularam Pande who died in the Battle of Kathmandu. He had brothers - Janga Bir, Birbhanjan and Singha Bir, all of whom reached the position of Kaji in their lifetime. His uncle Ranajit Pande was once a Mulkaji while the other uncle Bhotu Pande was a military officer in the offence of Sino-Nepalese War.

== Gallery ==
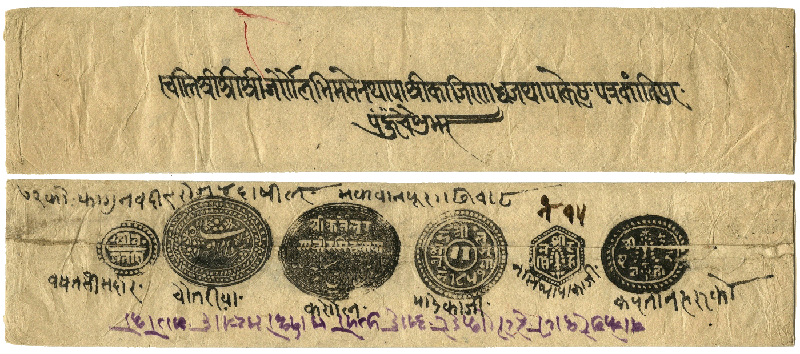
Letter sent by Senior officers at Makwanpur axis during Anglo-Nepalese War to Mukhtiyar Bhimsen Thapa; third from right is Dalbhanjan's private black seal

== Bibliography ==
- Acharya, Baburam (2012), Acharya, Shri Krishna (ed.), Janaral Bhimsen Thapa : Yinko Utthan Tatha Pattan (in Nepali), Kathmandu: Education Book House, p. 228, ISBN 9789937241748
- Nepal, Gyanmani (2007), Nepal ko Mahabharat (in Nepali) (3rd ed.), Kathmandu: Sajha, p. 314, ISBN 9789993325857
- Oldfield, Henry Ambrose (1880), Sketches from Nipal, Vol 1, vol. 1, London: W.H. Allan & Co.
- Pemble, John (2009), "Forgetting and remembering Britain's Gurkha War", Asian Affairs, 40 (3): 361–376, doi:10.1080/03068370903195154, S2CID 159606340
- Pradhan, Kumar L. (2012), Thapa Politics in Nepal: With Special Reference to Bhim Sen Thapa, 1806–1839, New Delhi: Concept Publishing Company, p. 278, ISBN 9788180698132
- Shaha, Rishikesh (1982). Essays in the Practice of Government in Nepal. Manohar. OCLC 9302577.
- Karmacharya, Ganga (2005), Queens in Nepalese Politics: an account of roles of Nepalese queens in state affairs, 1775-1846, Nepal: Educational Publishing House, ISBN 9789994633937
- Manandhar, Triratna; Mishra, Tirtha Prasad (1986), Nepal's Quinquennial mission to China, Purna Devi Tuladhar and Pushpa Mishra
- Michael, B. A. (2014). Statemaking and Territory in South Asia: Lessons from the Anglo–Gorkha War (1814–1816). Anthem Press. p. 151. ISBN 9781783083220.
