= Ganesh Pandey =

Nepali politician

Ganesh Pade श्री गणेश पाण्डे

Kaji of Gorkha Kingdom
- In office September 1559 – ?
- Monarch: Dravya Shah
- Preceded by: established

Personal details
- Born: ~1540 AD Aslewa in Modern day Nepal
- Relatives: Pande family

Ganesh Pandey or Ganesa Pande (Nepali: गणेश पाण्डे वा गणेश पाँडे) was a Kaji of Gorkha Kingdom.

== Coronation of Dravya Shah ==
Dravya Shah was the youngest son of Yasho Brahma Shah, Raja (King) of Lamjung and grandson of Kulamandan Shah Khad, the Raja (King) of Kaski. He became the king of Gorkha with the help of accomplices namely Kaji Ganesh Pandey. He ascended the throne of Gorkha on 1559 A.D. 19th century writer Daniel Wright describes the coronation of Dravya Shah as:

On Wednesday the 8th of Bhadon Badi, Saka 1481 (A.D. 1559) Rohini Nakshatra (i.e. the moon in the Rohini mansion) being an auspicious day, Drabya Shah aided by Bhagirath Panth, Ganesa Pande, Keshav Bohara, Gangaram Rana Magar, Busal Arjyal, Khanal and Murli Khawas of Gorkha, concealed himself in a hut. Ganesa Pande had collected all the people of who wore the brahmanical thread such as the Thapas, Busals, Ranas and Maski Ranas of the Magar tribe, they went by the Dahya Gauda route and the Durbar. Drabya Shah killed the Khadka Raja Mansingh Khadka Magar (Note: Khadka Raja belonged to magars tribe.) his own hand, with a sword, during the battle ensued. At the same auspicious moment Drabya took his seat on the gaddi, amidst the clash music.

— History of Nepaul

== Descendants ==
Ganesh Pandey was the first Kaji (Prime Minister) of King Dravya Shah of Gorkha Kingdom established in 1559 A.D. The Pandes were considered as Thar Ghar aristrocratic group who assisted the administration of Gorkha Kingdom. Kaji Kalu Pande (1714-1757) belonged to this family became a war hero after he died at Battle of Kirtipur. These Pandes were categorized with fellow Chhetri Bharadars such as Thapas, Basnyats and Kunwars.

The inscription installed by son of Tularam Pande, Kapardar Bhotu Pande, on the Bishnumati bridge explains their patrilineal relationship to Ganesh Pande, Minister of Drabya Shah, the first King of Gorkha Kingdom. The lineage mentions Ganesh Pande's son as Vishwadatta and Vishwadatta's son as Birudatta. Birudatta had two sons Baliram and Jagatloka. Tularam and Bhimraj were sons of Baliram and Jagatloka respectively. Kaji Kalu Pande was the son of Bhimraj. Bhotu Pande mentions Tularam, Baliram, and Birudatta respectively as his ancestors of three generations. However, Historian Baburam Acharya contends a major flaw in the inscription. Ranajit Pande, the second son of Tularam was born in 1809 Vikram Samvat. Baburam Acharya assumed 25 years for each generation where he found Vishwadatta to have been born in 1707 Vikram Samvat. Thus, on this basis, he concluded that Vishwadatta could not have been the son of Ganesh Pande, who was living in 1616 Vikram Samvat, when Drabya Shah was crowned King of Gorkha. He points that the names of two more generations seem to be missing.

== Death ==
During the expansion under King Ram Shah, Kaji Ganesh Pandey led the army against Ghale Raja of Sallayan, in which the Kaji died in the combat. Shah was furious and ordered the soldiers to go back "for running from the field of battle and ordered them to go back to redeem their hounour, which they finally did". Ghale Raja was defeated and killed by a sword.
