= Battle of Bhaktapur =

1769 battle

The Battle of Bhaktapur
- Part of Unification of Nepal
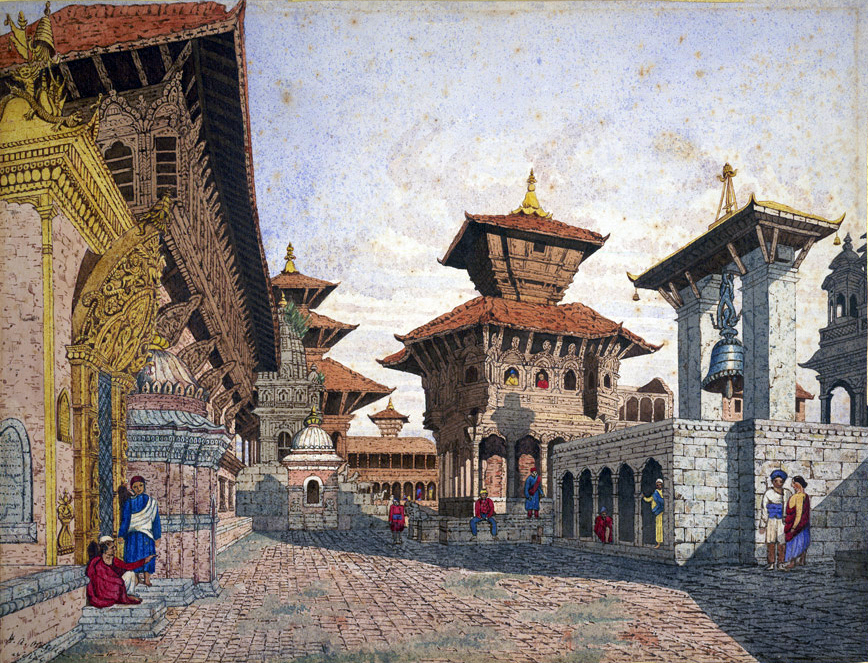
- Bhaktapur Durbar Square, the royal palace complex, in 1854.
Date	1769
Location	Bhaktapur
Result	Gorkhali victory

Belligerents
Kingdom of Bhaktapur	Kingdom of Gorkha

Commanders and leaders
Ranajit Malla; Jayaprakash Malla; Chautara Bhagiram Pradhananga; Abadhutish Malla	Prithvi Narayan Shah; Vamsharaj Pande; Surapratap Shah; Swarup Singh Karki

Strength
3,000–8,000	20,000

Casualties and losses
2,001 killed 501 houses set on fire	400

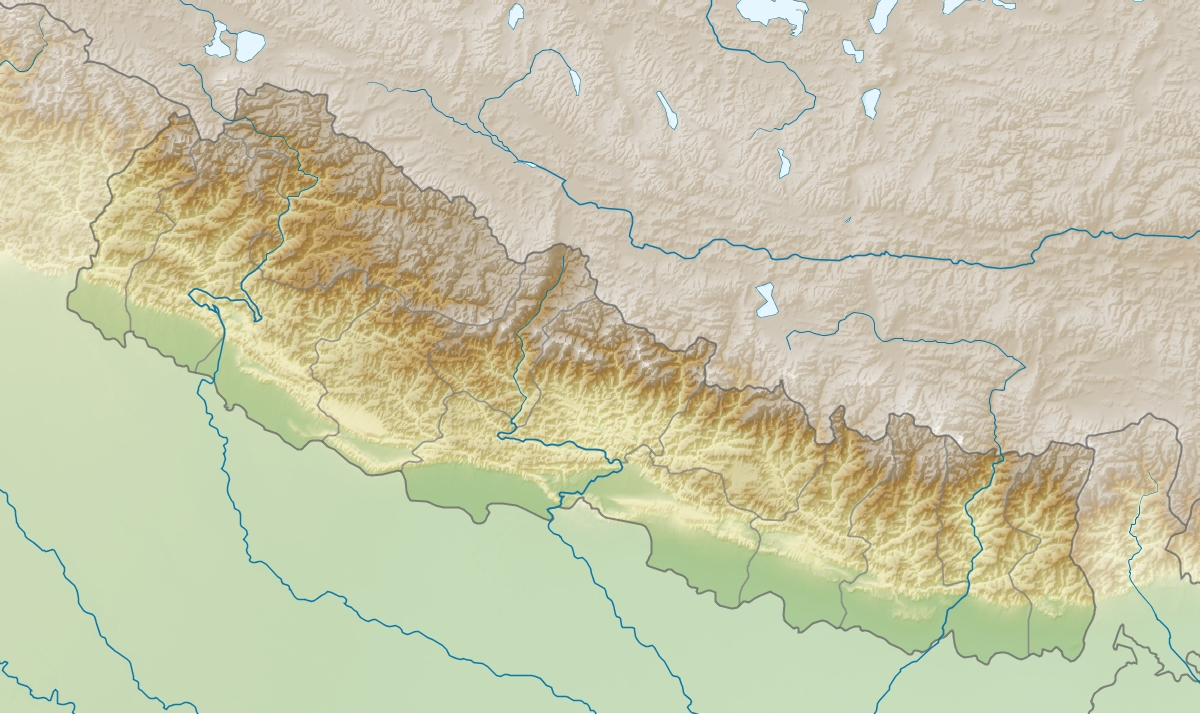
Location in present-day Nepal

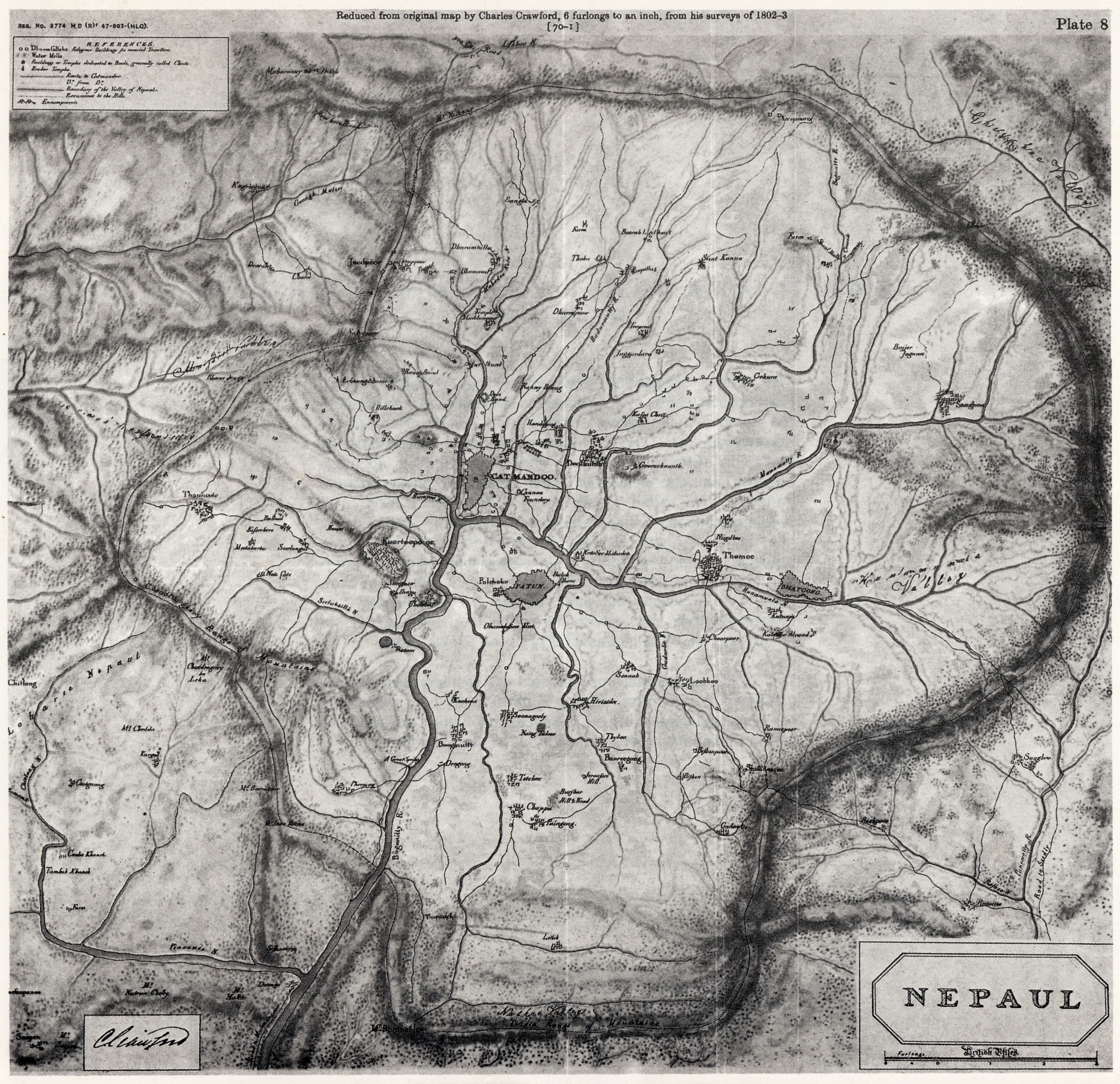
1802 map of Kathmandu Valley

The Battle of Bhaktapur was the final campaign in the Gorkha conquest of Nepal. It took place in Bhaktapur in 1769, and resulted in the victory of the Gorkhali king Prithvi Narayan Shah, giving him control of the entire Kathmandu Valley and adjoining areas.

Shah thus established the Shah dynasty in Nepal, and the rule of Newar Mallas came to an end. The defeated king of Bhaktapur, Ranajit Malla, was sent into exile in India.

== Blockade ==
Bhaktapur (alternative names: Khwopa Desa ख्वप देस, Bhadgaon) was one of the three capital cities in the Malla confederacy of Nepal, the other two being Kathmandu and Lalitpur. The eastern boundary of the kingdom of Bhaktapur extended to a distance of five-six days' journey to the east. The city contained 12,000 households.

The Gorkhalis desired the Kathmandu Valley due to its rich culture, trade, industry and agriculture. In 1736, the Gorkhali king Nara Bhupal Shah launched an attack on Nuwakot, a border town and fort in the northwest of the valley, and was roundly defeated. His son Prithvi Narayan Shah became king in 1742 and resumed the campaign.

As Shah knew he would not be able to take the valley by force, he decided to impose an embargo with a view to starve it. His forces occupied strategic passes in the surrounding hills, and strangled the vibrant trade between Tibet and India that passed through the valley. Blockade runners found with salt or cotton on them were hanged on the road.

In 1744, the Gorkhalis took Nuwakot on the trans-Himalayan trade route. In 1762 and 1763, they overran Makwanpur and Dhulikhel respectively, surrounding the Kathmandu Valley from the west, south and east.

In a bid to cause a famine, Shah prevented any grain from passing into the valley, and blockade runners were hanged from the trees on the roads. The prolonged siege forced the king of Kathmandu to appeal to the British East India Company for help. In August 1767, Captain George Kinloch led a British force towards the valley to rescue its beleaguered inhabitants. He reached within 75 km of Kathmandu and captured the forts at Sindhuli and Hariharpur, but was forced to retreat after supplies ran out and his troops mutinied.

== Final battle ==
Wearing down the Newars with a continuous embargo and propaganda campaign, Shah captured Kirtipur, Kathmandu and Lalitpur in succession. He then marched upon Bhaktapur in 1769. The kings of Kathmandu and Lalitpur, Jaya Prakash Malla and Tej Narasingh Malla, had sought refuge in Bhaktapur after losing their kingdoms. The three kings joined forces to do battle with the Gorkhali army, but they were defeated, again due to betrayal by the nobles.

The soldiers of the treacherous nobles opened the city gates and let the Gorkhalis in. Shah's troops possessed muskets, in addition to swords and bows and arrows. There was fierce fighting in front of the palace, but the invaders finally broke through the gates.

According to the journal kept at the monastery of Jana Baha, Kathmandu, Shah's troops captured Bhaktapur on the night of November 25, 1769. They killed 2,001 people and set 501 houses on fire.

Ranajit Malla was allowed to leave for Varanasi because of his age. Jaya Prakash died from a bullet wound while Tej Narasingh was kept in chains till his death.

The conquest of Bhaktapur marked the end of the Malla dynasty and the rise of the Shah dynasty in Nepal. The Shahs' reign lasted until 2008 when the country became a republic.

== Malla's departure ==
King Ranajit Malla of Bhaktapur was so distressed that he was driven to compose a lament filled with regret at having trusted the Gorkhali king. According to eyewitnesses, Malla wept uncontrollably when he paused at the hilltop of Chandragiri on the valley rim for one last look at his former kingdom. From Chandragiri, the route descends south and exits the valley to continue on to India.

== See also ==
- Battle of Kathmandu
- Battle of Lalitpur
- Battle of Kirtipur
