= Tularam Pande =

Military personnel, diplomat and politician in Gorkha Kingdom

Shree Kaji Tularam Pande
- श्री काजी तुलाराम पाँडे

Personal details
- Born: circa 1782 V.S. (1725 C.E.) Gorkha region, Gorkha Kingdom
- Died: 27 September 1768 (circa aged 43) Basantapur Darbar, Kathmandu
- Children: Jagajit Pande; Ranajit Pande; Bhotu Pande
- Parent: Baliram Pande (father)

Military service
- Allegiance: Nepal
- Battles/wars: Battles of Unification of Nepal

Tularam Pande (Nepali: तुलाराम पाँडे) was a Nepalese military personnel, diplomat and politician in the Gorkha Kingdom. He was a diplomat who served King Prithvi Narayan Shah of Gorkha. Two of his diplomatic missions were with Dolakha and Kathmandu while the latter remained unsuccessful. He also served as the national military commanders in the forces of Prithvi Narayan Shah. He was the patron of the Gora Pande clan, a minor faction of the Gorkha-based aristocratic Pande family. Some of his patrilineal descendants became influential politicians such as Ranajit Pande and Dalabhanjan Pande in the Nepalese history through their marital ties with the Thapa dynasty. His matrilineal descendants became significantly influential; Queen Tripurasundari of Nepal went on to become Queen Mother of Nepal and Mathawar Singh Thapa – the Prime Minister of Nepal and Jang Bahadur Kunwar Ranaji – the latter period ruler of Kaski and Lamjung and Prime Minister of Nepal.

== Ancestry & Lineage ==
He was born to father Vali Pande or Baliram Pande around 1782 Vikram Samvat. The Pande family tree published by Dr. Dilli Raman Regmi shows him a patrilineal descendant of Ganesh Pande. Tularam’s lineage can be traced through the inscription installed by his son Kapardar Bhotu Pande on the Bishnumati bridge. The inscription explains his patrilineal relationship to Ganesh Pande, Minister of Drabya Shah, the first King of Gorkha Kingdom. The lineage mentions Ganesh Pande's son as Vishwadatta and Vishwadatta's son as Birudatta. Birudatta had two sons Baliram and Jagatloka. Bhotu Pande mentions Tularam, Baliram, and Birudatta respectively as his ancestors of three generations. However, Historian Baburam Acharya contends a major flaw in the inscription. Ranajit Pande, the second son of Tularam was born in 1809 Vikram Samvat. Baburam Acharya assumed 25 years for each generation where he found Vishwadatta to have been born in 1707 Vikram Samvat. Thus, on this basis, he concluded that Vishwadatta could not have been the son of Ganesh Pande, who was living in 1616 Vikram Samvat, when Drabya Shah was crowned King of Gorkha. He points that the names of two more generations seem to be missing.

=== Relation with Kalu Pande ===
Generally, historians conclude his relation to Kaji Kalu Pande of Gorkha. As per historian Baburam Acharya, Tularam was a brother (first cousin) of Bhimraj, the father of Kalu Pande. However, Historian Rishikesh Shah contends that Tularam was a brother of Kalu Pande.

== Career ==
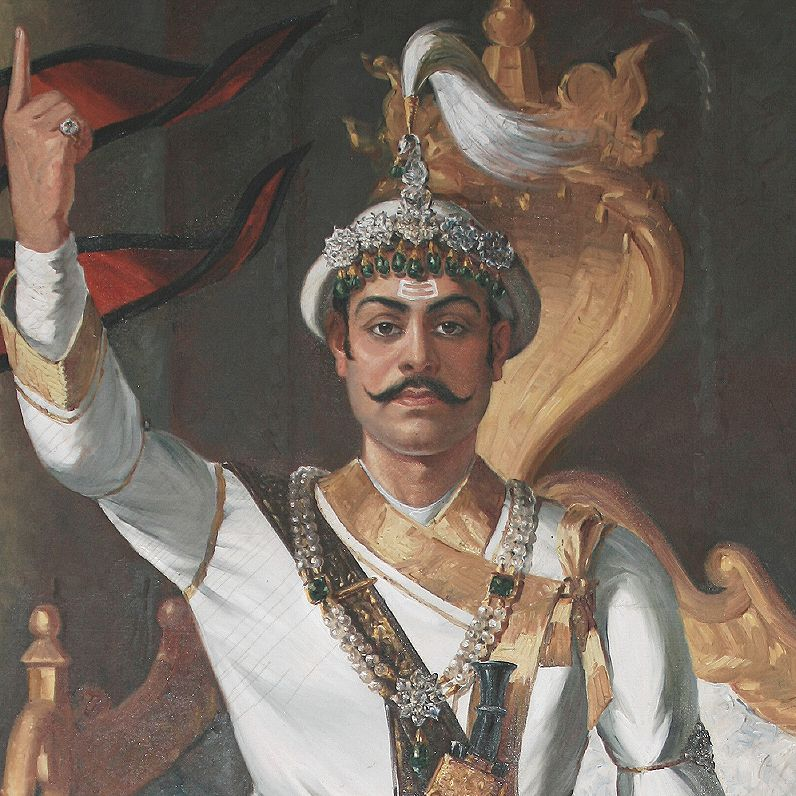
King Prithvi Narayan Shah (1743-1775), King of Gorkha and later unified Kingdom of Nepal

Tularam Pande was one of the military commanders of King Prithvi Narayan Shah. He fought alongside Kalu Pande and Mahoddam Kirti Shah at the Battle of Nuwakot in 1744 A.D. against the forces of Kashiram Thapa, Commander of Kantipur Kingdom. On 1754 A.D., he went on to occupy Dahachok fort with small troops on the orders of Prithvi Narayan Shah. On the same occasion, Jaya Prakash Malla sent a force under the command of Kaji Chikuti Maske and occupied the forts of Naldum and Mahadev Pokhari which resulted in a heavy loss for the Gorkhalis on both the forts. Meanwhile, the forces commanded by Tularam Pande occupied Dalachok fort and drove out the fort defenders of the Lalitpur Kingdom in 1754 A.D.

As a diplomat for the Gorkha Kingdom, Kaji Tularam held negotiations with the Pradhans of Dolakha and King of Kantipur (Kathmandu). In the letter of 1754 A.D. to Pradhans of Dolakha, King Prithvi Narayan of Gorkha demanded the surrender of Dolakha. He further added that his control has reached to East of Naldum and the inhabitants were assured of lives and property same like Palung, Tistung and Chitlang who had surrendered themselves without resistance. The King called on the notables of Dolakha to come over to his side, promising them protection if they did so and threatening to use force if they did not. In this matter, Kaji Tularam was deputed to hold negotiations with the Pradhans of Dolakha by King Prithvi Narayan. A treaty was signed at Dolalghat, and Dolakha was occupied without any fighting.

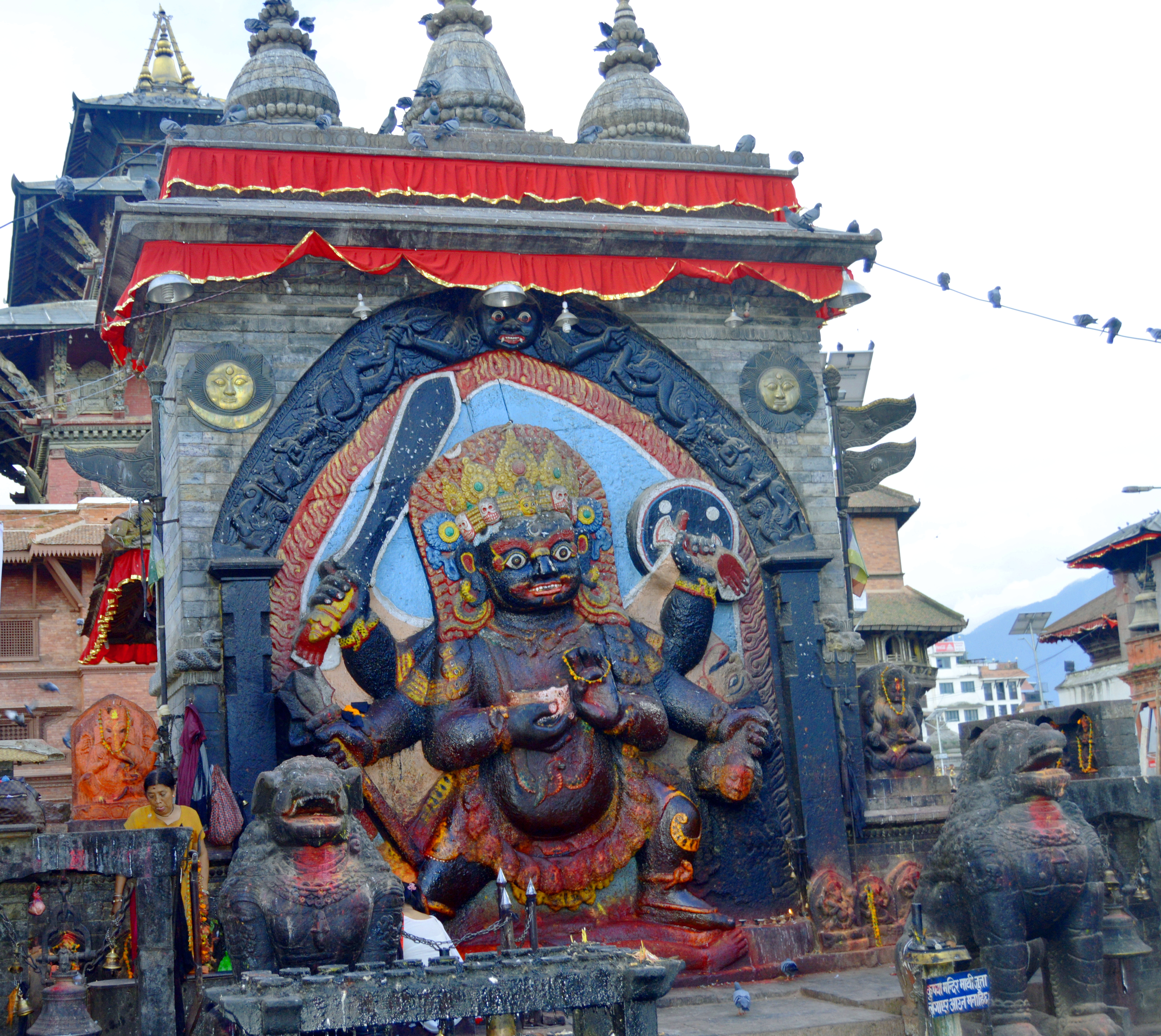
Statue of Kaal Bhairav deity at Hanuman Dhoka Darbar Square, the place where Kaji Tularam witnessed the sacrifice of his fellow diplomats to the deity

Kaji Tularam Pande led the diplomatic mission for concluding treaties with the Kings of Kathmandu Valley as deputed by Prithvi Narayan. This mission began after the King Prithvi Narayan was cautioned by the death of Kaji Kalu Pande in 1758 A.D. The actual motive of the mission was to increase the Gorkhali influence and persuade the nobilities of Kathmandu to align to Prithvi Narayan Shah. King Jaya Prakash Malla of Kantipur saw no possibility of trade and considered the mission as intrigue to spread Gorkhali influence. Subsequently, he imprisoned the members of the mission including Kaji Tularam and murdered two of them. Kaji Tularam was made to witness the sacrifice of his two fellow diplomats to the deity Kaal Bhairav. He was further taken to temple of guardian deity of Kantipur – Tulaja Bhawani and forcefully made to take solemn vow to support Kantipur against Gorkha in front of Goddess Tulaja Bhawani. He accepted the vow in coercion and was allowed to live. Momentarily, Kaji Tularam Pande managed to escape with the help of Kaji Kalidas of Patan. and reached Nuwakot on April 1759 to report the matter to Prithvi Narayan. The treatment of Gorkhalis by Jaya Prakash caused the treaty to be annulled and it further incensed Prithvi Narayan against Jaya Prakash.

After the defeat of Gorkhalis at Kirtipur in 1764 campaign, Jaya Prakash Malla sent the Nagarkoti troops led by Sardar Badhasingh Nagarkoti and eventually won over 2 outposts by surrounding the Naldum fort. After the Naldum victory, Jaya Prakash threatened that he would drive out the Gorkhalis from Nuwakot. Acknowledging the threat Prithvi Narayan Shah was advised by Vamsharaj Pande to attack Naldum overnight. Prithvi Narayan sent troops with command of Kaji Tularam Pande, Prabhu Malla and Harivamsha Upadhyaya through the northern section of Kathmandu at night. The Gorkhalis won the war and 450 soldiers, including Badhasingh of Nagarkoti troops and 45 Gorkhali soldiers were killed.

On 13th Ashwin 1825 B.S. (26 September 1768), the Gorkhali forces commanded by Vamsharaj Pande, Surapratap Shah and Tularam Pande launched the battle of Kathmandu and captured the royal palace in the night. The number of mortality on both sides was 20-25. The inhabitants of Kathmandu awoke the next morning only find that Prithvi Narayan Shah had become their King. A stream of people carrying presents went to the royal palace to greet their new King. Guns were fired to celebrate the occasion. In the course of the gunfire, gunpowder suddenly ignited, and, as a result, Tularam Pande was killed in that incident.

== Land grants ==
In the year 1821 Vikram Samvat, he received the Bandha Land Grants amounting NRs. 1101 from King Prithvi Narayan Shah.

== Patron of Gora Pandes ==
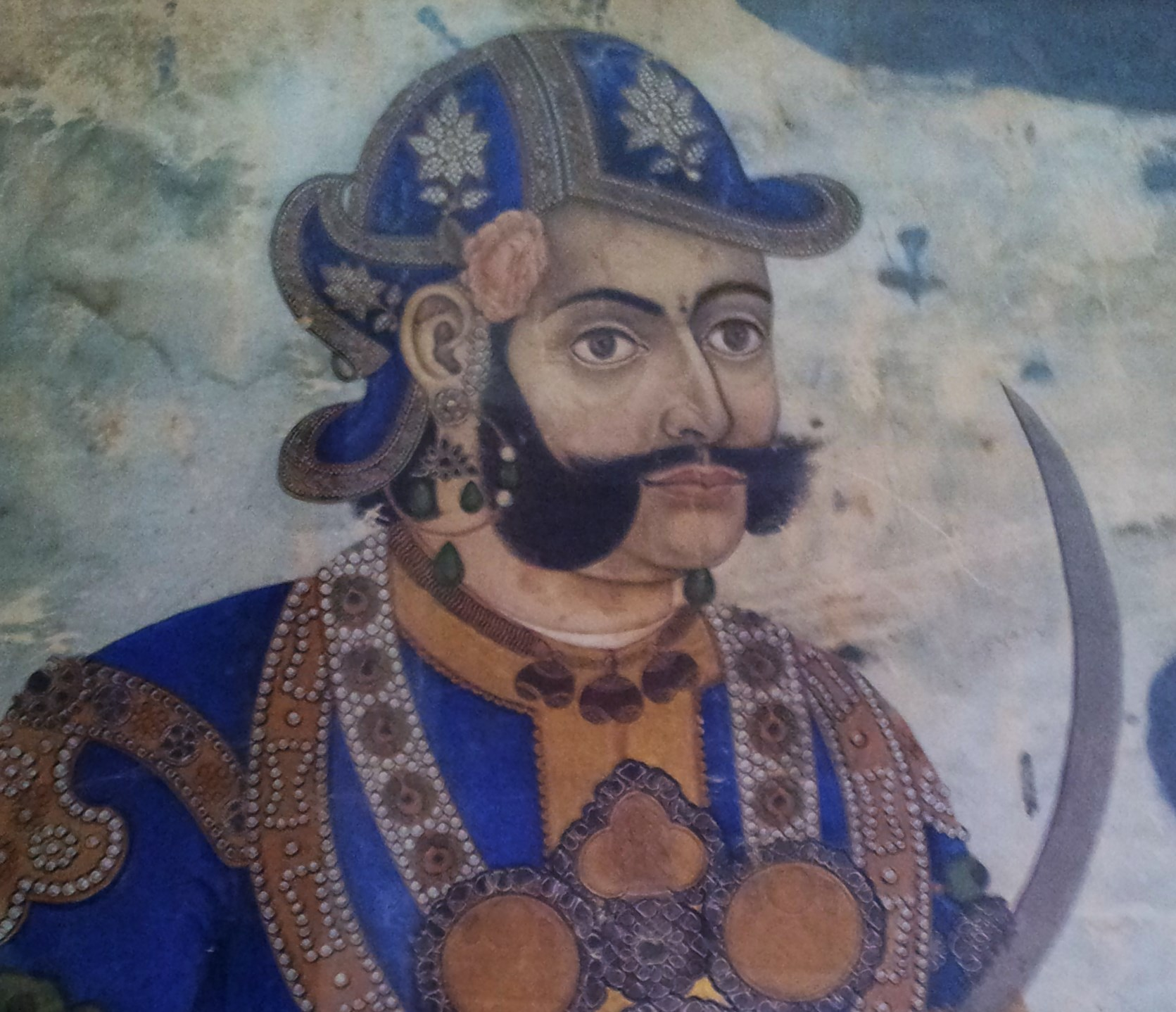
Mathabar Singh Thapa, a matrilineal descendant of Kaji Tularam

The descendants of Tularam Pande were called Gora Pandes and were a branch of the Gorkha based Pande family. The Pande genealogy mentions the name of Bhimaraj's son Vamshidhar as Kalu due to his dark complexion. Historian Baburam Acharya contends that Kalu Pande's sons and grandsons were probably of a dark complexion, hence Mathbar Singh derisively called them Kala Pandes (i.e. Black Pandes). Similarly, Mathbar Singh Thapa was son of the grand-daughter of Tularam Pande and called Tularam's descendants as Gora Pandes (i.e. White Pandes).

== Descendants ==
Tularam had five sons. The names of three of them are Jagajit Pande, Ranajit Pande and Bhotu Pande. Jagajit was the eldest and Ranajit was the second son. Dalabhanjan Pande was a grandson of Kaji Tularam through Sardar Jagajit. Dalabhanjan had brothers – Janga Bir, Birbhanjan and Singha Bir, all of whom reached the position of Kaji in their lifetime. Simhabir Pande, a son of Jagajit, was appointed Captain in Srinath Company on 1st Sudi Marga 1883 Vikram Samvat with a Khangi assignment consisted of 40 khets of rice land and khuwa revenue amounting to Rs 3,000.

His second son Ranajit Pande was appointed as Mulkaji of Nepal after the death penalty was given to Damodar Pande. Mulkaji Ranajit Pande had a daughter, Rana Kumari Pande, who was married to Kaji Nain Singh Thapa, through whom Mathabarsingh Thapa, Ganesh Kumari (mother of Jang Bahadur Rana). Ujir Singh Thapa, Queen Tripurasundari of Nepal were born. Due to these marital ties, this branch of Pandes did not suffer from the administration of Bhimsen Thapa and Mathabarsingh Thapa. His son Bhotu Pande was a military officer in the offence of the Sino-Nepalese War. He had also served as Kapardar in the royal palace. His statue with bearded appearance can be found in the building located south of Pashupatinath. His grandson Balabhanjan Pande, son of Bhotu, was appointed Sardar with a Khangi of 80 khets of rice land and a khuwa revenue of Rs 1,600. He was required to maintain 22 fusiliers and 1 piece of cannon. His Descendants Lt.General Rishi Kumar Pande who served as the Royal Palace Chief Military Secretary for King Birendra and Queen Aishwarya.

== Books ==
- Acharya, Baburam (1 August 1972a) [1966], "The Campaign Of Political Unification" (PDF), Regmi Research Series, 4 (8): 141–145
- Acharya, Baburam (1 October 1972b) [1966], "King Prithvi Narayan Shah's Military Campaigns, 1764-1767" (PDF), Regmi Research Series, 4 (10): 190–194
- Acharya, Baburam (1 February 1973a) [1972], "Chronology Of Events During King Prithvi Narayan Shah's Campaign Of Territorial Expansion" (PDF), Regmi Research Series, 5 (2): 21–27
- Acharya, Baburam (1 March 1973b), "Annexation of The Malla Kingdoms" (PDF), Regmi Research Series, 5 (3): 54–61
- Acharya, Baburam (1 March 1979), "The Unification of Nepal" (PDF), Regmi Research Series, 11 (3): 40–48
- Acharya, Baburam (2012), Acharya, Shri Krishna (ed.), Janaral Bhimsen Thapa : Yinko Utthan Tatha Pattan (in Nepali), Kathmandu: Education Book House, p. 228, ISBN 9789937241748
- Gyawali, Surya Bikram (1 January 1974) [1962], "Prithvi Narayan Shah's Conquest Of Nepal" (PDF), Regmi Research Series, 6 (1): 5–16
- Hamal, Lakshman B. (1995), Military history of Nepal, Sharda Pustak Mandir
- Karmacharya, Ganga (2005), Queens in Nepalese Politics: an account of roles of Nepalese queens in state affairs, 1775–1846, Nepal: Educational Publishing House, ISBN 978-999463393-7, archived from the original on 15 January 2023
- Nepal, Gyanmani (2007). Nepal ko Mahabharat (in Nepali) (3rd ed.). Kathmandu: Sajha. ISBN 9789993325857.
- Pradhan, Kumar L. (2012), Thapa Politics in Nepal: With Special Reference to Bhim Sen Thapa, 1806–1839, New Delhi: Concept Publishing Company, p. 278, ISBN 9788180698132
- D.R. Regmi (1975), Modern Nepal, vol. 1, Firma K.L. Mukhopadhyay, ISBN 0883864916
- D.R. Regmi (1961), Modern Nepal : Rise and Growth in the Eighteenth Century, vol. 1, Firma K.L. Mukhopadhyay
- Regmi, Mahesh Chandra (1995), Kings and political leaders of the Gorkhali Empire, 1768–1814, Orient Longman, ISBN 9788125005117
- Regmi, Mahesh Chandra (1987), "Bandha Land Grants" (PDF), Regmi Research Series, 19 (9–10): 126–131
- Regmi, Mahesh Chandra (1982), "Nature of Jagir Obligations" (PDF), Regmi Research Series, 14 (11): 171–174
- Shaha, Rishikesh (1990), Modern Nepal 1769–1885, Riverdale Company, ISBN 0-913215-64-3
- Shaha, Rishikesh (1982), Essays in the Practice of Government in Nepal, Manohar, p. 44, OCLC 9302577
- Singh, Mahendra Man (2013). Forever Incomplete: The Story of Nepal. SAGE Publishing India. ISBN 9788132118053.
- Singh, Nagendra Kr (1997). Nepal: Refugee to Ruler: A Militant Race of Nepal. APH Publishing. ISBN 9788170248477.
- Vajracharya, Dhanavajra; Shrestha, Tek Bahadur (1 January 1981) [1974], "The Political History of Dolakha" (PDF), Regmi Research Series, 13 (1): 12–16, 18–20
- Vajracharya, Dhanavajra; Nepal, Gyanmani (1 August 1970) [1957], "An Official Nepali account Of The Nepal-China War" (PDF), Regmi Research Series, 2 (8): 177–188
