= Battle of Lalitpur =

1768 battle

The Battle of Lalitpur
- Part of Unification of Nepal
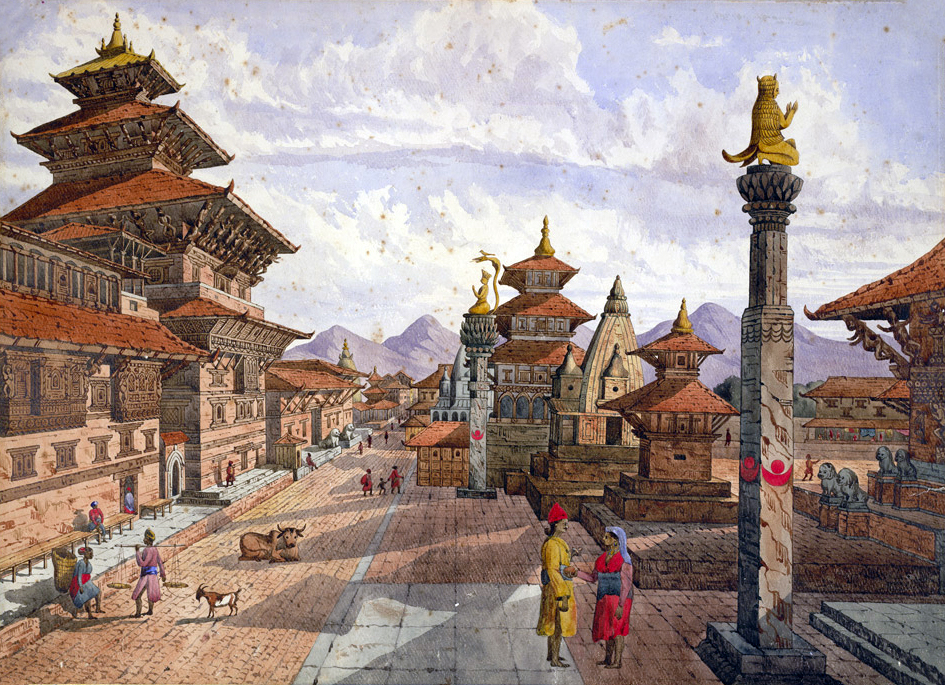
- Lalitpur Durbar Square, the royal palace complex, in 1855.
Date	1768
Location	Lalitpur
Result	Gorkhali victory

Belligerents
Kingdom of Lalitpur	Kingdom of Gorkha

Commanders and leaders
Tej Narasimha Malla; Six Pradhan Kajis; Kaji Dhanwanta Singh; Kaji Bhinkhyal Singh; Kaji Sinkhyal Singh; Kaji Chaku Bahal Singh; Kaji Kalidas Singh; Kaji Dhanjkaji Singh	Prithvi Narayan Shah; Vamsharaj Pande; Surpratap Shah

Strength
Unknown	20,000

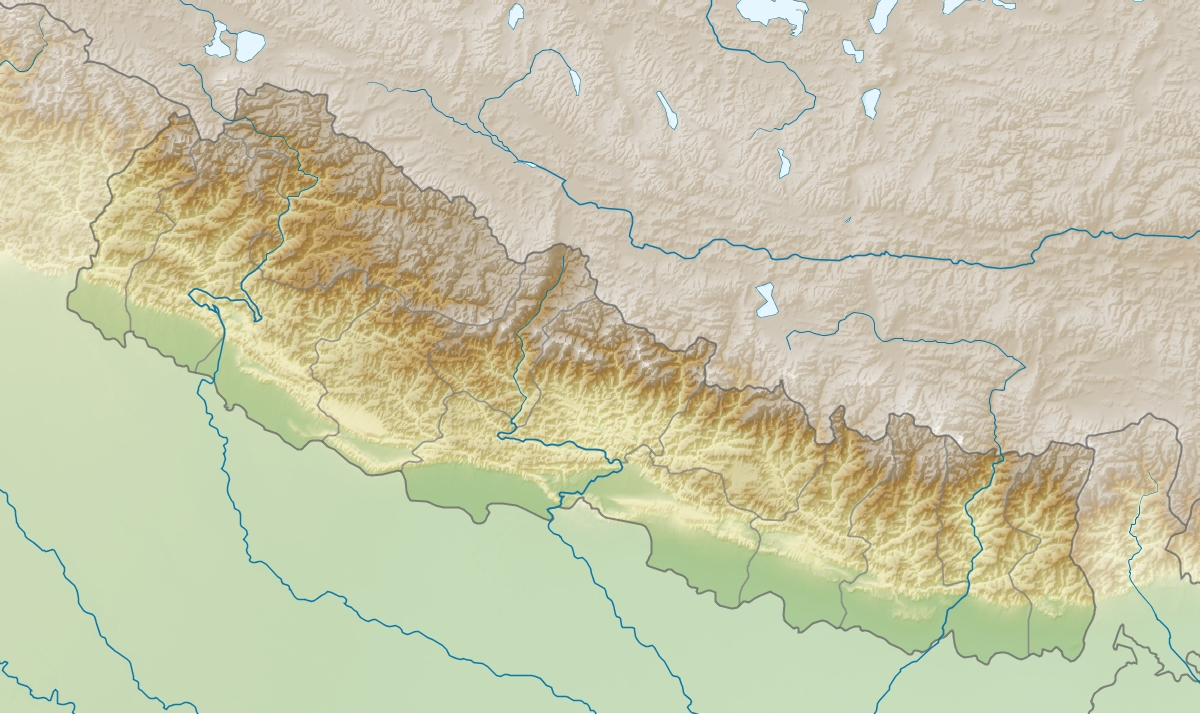
Location in present-day Nepal

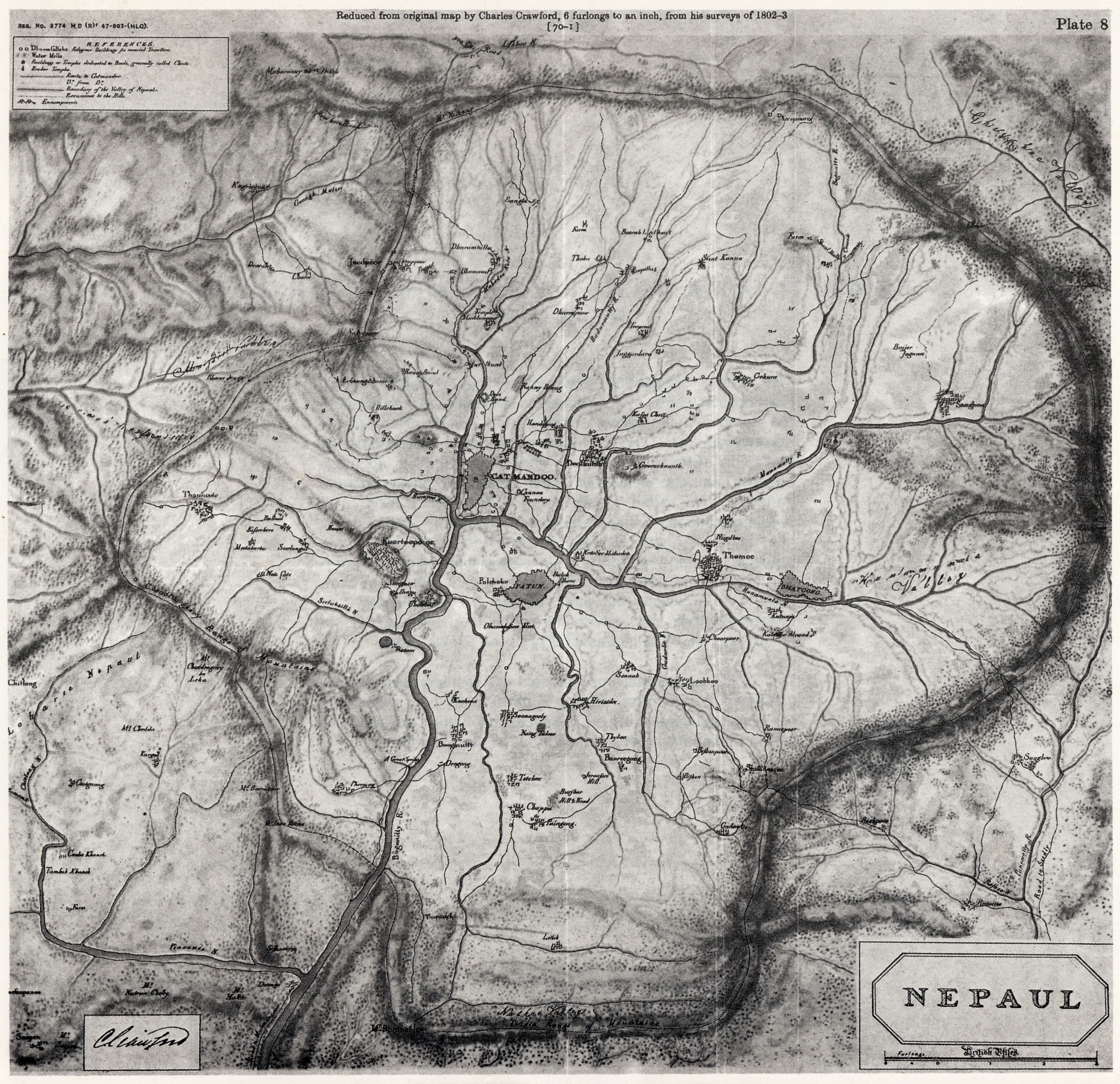
1802 map of Kathmandu Valley

The Battle of Lalitpur in 1768 ended with the Gorkha conquest of Lalitpur, one of the three kingdoms in Nepal centered in the Kathmandu Valley, and the loss of the rule of the native Newars.

Exhausted by a prolonged siege and much bloody fighting, the Newars surrendered when the Gorkhalis threatened to cut off their noses, like during the Battle of Kirtipur, and also their right arms.

The victors then entered the city and plundered it. They killed all the nobles and important men. They also dismantled the royal palace and looted the houses of the rich inhabitants and even the temples.

== Six Pradhans ==
Patan was ruled by the six bhardar/kshatriya noble Pradhan brothers - Kaji Dhanwanta Singh, Kaji Bhinkhyal Singh, Kaji Sinkhyal Singh, Kaji Chaku Bahal Singh, Kaji Kalidas Singh, Kaji Dhanjkaji Singh - who ruled as the de facto Lords (termed Kajis) of Patan who were very powerful. They were rather intelligent and sharp in politics and were collectively called the “Six Pradhans”. They had accumulated so much wealth and power that they even changed kings on their whim. In 1802 (date needs verification), after the death of Bishnu Malla, Rajya Prakash Malla was handed the throne of Patan by the Pradhans. The King of Gorkha, Prithivi Narayan Shan, defeated Nuwakot and started a blockade in the Valley. Seeing this, Rajya Prakash Malla wanted to develop good relationship with the King of Gorkha. But his efforts for this were not very successful. In the First Battle of Kirtipur in 1757, Prithivi Narayan Shah attacked Kritipur for the first time. In the war, Rajya Prakash Malla, with the help his brother Jaya Prakash Malla, the king of Kantipur, defeated the Gorkhalis. Rajya Praksah Malla had commanded his Army but the Six Pradhans did not want the King to conduct his work smoothly and efficiently, and a disagreement arose between them. In the events that followed, the Six Pradhans took out both eyes of the King. Following this, King Rajya Prakash Malla died in 1815 (date needs verification). On the very day of the king's death, the Pradhans crowned 18-year old Bishwojit Malla as the King of Patan. But even he could not rule as the King for more than 2 years. Genealogical records show that Kaji Kalidas Pradhans' son was married to Maiju Thakurni who was also taken up as his wife by king Bishwojit Malla. It is said the king was dragged out to the Taleju temple and decapitated by the Kaji's son. It was the rule at the time that a person could kill another if the latter took the former's wife as his own. As Bishwajit Malla was married to the wife of the Pradhan Kaji, and following that tradition, he was cut down by the Pradhan. There are also stories that the cunning Pradhans, who dominated and had power to change the King, may have had killed King Bishwojit under false pretenses.

Jaya Prakash Malla was very angry with the Pradhans for killing his brother. So in a bid to please him, the Pradhans wanted him to be crowned as the King of Patan. After Bishwojit's death, Jaya Prakash Malla was made the King of Patan in 1817 (date needs verification since he died in 1769). Due to his arrogance and merciless behaviour, the King and Pradhans were not in good terms. After ruling for one and half year, when Jaya Prakash Malla went to take a bath at Teku, the Pradhans made sure that the King would never return to Patan again banishing him away. The then King of Bhaktapur Ranajit Malla was handed the crown of Patan by the Pradhans. Ranajit Malla would also be thrown away from the throne by the Pradhans and Jaya Prakash Malla was reinstated as the King of Patan. Looking at the growing power of the Gorkhali king Prithvi Narayan Shah, the Pradhans wanted Shah to be the King of Patan. Seasoned in politics, Pritivi Narayan Shah was aware of the cunningness of the Pradhans and had his brother Dalmardan Shah crowned as Patan's king in 1763. In 1768, the Gorkhali invaded Kantipur. As a result, the Pradhans imprisoned Dalmardan Shah and they made Tej Narsingh Malla the king of Patan. Seeing Prithivi Narayan Shah conquer places one after another, the Pradhans were always on alert. One of the Pradhans, Kaji Dhanwanta, had already built a friendship with Prithivi Narayan Shah before defeating Kritipur.

In 1857 (date needs verification since he died in 1769), after the Gorkhalis won Kantipur, Jaya Prakash Malla sought asylum in Patan. The Pradhans wanted to surrender to Prithivi Narayan Shah. Seeing this, King Tej Narsingh Malla and Jaya Prakash Malla both then ran to Bhaktapur. After ruling for 25 years, showing their arbitrary governance, accumulating power, taking the norms, rules and laws in their hands: Patan's Pradhans had their existence ceased. Due to the way they ruled, historians often credit them for the collapse of the Malla dynasty.

== Blockade ==
Lalitpur (alternative names: Patan, Yala Desa यल देस, Lalit Pattan) was one of the three capitals in the Kathmandu Valley, the other two being Kathmandu and Bhaktapur. Lalitpur contained 24,000 houses, and its southern boundary extended to a distance of four days' journey to the kingdom of Makwanpur.

The Gorkhalis from the neighboring kingdom of Gorkha coveted the valley due to its rich culture, trade, industry and agriculture. In 1736, the Gorkhali king Nara Bhupal Shah launched an attack on Nuwakot, a border town and fort in the northwest of the valley, and was roundly defeated.

In 1742, his son Prithvi Narayan Shah became king and continued the quest. Shah sought to subdue the valley by choking its commerce and supply lines. His forces occupied strategic passes in the surrounding hills, and strangled the vital trade links with Tibet and India.

In 1744, Shah took Nuwakot which gave him a foothold in Nepal and allowed him to stop its trade with Tibet as it lay on the trans-Himalayan trade route. In 1762 and 1763, the Gorkhalis overran Makwanpur and Dhulikhel respectively, surrounding the Kathmandu Valley from the west, south and east.

In a bid to cause a famine, Shah prevented any grain from passing into the valley, and blockade runners were hung from the trees on the roads. The prolonged siege forced the king of Kathmandu to appeal to the British East India Company for help. In August 1767, Captain George Kinloch led a British force towards the valley to rescue its beleaguered inhabitants. He reached within 75 km of Kathmandu and captured the forts at Sindhuli and Hariharpur, but was forced to retreat after supplies ran out and his troops mutinied.

== Eyewitness account ==
An Italian Capuchin missionary, Father Giuseppe, Prefect of the Roman Mission, was an eyewitness to the Gorkhali invasion. He has written that after the defeat of Kirtipur, Shah sent his troops to attack Lalitpur. They surrounded half the city from the west, and began firing on it. Giuseppe's house was located near the city gate, and he moved to Kathmandu to get out of the line of fire.

== Take-over ==
Not being able to take Lalitpur even after a long siege and a series of fierce clashes, Shah decided to change his tactics. He sent his men to infiltrate the city's nobility and make a deal. He promised the nobles that they would be allowed to keep their property, in fact, they would get more if they accepted him as their king.

These secret negotiations convinced the Malla kings of Lalitpur and Kathmandu (who had sought refuge there after its capture by the Gorkhalis) that they were going to be betrayed, and they fled to Bhaktapur.

After Shah took Lalitpur, he treated the Pradhan nobles appreciatively for a time. Then one day he called them to a meeting at the riverbank of Teku Dobhan on the outskirts of the city. There, the Pradhan nobles were captured and killed.

The Gorkhalis then turned their attention towards Bhaktapur. The three Malla kings of Nepal were gathered at Bhaktapur Durbar Square to make a final stand against the aggressors. Shah conquered Bhaktapur in 1769, thus completing his conquest of Nepal. The Malla dynasty was replaced by the Shah dynasty which lasted until 2008 when Nepal became a republic.

== See also ==
- Battle of Kirtipur
- Battle of Kathmandu
- Battle of Bhaktapur
