= Battle of Kathmandu =

1768 siege in the Gorkhali conquest of Nepal

Coordinates: 27.7167°N 85.3667°E

Battle of Kathmandu/siege of Kathmandu
- Part of Unification of Nepal
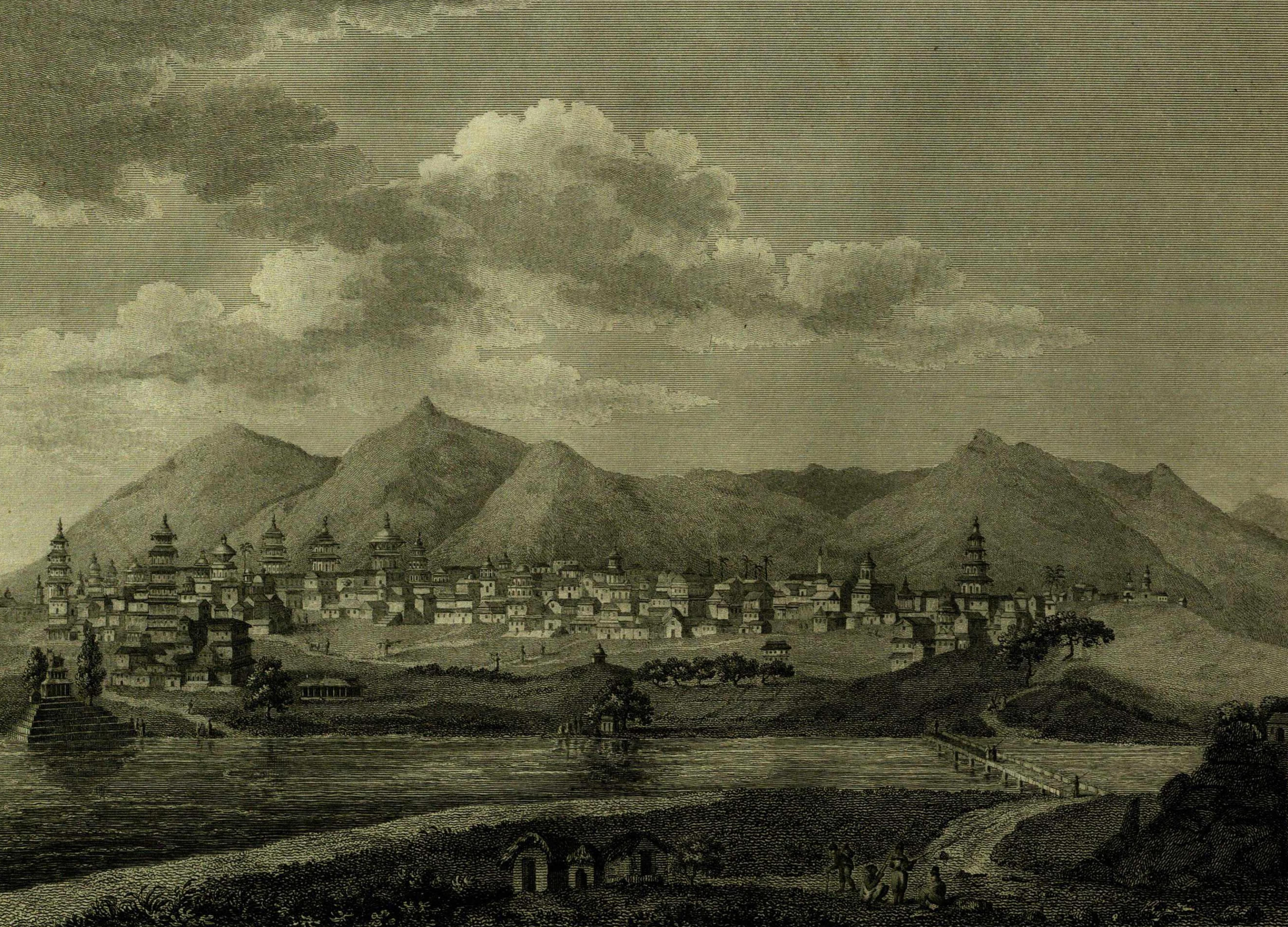
- Pagoda-studded skyline of Kathmandu in 1811
Date	26 September 1768
Location	Kathmandu
Result	Gorkhali victory
Territorial changes	Kathmandu Valley sieged and annexed by the Gorkhalis

Belligerents
Gorkha Kingdom	Kingdom of Kantipur; East India Company

Commanders and leaders
Prithvi Narayan Shah; Tularam Pande †; Vamsharaj Pande; Surapratap Shah	Jaya Prakash Malla and his nobles Captain Kinloch

Strength
18,000	7,000 800 soldiers of Commander Kinlockh

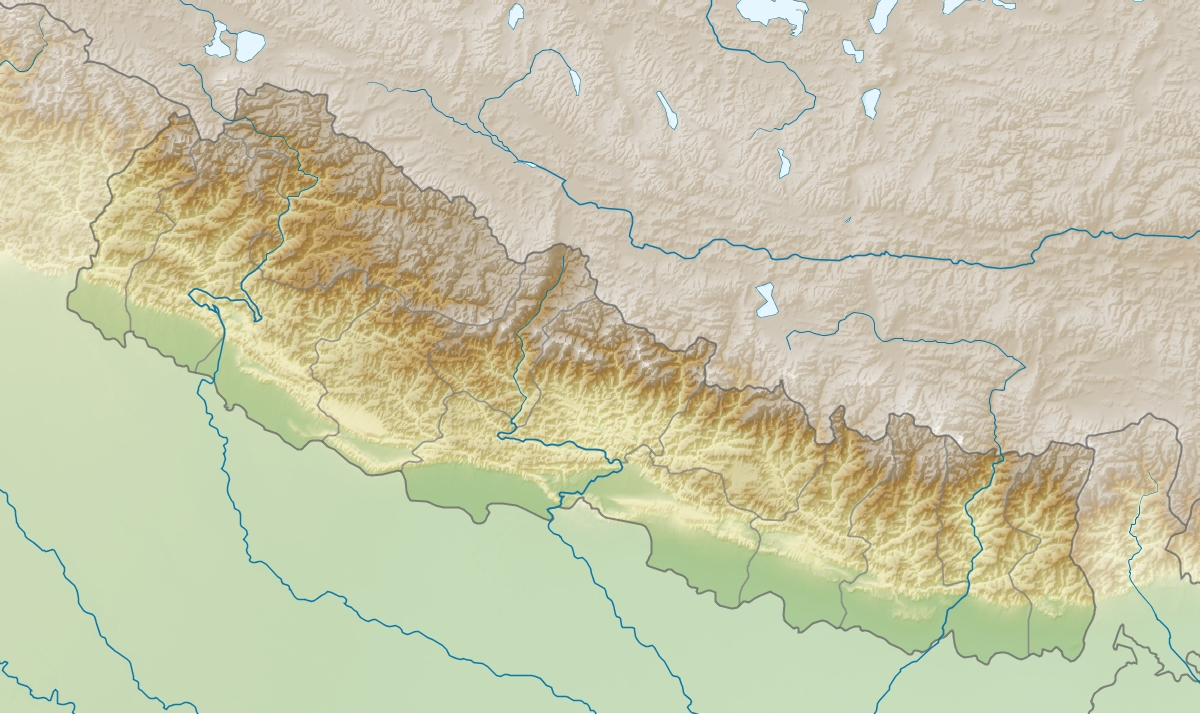
Location in present-day Nepal

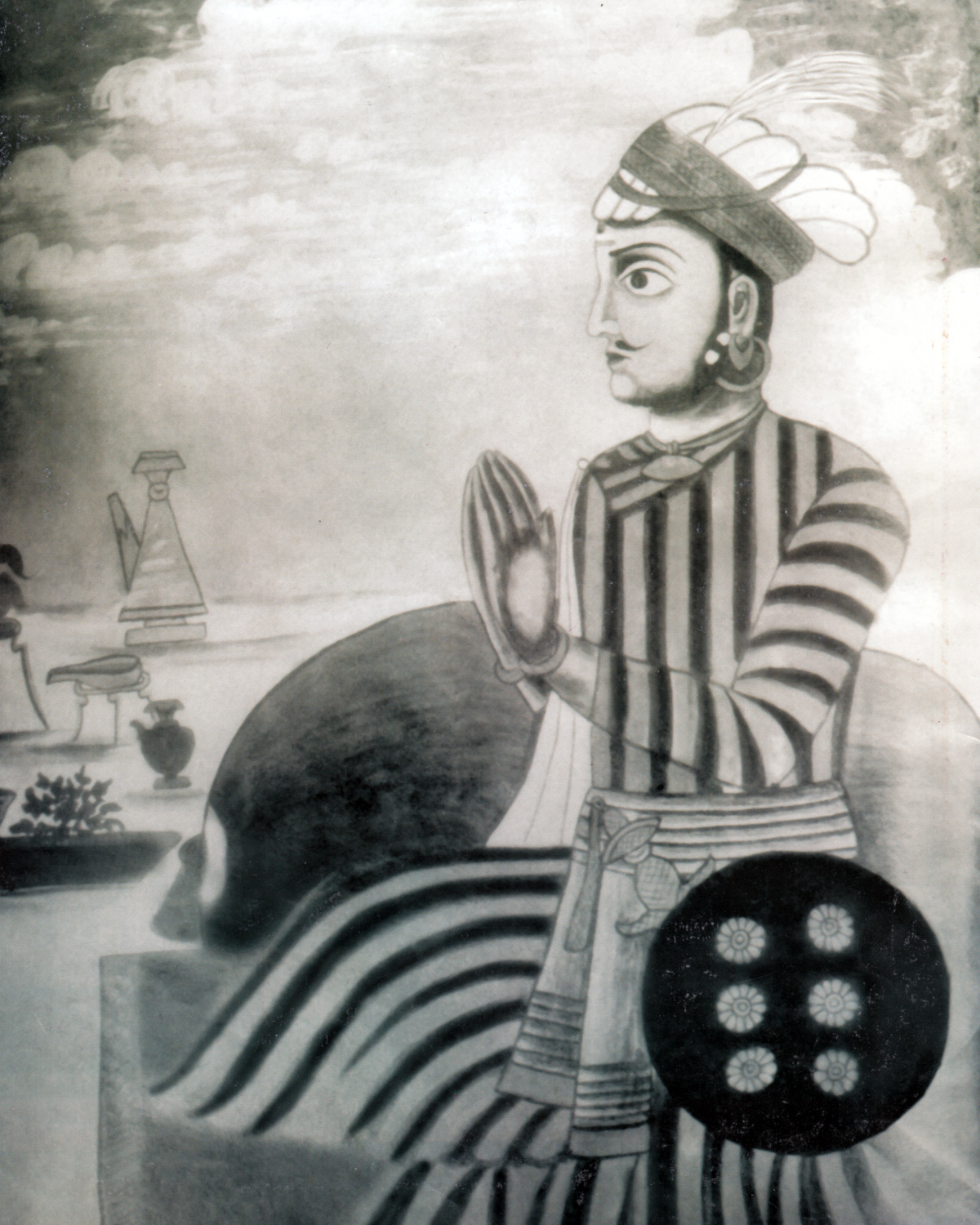
Jaya Prakash Malla (reigned 1736–1768), last king of Kathmandu

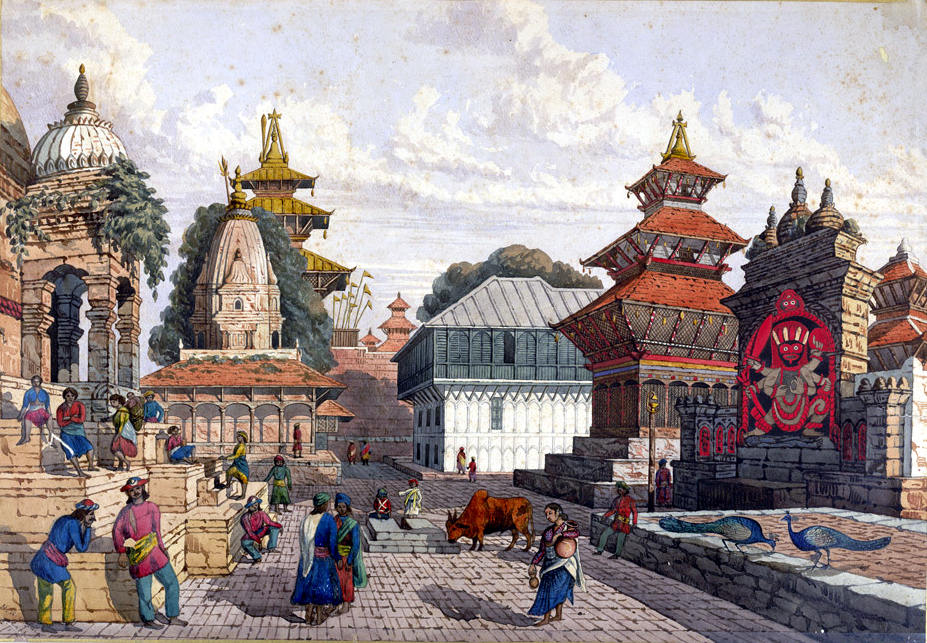
Kathmandu Durbar Square, where the main battle took place, as it looked in 1852

The Battle of Kathmandu (Nepali: काठमाडौंको युद्ध) or siege of Kathmandu or siege of Kantipur occurred during the Unification of Nepal. It was fought in Kathmandu in 1768, and resulted in the defeat of its king Jaya Prakash Malla by conquerors Prithvi Narayan Shah, king of the adjoining Gorkha Kingdom.

Shah's victory marked the establishment of the Shah dynasty in Nepal and the end of the rule of the indigenous Newars. The Newars, lost to the Gorkhalis who were expanding their kingdom.

== Blockade ==
Kathmandu (alternative names: Yen Desa येँ देस, Kantipur) was one of the three capital cities in the Kathmandu Valley, the other two being Lalitpur and Bhaktapur. The kingdom of Kathmandu extended to a distance of 12–13 days journey north to the Tibetan border. The Trishuli River marked the boundary between Kathmandu and Gorkha in the west.

The Gorkhalis desired the Kathmandu Valley due to its rich culture, trade, industry and agriculture. In 1736, the Gorkhali king Nara Bhupal Shah launched an attack on Nuwakot, a border town and fort in the northwest of the valley, and was roundly defeated.

His son Prithvi Narayan Shah became king in 1742 and resumed the campaign. Convinced he would not be able to take Kathmandu with strength, Shah sought to subdue the valley by choking its commerce and supply lines. His forces occupied strategic passes in the surrounding hills, and strangled the vital trade routes linking Tibet and India.

In 1744, he took Nuwakot, which gave him a foothold in Nepal and allowed him to stop its trade with Tibet as it lay on the trans-Himalayan trade route. In 1762 and 1763, the Gorkhalis overran Makwanpur and Dhulikhel respectively, surrounding the Kathmandu Valley from the west, south and east.

== British expedition ==
The prolonged siege forced the Malla king to appeal to the British East India Company for help against the invading Gorkhalis. News of incoming English assistance raised the spirits of the Newars.

In August 1767, Captain George Kinloch led a British force towards Kathmandu to rescue its beleaguered inhabitants. He reached within 75 km (47 mi) of Kathmandu and captured the forts at Sindhuli and Hariharpur, but was forced to retreat by a two-pronged attack from Kaji Vamsharaj Pande and Sardar Banshu Gurung. Captain Kinloch sent a message of his inability to reach Kathmandu which disheartened Jaya Prakash. However, the local traders saw the British failure as a relief due to the detrimental effect of British on the trade of Bihar and Bengal.

== Thamel capture ==
King Prithvi Narayan Shah began to assure support to locals of the outer reaches of the Kathmandu Valley. The local Newars of Kathmandu began to appreciate the liberal temperament and personality of Prithvi Narayan. Prithvi Narayan sent a message to Jaya Prakash asking him to surrender. However, Jaya Prakash began to hope the second British assault on Gorkhali forces.

On early September 1768, Prithvi Narayan began to analyze the strength of Kantipur forces. He captured the Thamel region which was outside the walled city of Kathmandu. Jaya Prakash did not resist the Gorkhali invasion of Thamel. People began to look upon Prithvi Narayan as the savior since he defeated the British forces who were detrimental to the agriculture, trade, and handicrafts. Meanwhile, Jaya Prakash was unpopular among the local Newars due to his lavish misuse of the wealth of temples. Finally, Jaya Prakash had only a few Maithil Brahmin citizens in his support as other inhabitants had changed their allegiance from Jaya Prakash to Prithvi Narayan.

== Invasion ==
With the siege of Kathmandu continuing, the Gorkhalis took Kirtipur in the Battle of Kirtipur in 1767. The fall of the hilltop town located to the west of Kathmandu, which was marked by bloody fighting and savagery, was a setback for the valley's defense.

On 13th Ashwin 1825 B.S. (26 September 1768), the Gorkhali forces commanded by Vamsharaj Pande, Surapratap Shah and Tularam Pande attacked Kathmandu and captured the royal palace in the night. They attacked from three points on its perimeter—Bhimsensthan, Naradevi and Tundikhel. At Bhimsensthan, Newar women stood at the windows of their houses and poured buckets of water laced with chili powder on the Gorkhali soldiers below. The men engaged the attackers in the street. After a brief battle, Jaya Prakash Malla realized that he had been betrayed by the nobles, and that Kathmandu was lost. He then fled to Lalitpur with his trusted troops. The number of mortality on both sides was 20–25. The inhabitants of Kathmandu awoke the next morning only to find that Prithvi Narayan Shah had become their King. A stream of people carrying presents went to the royal palace to great their new King. Guns were fired to celebrate the occasion. In the course of the gunfire, gunpowder suddenly ignited, and, as a result, Tularam Pande was killed.

In the following months, the Gorkhalis also conquered Lalitpur. The three kings of Nepal then gathered in Bhaktapur for a final stand against the aggressors. Shah conquered Bhaktapur in 1769, thus completing his conquest of Nepal. He established the Shah dynasty which remained until 2008 when Nepal became a republic.

== Comments on the invasion ==
Historian Baburam Acharya writes "None of the inhabitants of Kathmandu lost anything as a result of the occupation of their town by Prithvi Narayan Shah. In fact, the occupation of a capital by an army without bloodshed and plunder had few parallels in the history of the world." He further argues that:

Prithvi Narayan Shah had no imperialistic ambition. His sole aim was to unify Nepal. This explains why he did not treat Kathmandu as a vanquished city and plunder it. He not only reassured the people of Kathmandu through his amicable treatment, but also chose Kantipur as his capital.

— Annexation of Malla Kingdoms by Baburam Acharya

== See also ==
- Battle of Kirtipur
- Battle of Lalitpur
- Battle of Bhaktapur

== Books ==
- Acharya, Baburam (1 February 1973a) [1972], "Chronology Of Events During King Prithvi Narayan Shah's Campaign Of Territorial Expansion" (PDF), Regmi Research Series, 5 (2): 21–27
- Acharya, Baburam (1 March 1973b), "Annexation of The Malla Kingdoms" (PDF), Regmi Research Series, 5 (3): 54–61
