= Bhotu Pande =

Nepalese politician, military personnel and courtier in the Kingdom of Nepal

Kaji Shatrubhanjan "Bhotu" Pande
- श्री कपर्दार शत्रुभन्जन "भोटु" पाँडे

Personal details
- Born: 1763 AD
- Children: Balabhanjan
- Parent: Kaji Tularam Pande (father)
- Relatives: Tularam Pande (father); Damodar Pande (cousin); Ranajit Pande (brother)

Military service
- Allegiance: Kingdom of Nepal Nepal
- Branch/service: Nepal Army
- Rank: Kapardar
- Battles/wars: Sino-Nepalese War

Kapardar Bhotu Pande or Shatrubhanjan (Nepali: शत्रुभन्जन "भोटु" पाँडे) (born 1763) was a Nepalese politician, military personnel and courtier in the Kingdom of Nepal. He was member of the Gora Pande clan of Gorkha and the youngest son of Kaji Tularam Pande. Tularam had five sons. Three of them were Jagajit Pande, Ranajit Pande and Bhotu Pande.

== Ancestry ==
Kapardar Bhotu Pande installed an inscription on the Bishnumati bridge. The inscription explains his patrilineal relationship to Ganesh Pande, Minister of Drabya Shah, the first King of Gorkha Kingdom. The lineage mentions Ganesh Pande's son as Vishwadatta and Vishwadatta's son as Birudatta. Birudatta had two sons Baliram and Jagatloka. Bhotu Pande mentions Tularam, Baliram, and Birudatta respectively as his ancestors of three generations.

== Career ==
Bhotu Pande was a military officer in the offence of Sino-Nepalese War. He had served as a Kapardar in the royal palace. His statue with bearded appearance can be found in the building located south of Pashupatinath. His son Balabhanjan Pande, was appointed Sardar with a Khangi of 80 khets of rice-lands and a khuwa revenue of Rs 1,600. He was required to maintain 22 fusiliers and 1 piece of cannon.

== Bibliography ==
- Acharya, Baburam (March 1, 1979), "The Unification of Nepal" (PDF), Regmi Research Series, 11 (3): 40–48
- Pradhan, Kumar L. (2012), Thapa Politics in Nepal: With Special Reference to Bhim Sen Thapa, 1806–1839, New Delhi: Concept Publishing Company, p. 278, ISBN 9788180698132
- Regmi, Mahesh Chandra (1982), "Nature of Jagir Obligations" (PDF), Regmi Research Series, 14 (11): 171–174
- Vajracharya, Dhanavajra; Nepal, Gyanmani (August 1, 1970) [1957], "An Official Nepali account Of The Nepal-China War" (PDF), Regmi Research Series, 2 (8): 177–188, archived from the original (PDF) on October 28, 2020
