= Battle of Kirtipur =

1767 battle in Nepal

The Battle of Kirtipur
- Part of Unification of Nepal
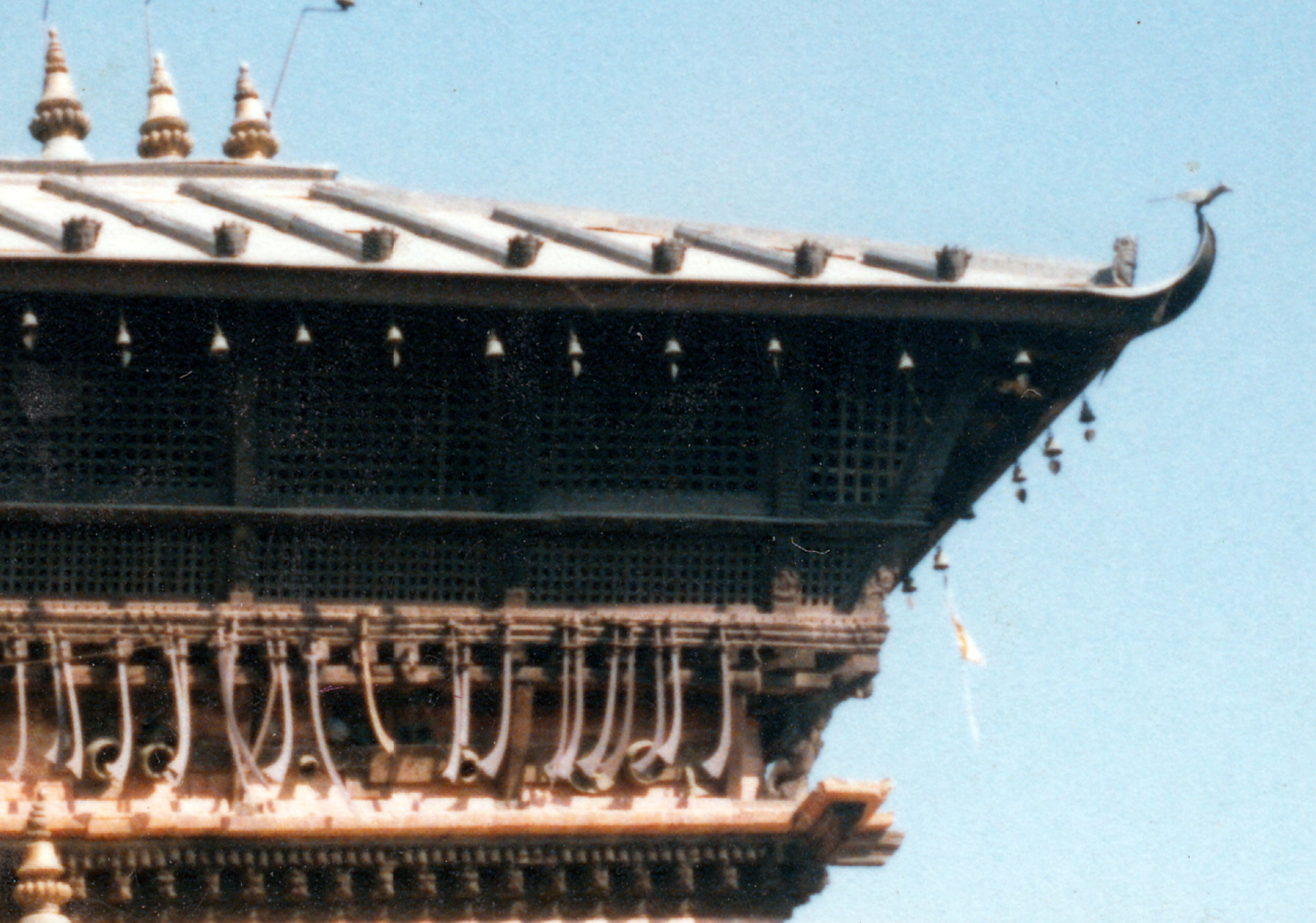
- Swords from Battle of Kirtipur on Bagh Bhairava Temple
Date	1767
Location	Kirtipur
Result	Gorkhali victory

Belligerents
Kingdom of Lalitpur	Gorkha Kingdom

Commanders and leaders
Kaji Danuwanta Pradhan; King Gyan Praja Malla; Queen Kirti Laxmi Pradhan (Malla)	Kalu Pande †; Sura Pratap Shah; Dal Mardan Shah; Tularam Pande; Birbhadra Thapa; Daljit Shah; Abhiman Singh Basnet; Vamsharaj Pande

Strength
3000(early stages)-8000(later stages)	1200(20,000 in the later stages)

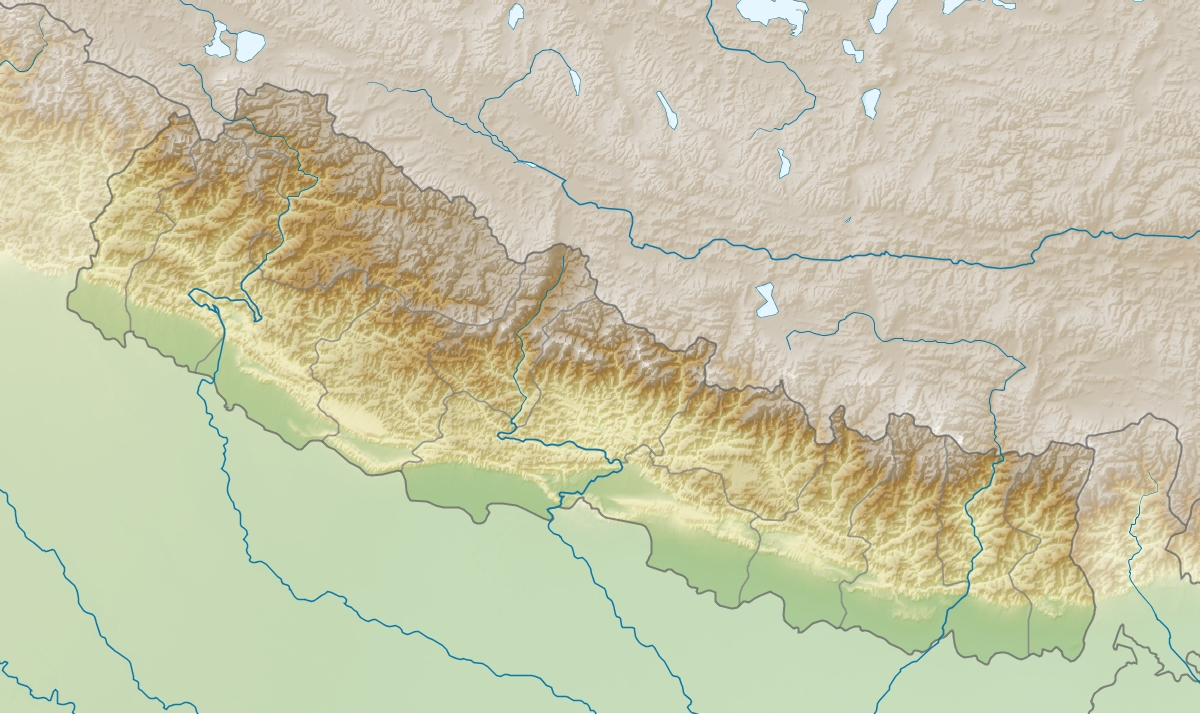
Location in present-day Nepal

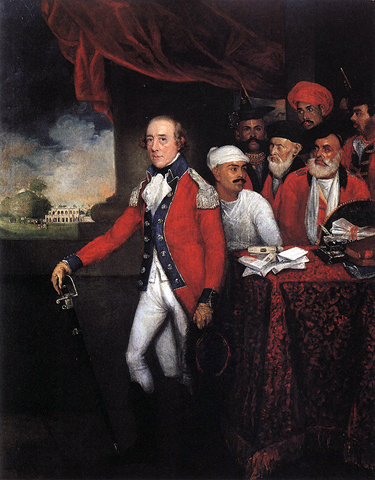
Col. Kirkpatrick visited Nepal in 1793 and saw noseless veterans of the battle.

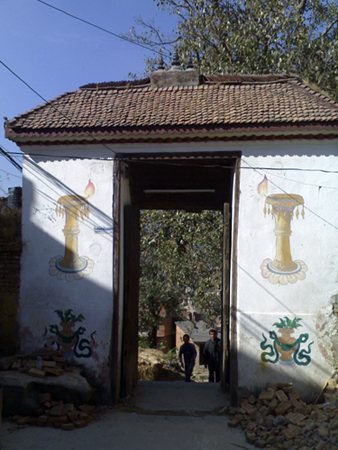
One of the city gates through which the Gorkhalis entered Kirtipur.

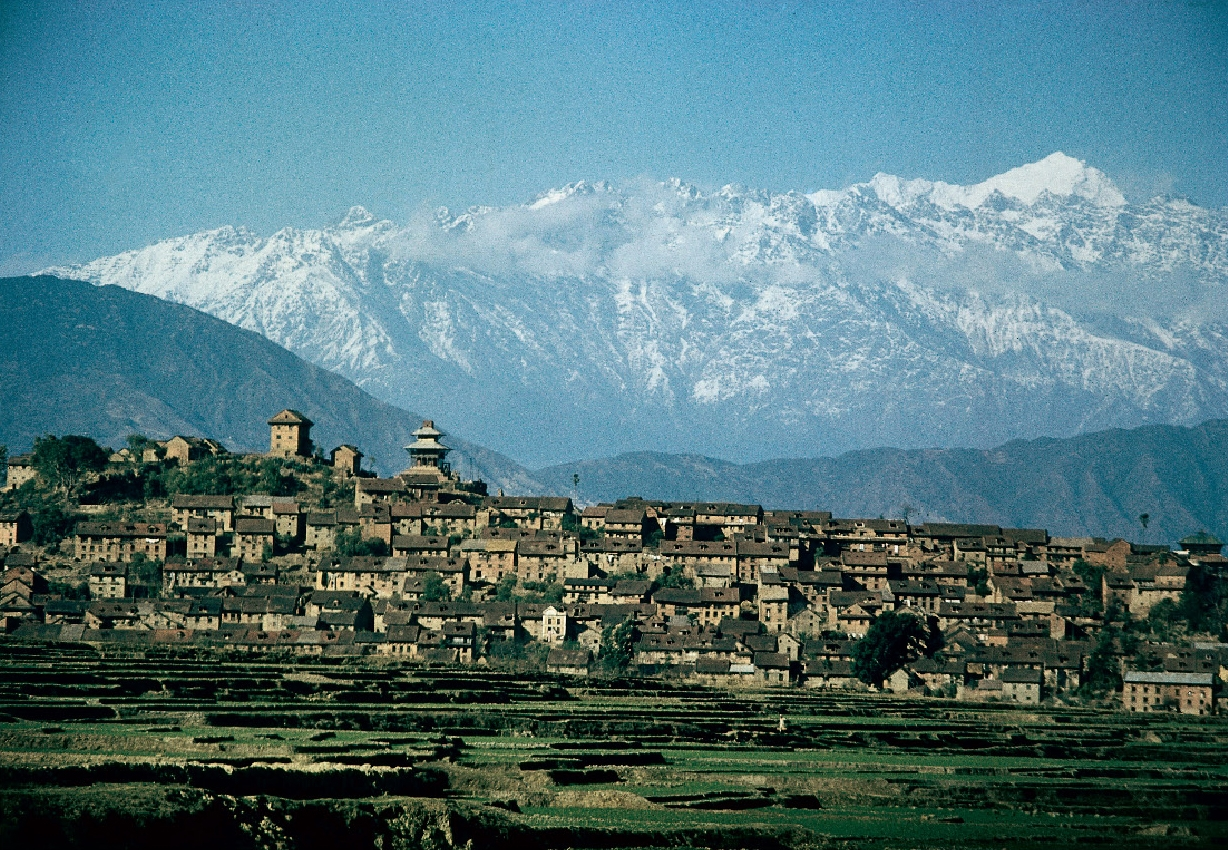
Kirtipur with the Himalaya in the background.

The Battle of Kirtipur (Nepal bhasa : कीर्तिपुरयाउ युद्ध) occurred in 1767 during the Gorkha conquest of Nepal, and was fought at Kirtipur, one of the principal towns in the Kathmandu Valley. Kirtipur was then a walled town of 800 houses and part of the kingdom of Lalitpur. It is spread along the top of a ridge.

The battle between the Newars of the valley and the invading Gorkhalis marked a turning point in the war of expansion launched by Gorkhali king Prithvi Narayan Shah. It led to his subjugation of the rest of the coveted valley and the end of Newar rule.

== Blockade ==
The Gorkhalis desired the Kathmandu Valley due to its rich culture, trade, industry and agriculture. In 1736, the Gorkhali king Nara Bhupal Shah launched an attack on Nuwakot, a border town and fort in the northwest of the valley, to probe its defences. His troops were badly defeated.

His son Prithvi Narayan Shah became king in 1742 and resumed the campaign. Convinced he would not be able to take Kathmandu with strength alone, Shah sought to subdue the valley by choking its commerce and supply lines. His forces occupied strategic passes in the surrounding hills, and strangled the vital trade links with Tibet and India.

In 1744, he took Nuwakot, which gave him a foothold in Nepal and allowed him to stop its trade with Tibet as it lay on the trans-Himalayan trade route. In 1762 and 1763, the Gorkhalis overran Makwanpur and Dhulikhel respectively, surrounding the Kathmandu Valley from the west, south and east.

In a bid to cause a famine, he mounted a blockade preventing any grain from passing into the valley. Blockade runners were hung from the trees on the roads. The prolonged siege forced the king of Kathmandu to appeal to the British East India Company for help. In August 1767, Captain George Kinloch led a British force towards the valley to rescue its beleaguered inhabitants. He reached within 75 km of Kathmandu and captured the forts at Sindhuli and Hariharpur, but the Gorkhalis attacked them on their way and the Party retreated to Bettiah.

== First assault ==
The Gorkhalis had set up a base on Dahachok, a hill on the valley's western rim, from where they mounted their assaults on Kirtipur. They were armed with swords, bows and arrows and muskets.

During the first assault in 1757, the Gorkhali army was badly beaten. As they advanced towards Kirtipur, the people went to meet them under the command of Kaji Danuvanta. The two armies fought on the plain of Tyangla Phant in the north-west of Kirtipur. The Newars defended their town ferociously. The hill which Kirtipur was on acted like a natural defensive barrier. The Newars threw rocks and boulders causing heavy casualties which ended up in 400 Gorkhali casualties and 800 Newar casualties. The Gorkhali commander Kalu Pande was killed, and the Gorkhali king himself barely escaped with his life into the surrounding hills disguised as a saint. After the battle Jaya Prakash the kantipurian king beheaded Kalu Pandes body and put it on a pike and paraded around the city of Kirtipur. After the battle diplomacy came Jaya Prakash told Prthivi Narayan that the Kathmandu Valley can trade on the route of Dolakha or else new attacks and skirmishes would happen which Prithivi Narayan agreed.

== Second assault ==
Having no hope of taking Kirtipur by force, Shah mounted a blockade in an effort to starve the population into submission. The embargo was enforced by putting to death anybody found on the road with salt or cotton. But the Newars held out.

In 1764, Shah ordered his troops to storm the town a second time. The Gorkhalis attacked at night under the command of Shah's brother Surpratap (alternative name: Surpratap). The people of Kirtipur beat off the Gorkhalis again, raining stones on the invaders from the town walls. In the fighting, Surpratap was struck by an arrow in the eye, losing that eye. Alternative story tells that after the battle of makwanpur with new courage and confidence Prithivi Narayan attacked Kirtipur. During the battle the kirtipurians closed the gates of Kirtipur which during those time in Nepal opening the gates of a fort or town was seen as brave and courageous, but Surpratap halted the attack and after 1–2 hours with more reinforcements and ladders the Gorkhalis attacked again. The Newars threw stones to the climbing Gorkhalis which caused minor casualties as the Gorkhalis just waited out the attack. After, the short Newari offensive the Gorkhalis managed to take a tower and a section of the wall but in the attack Surpratap was shot in the eye with an arrow, this caused the spirits of the Gorkhalis to fall and their formation to break no matter how much he tried Surpratap didn't manage to reorganize his troops and the Newars counterattacked causing 400 Gorkhali casualties and about 600-1000 Newari casualties

== Third assault ==
In 1767, the king of Gorkha sent his army to attack Kirtipur a third time under the command of Surpratap. In response, the three kings of Malla Confederacy joined forces and sent their troops to the relief of Kirtipur, but they could not dislodge the Gorkhalis from their positions. A noble of Lalitpur named Danuvanta crossed over to Shah's side and treacherously let the Gorkhalis into the town.

After the surrender of the town, Shah ordered the ears and noses of the inhabitants cut off. This incident is reported in eyewitness accounts by Capuchin monks and corroborated in at least two Nepali sources. According to historian John Whelpton, the Capuchins had reason to dislike Shah, but it is unlikely that they fabricated the account of this incident.

== See also ==
- Battle of Kathmandu
- Battle of Lalitpur
- Battle of Bhaktapur
