= Surpratap Shah =

- Prince of Gorkha
- Born: Gorkha Kingdom
- Died: Nepal
- Nepali: सूर्यप्रताप शाह
- Dynasty: Shah dynasty
- Father: Nara Bhupal Shah
- Religion: Hinduism

Surapratap Shah (Nepali: सुरप्रताप शाह) or Surya Pratap Shah (Nepali: सूर्यप्रताप शाह) was a prince of the Gorkha Kingdom. He was active during the battles referred to as the Unification of Nepal led by his brother, King Prithvi Narayan Shah.

He participated in the Battle of Kirtipur and the Battle of Makwanpur. He commanded the Battle of Kirtipur, where he lost his left eye, which led people to call him "a blind man".

Shah also held the title of Kaji. In the early 1970s, Shah went into exile in the Tanahun Kingdom, after Prithvi Narayan Shah and Surpratap had quarreled. This led to Prithvi Narayan Shah invading Tanahun.

Kirtipur War Memorial Park, an under-construction park, is set to depict the Battle of Kirtipur, and it is planned to show Surpratap Shah being struck by an arrow.
