= Ranajit Pande =

Nepalese politician and military commander

Shree Mulkaji Saheb Ranajit Pande
- श्री मूलकाजी साहेब रणजीत पाँडे

Mulkazi (Chief Kazi) of Nepal
- In office 1804 A.D.
- Monarch: Girvan Yuddha Bikram Shah
- Prime Minister: Rana Bahadur Shah as Mukhtiyar
- Preceded by: Damodar Pande
- Succeeded by: Bhimsen Thapa as Mukhtiyar

Military service
- Allegiance: Nepal
- Battles/wars: Sino-Nepalese War

Ranajit Pande (Nepali: रणजीत पाँडे) was a Nepalese politician, military personnel and courtier in the Kingdom of Nepal. He was a member of the Gora Pande clan of Gorkha. He became Mulkaji of Nepal for a brief period in 1804 A.D.

== Family ==
He was born as the second son of Tularam Pande on 1809 Vikram Samvat (1752 A.D.). His ancestors as per the inscription installed by his brother Kapardar Bhotu Pande shows Tularam, Baliram and Birudatta in the three generations.

=== Relation with Thapas ===
He had a daughter Rana Kumari Pande who was married to Thapa Kaji Nain Singh Thapa. Their children were Mathabarsingh Thapa, Ganesh Kumari (mother of Jang Bahadur Rana, Queen Tripurasundari of Nepal and Colonel Ujir Singh Thapa.

Nain Singh Thapa	Rana Kumari Pande
Ganesh Kumari*	Queen Tripurasundari of Nepal (born 1794)	Ujir Singh Thapa (born 1796)	Mathabarsingh Thapa (born 1798)
Ranojjwal Singh Thapa	Bikram Singh Thapa	Amar Singh Thapa II

- Ganesh Kumari is mother of Jung Bahadur Rana, founder of Rana dynasty.

== Career ==
=== Sino Nepalese war ===
He also fought in the Sino-Nepalese War as subordinate commander under Chautariya Kaji Krishna Shah.

=== As a Mulkaji of Nepal ===
After the execution of Mulkazi Prime Minister Damodar Pande, Ranajit who was a paternal cousin of Damodar, was established as Mulkaji (Chief Kazi) along with Bhimsen Thapa as second Kazi, Sher Bahadur Shah as Mul Chautariya and Ranganath Paudel as Raj Guru (Royal Preceptor). Though he was made Mulkaji but the apex power of executive functions of the state was carried out by Rana Bahadur Shah who assumed the title of Mukhtiyar (Chief Authority).
