= Mulkaji =

Equivalent to the Prime Minister in Nepal, from 1785 to 1804

Mulkaji of Kingdom of Nepal नेपाल अधिराज्यको मूलकाजी
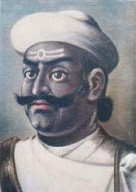
- one of the influential Mulkaji Damodar Pande
- Style: Sri Mulkaji; Mulkaji Saheb
- Residence: various
- Seat: Hanuman Dhoka Palace
- Appointer: King of Nepal
- Precursor: Bamsa Raj Pande (as Dewan Kaji of Nepal)
- Formation: circa 1785
- First holder: Abhiman Singh Basnyat
- Final holder: Ranajit Pande
- Abolished: 1804
- Succession: Rana Bahadur Shah (as Mukhtiyar of Nepal)

Mulkaji (Nepali: मूलकाजी) was the position of head of executive of Kingdom of Nepal in the late 18th and early 19th centuries. It was equivalent to Prime Minister of Nepal. There were 8 Mulkajis appointed between 1785 and 1804.

== Meaning ==
Mulkaji is formed from two words: Mul and Kaji. Mul means Chief, Key or Fundamental and Kaji is derived from Sanskrit word Karyi which meant functionary. Altogether it means Chief Functionary or Executive Head of the State.

== History of the Mulkajis ==
=== Abhiman Singh Basnyat ===
Dewan Kaji Bamsa Raj Pande was beheaded in March 1785 on the conspiracy of Queen Rajendra Laxmi with the help of supporters including senior Kaji Swaroop Singh Karki. On 2 July 1785, Prince Regent Bahadur Shah of Nepal was arrested and on the eleventh day of imprisonment on 13 July, Queen Rajendra Laxmi died. Then onwards, Bahadur Shah of Nepal took over the regency of his nephew King Rana Bahadur Shah and the position of Chautariya while Abhiman Singh Basnyat was elected Mulkaji (Chief Kaji).

=== Kirtiman Singh Basnyat ===
In 1794, King Rana Bahadur Shah came of age and appointed Kirtiman Singh Basnyat as Chief (Mul) Kaji among the newly appointed four Kajis though Damodar Pande was the most influential Kaji. Kirtiman had succeeded Abhiman Singh Basnyat as Chief Kaji.

=== Bakhtawar Singh Basnyat ===
Kirtiman was secretly assassinated on 28 September 1801, by the supporters of Raj Rajeshwari Devi and his brother Bakhtawar Singh Basnyat, was then given the post of Chief (Mul) Kaji.

=== Damodar Pande ===
Later Damodar Pande was appointed by Queen Rajrajeshwari as Chief Kaji.

=== Ranajit Pande ===
After the execution of Mulkaji Damodar Pande in March 1804, Ranajit Pande was appointed as Mulkaji (Chief Kaji) along with Bhimsen Thapa as second Kaji, Sher Bahadur Shah as Mul Chautariya and Ranganath Paudel as Raj Guru (Royal Preceptor).

Later King Rana Bahadur Shah created the title of Mukhtiyar and assume full executive power of the state.

== List of Mulkajis of Kingdom of Nepal ==
No.	Portrait	Name (Birth–Death)	Term of office		Political party
No.	Portrait	Name (Birth–Death)	Took office	Left office	Political party
1		Abhiman Singh Basnyat (1744–1800)	1785	1794	Independent
2		Kirtiman Singh Basnyat (??–1801)	1794	28 September 1801	Independent
3		Bakhtawar Singh Basnyat	1801	February 1803	Independent
4		Damodar Pande (1752–1804)	February 1803	March 1804	Independent
5		Ranajit Pande	1804	1804	Independent

== Controversial Mulkaji ==
Historian Dilli Raman Regmi asserts that Sarbajit Rana Magar was chosen as Chief Functionary. Historian Rishikesh Shah asserts that Sarbajit was appointed only a Kaji and was the head of the Nepalese government for a short period in 1778.

== See also ==
- Government of Nepal
- History of Nepal

== Bibliography ==
- Acharya, Baburam (2012), Acharya, Shri Krishna (ed.), Janaral Bhimsen Thapa : Yinko Utthan Tatha Pattan (in Nepali), Kathmandu: Education Book House, p. 228, ISBN 9789937241748
- Joshi, Bhuwan Lal; Rose, Leo E. (1966), Democratic Innovations in Nepal: A Case Study of Political Acculturation, University of California Press, p. 551
- Karmacharya, Ganga (2005), Queens in Nepalese Politics: an account of roles of Nepalese queens in state affairs, 1775-1846, Nepal: Educational Publishing House, ISBN 9789994633937
- Nepal, Gyanmani (2007), Nepal ko Mahabharat (in Nepali) (3rd ed.), Kathmandu: Sajha, p. 314, ISBN 9789993325857
- Pradhan, Kumar L. (2012), Thapa Politics in Nepal: With Special Reference to Bhim Sen Thapa, 1806–1839, New Delhi: Concept Publishing Company, p. 278, ISBN 9788180698132
- Regmi, Mahesh Chandra (1979). "Regmi Research Series". Nepal.
- Shaha, Rishikesh (2001), An introduction to Nepal, Kathmandu: Ratna Pustak Bhandar
