= Baburam Acharya =

Nepalese historian (1888–1971 AD)

इतिहास शिरोमणि बाबुराम आचार्य
- बाबुराम आचार्य
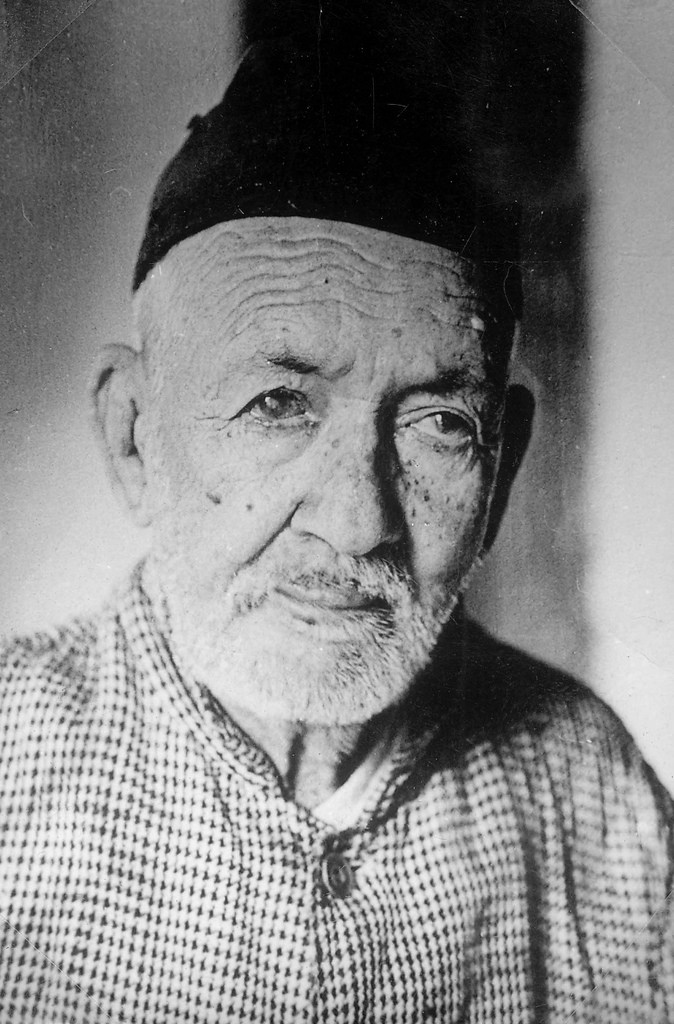
- Baburam Acharya at his old age
- Born: 1888
- Died: 1971 (aged 82–83)

Baburam Acharya (Nepali: बाबुराम आचार्य) (1888–1971 AD) was a Nepalese historian and literary scholar. He is known as the historian laureate (इतिहास शिरोमणि) of Nepal. The four part biography of King Prithivi Narayan Shah, founder of Modern Nepal is a key series of work he created. He is known for the study of ancient Nepalese inscriptions.

== Sagarmatha ==
Baburam Acharya is widely credited with bringing the Nepali name Sagarmatha (सगरमाथा) for Mount Everest into wider official and public use. The attribution is more accurately described as the discovery and popularization of an existing name rather than the invention of a completely new name. In an essay published in the Nepali literary journal Sharada in the late 1930s, Acharya discussed the names used for the world's highest mountain and stated that the name Sagarmatha was already known in the region. He later emphasized that he had "discovered" the name rather than coined it. The episode subsequently became an important part of his public legacy.

In his own words:

In the map of Nepal published by the then Survey of India Office, the name of the tallest peak of the Himalayan Mountain range was written as Mount Everest. In the map's second edition, the peak had two names: Mount Everest and the Tibetan name Chomolongma; but there was no Nepalese name. With a view to providing a Nepalese name, especially for the map, an investigative essay entitled as Sagarmatha or Jhomolongma was published in the Sharada, a Nepalese-language monthly.

The publication initially attracted opposition from the Rana government, and Acharya later recalled that he had been accused of insulting the British by proposing a Nepali name for a mountain already known internationally as Mount Everest. The Nepali government subsequently adopted Sagarmatha as the official Nepali name. The history of the name is therefore more complex than the often-repeated claim that Acharya simply "named" Everest: his own account presented him as documenting and promoting a name that he believed was already in use.

== Historical scholarship ==
Acharya was one of the major figures in the development of modern Nepalese historiography. His research drew on indigenous written records, royal documents, inscriptions and oral traditions, and he attempted to reconstruct Nepal's political history from sources that had previously received comparatively limited systematic study. His proximity to the Shah and Rana ruling families also gave him access to rare family records and oral accounts. Scholars have noted that this access was an important strength of his work, while also making his relationship with the political establishment an important consideration when assessing his historical interpretations.

Among his best-known works are the multi-volume biography of Prithvi Narayan Shah, studies of Bhimsen Thapa and Rana Bahadur Shah, and his writings on Nepal's relations with Tibet and China. His A Short History of Nepal was based on work he dictated between 1949 and 1951 and covered Nepal's history to the reign of Girvan Yuddha Bikram Shah. His writings were subsequently published and translated in the Regmi Research Series, helping make his historical research available to a wider scholarly audience.

== Publications ==
- The Bloodstained Throne: Struggles for Power in Nepal (1775–1914)
- Chin, Tibet ra Nepal
- Purana Kavi ra Kabita
- General Bhimsen Thapa: Yinko Utthan ra Patan
- Nepalko Sanskritic Parampara
- Hamro Rastrabhasa Nepali
- Shree Panch Pratapsingh Shah
- Prachinkaalko Nepal
- Nepalko Samchhipta Britanta
- Shree Panch Prithvi Narayan Shah ko Samchhipta Jeewani
- Baburam Acharya ra Unka Kriti

== Recognition ==
Acharya was commemorated in a stamp issued by the Government of Nepal 12 March 1973.

== Further studies ==
- Sahitya ra Srasta
