= Rana palaces of Nepal =

Government residences in Nepal

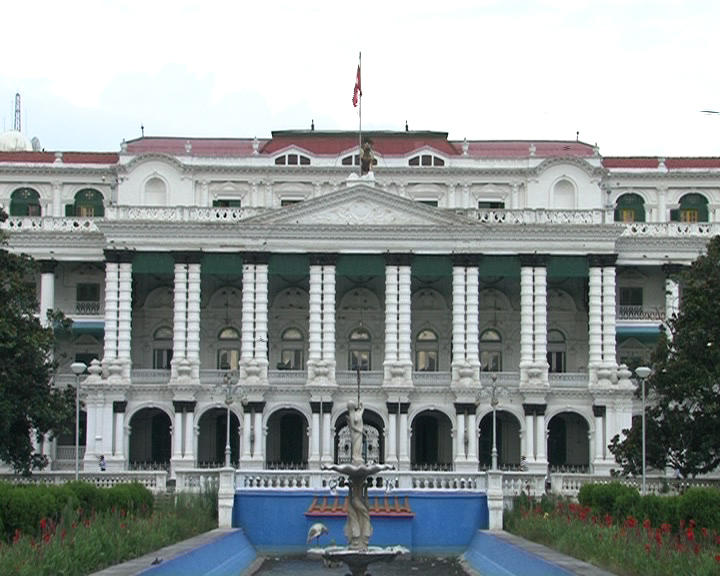
Singha Durbar

The Rana palaces of Nepal were built by the Rana dynasty rulers of Nepal as both private and government buildings. The Rana rule lasted for 104 years, and during that time a number of grand royal residences were built, especially by the Prime Minister, his immediate family, and other high-ranking dignitaries.

After the overthrow of the Rana Dynasty, some palaces were converted into government buildings. Others were demolished by their owners and rebuilt into libraries, museums, hotels, and heritage complexes. Most palaces still in private ownership have been destroyed or lie in ruins. Most government-owned palaces have been maintained and restored.

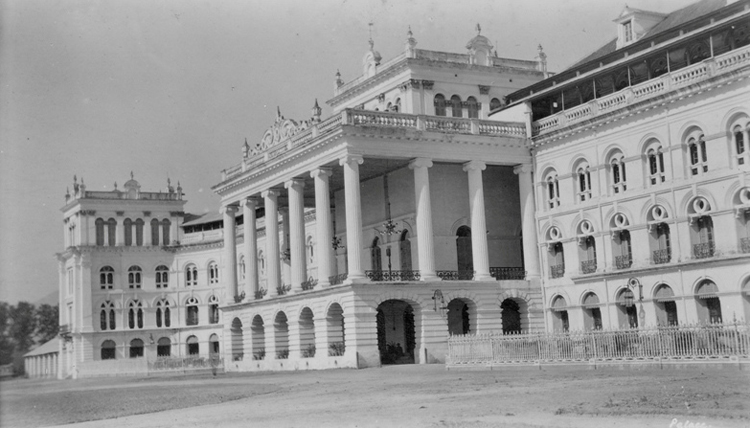
Old Narayanhiti Palace ca.1920, demolished in 1958.

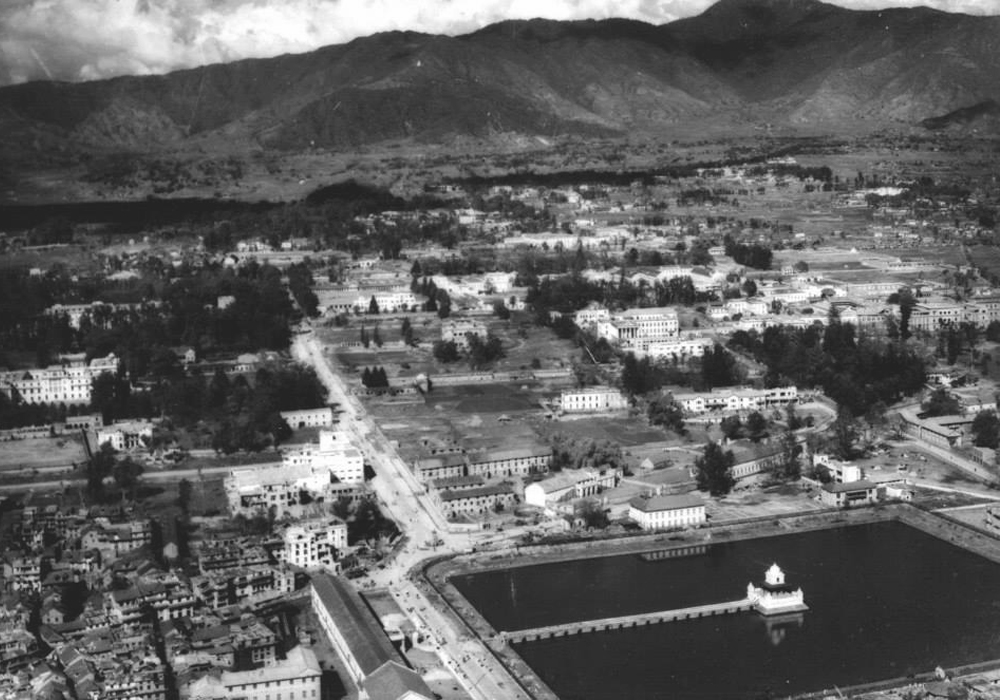
Bird's Eye view of Kathmandu North of Dharara with white Rana palaces-1950s

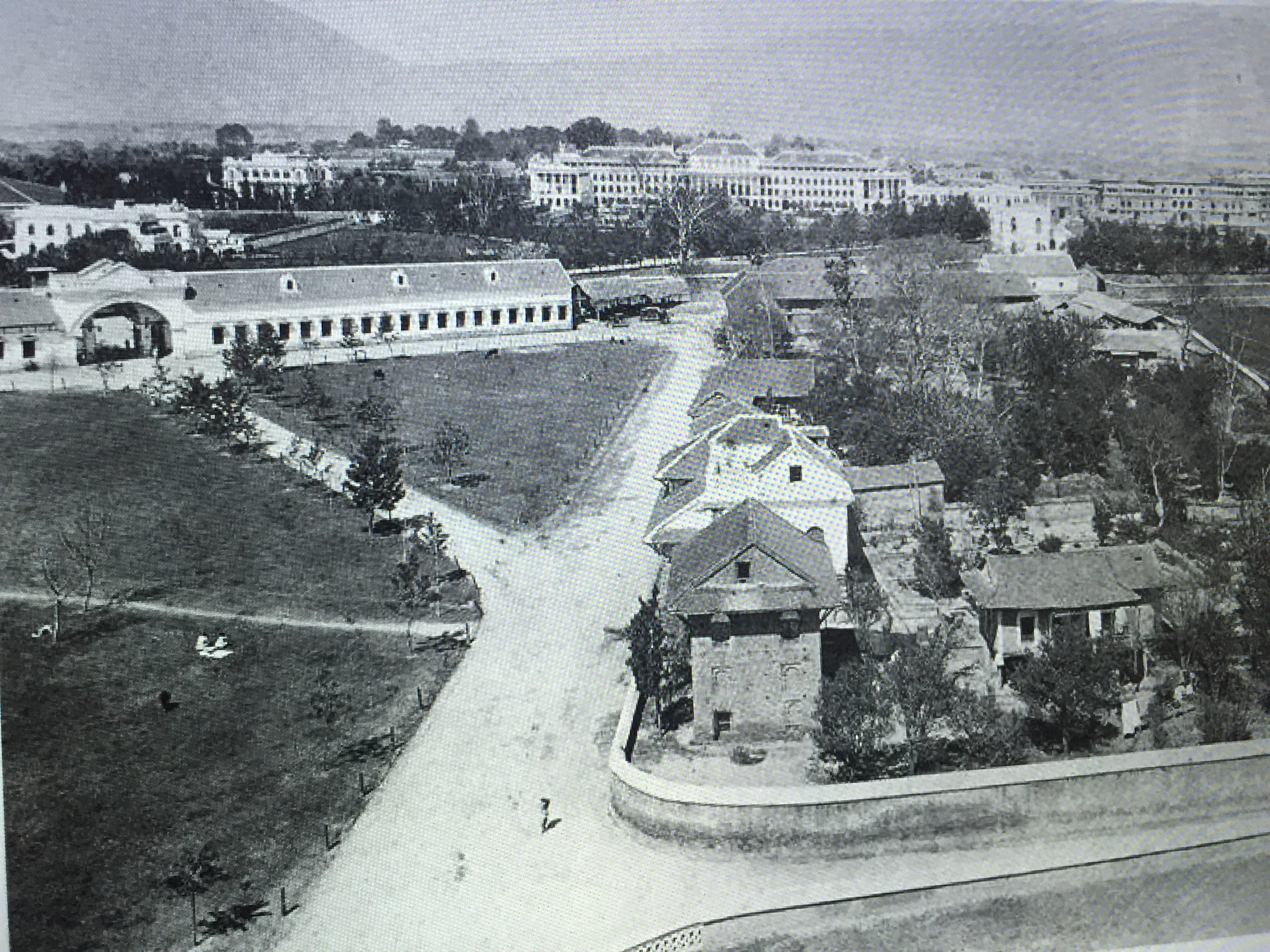
Seto Durbar gate in the left and Narayanhiti palace in the middle of the picture

== Basic information ==
Foreign-trained Newar architects designed most of the palaces.

== Palaces ==
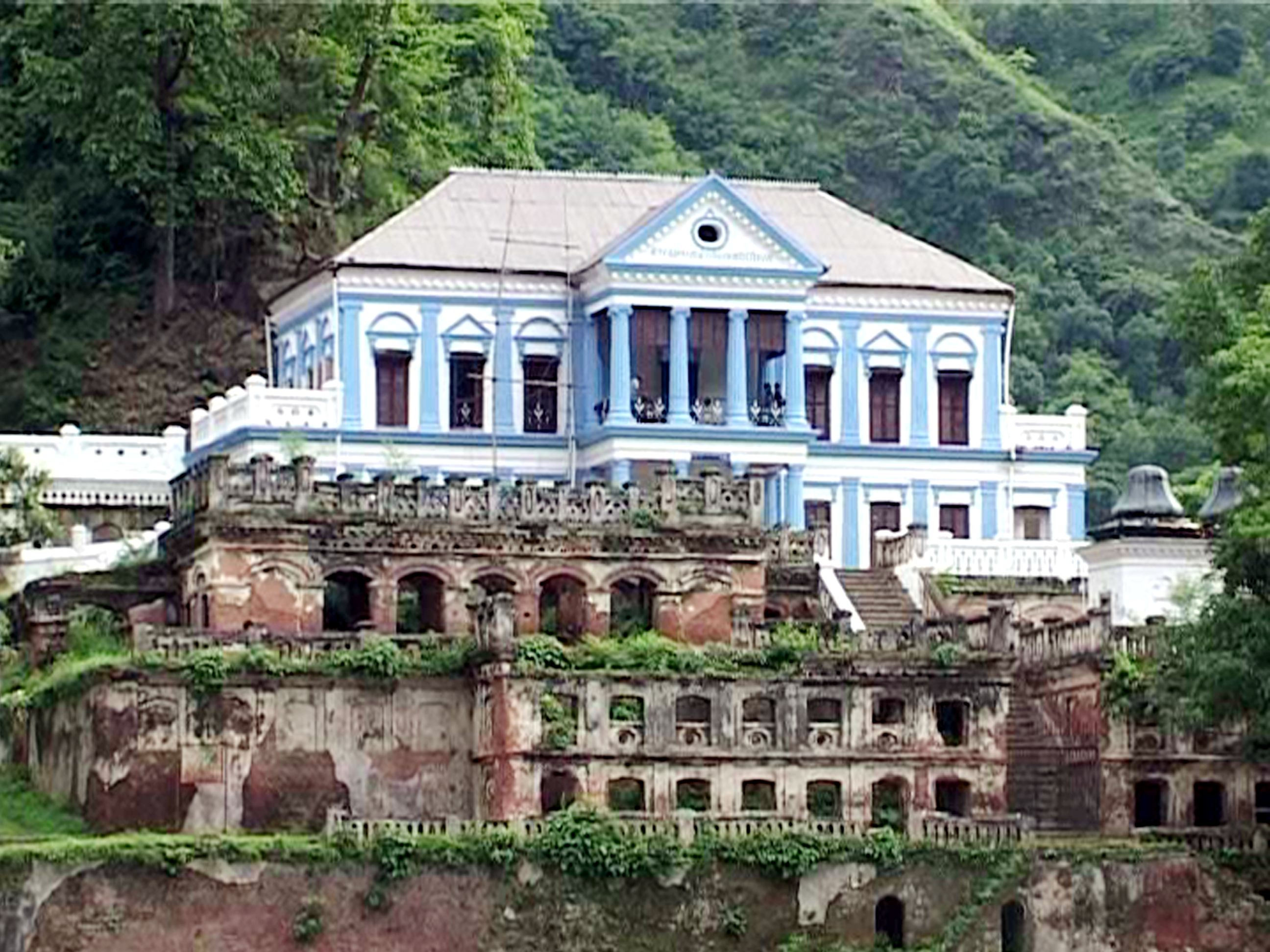
Rani Mahal (Ranighat Palace) in Palpa

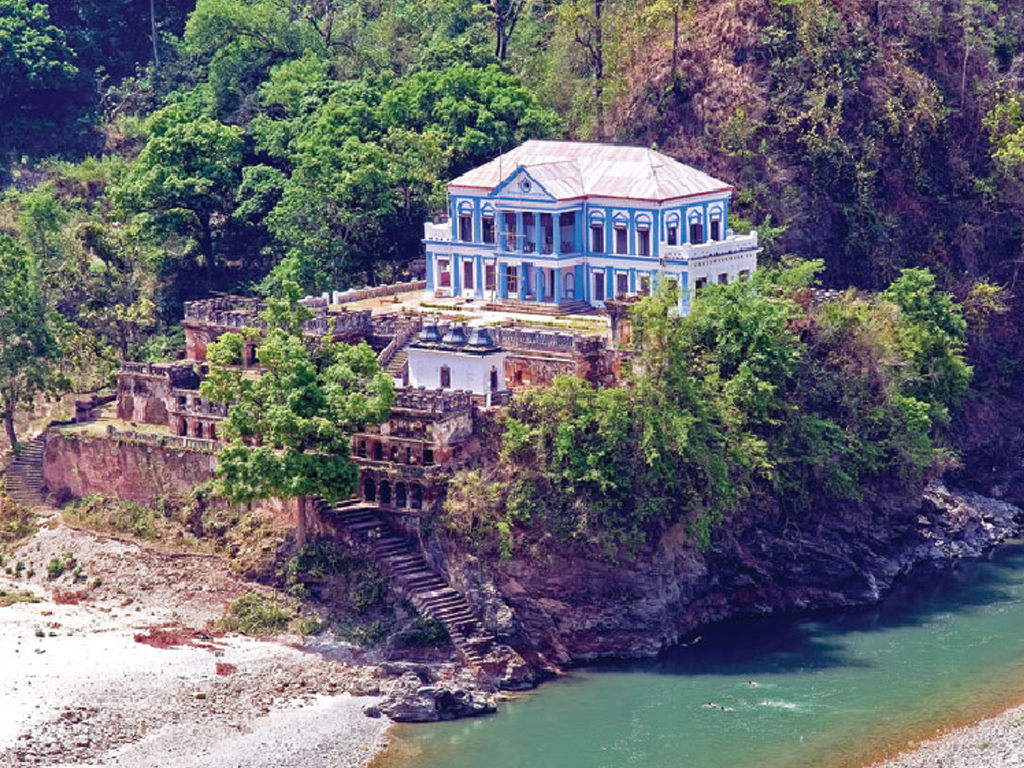
Rani Mahal, Palpa

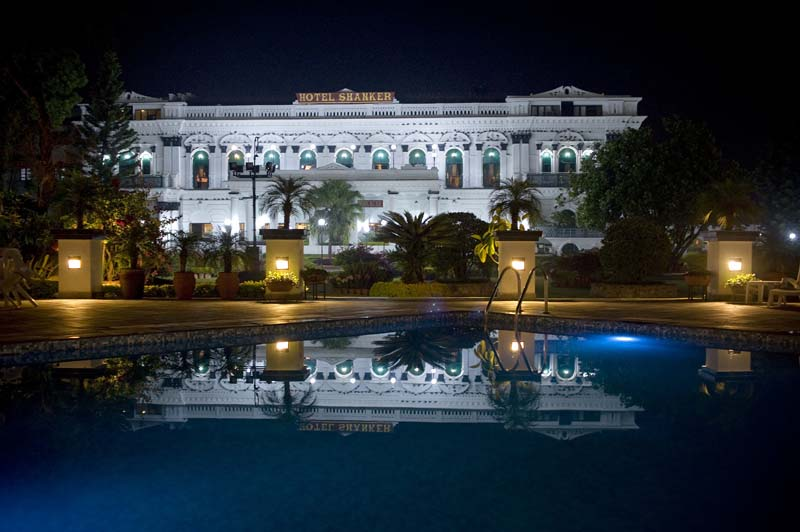
Lazimpat Durbar

Palace	Commissioned By	Date of Construction	Engineer
Thapathali Durbar	Jung Bahadur Rana	Late 1700s-1860s	Initial Unknown, Later by Ranasur Bista
Singha Mahal	Jung Bahadur Rana	1855 CE	Ranasur Bista
Charburja Durbar	Jung Bahadur Rana	1855 CE	Ranasur Bista
Gol Baithak	Jung Bahadur Rana	1852	Ranasur Bista
Narayanhity Durbar	Bir Shumsher JBR		Jogbir Sthapit
Lal Durbar	Bir Shumsher JBR	1890	Jogbir Sthapit
Seto Durbar	Bir Shumsher JBR	1893	Jogbir Sthapit
Bhatbhateni Durbar	Bir Shumsher JBR	1893	Jogbir Sthapit
Jaulakhel Durbar	Bir Shumsher JBR	1897	Jogbir Sthapit
Pani pokahari Durbar	Bir Shumsher JBR	1885	Jogbir Sthapit
Phohora Durbar	Bir Shumsher JBR	1896/97	Jogbir Sthapit
Hatti Shar Durbar	Bir Shumsher JBR		Jogbir Sthapit
Lazimpat Durbar	Kaji Bir Keshar Pande and later re commissioned by Bir Shumsher JBR	1894	Jogbir Sthapit
Tangal Durbar	Bir Shumsher JBR	1889	Jogbir Sthapit
Muduli Durbar	Bir Shumsher JBR	1893/92	Unknown
Bhanjaraja Durbar	Probably Bir Shumsher JBR	Unknown	Unknown
Singha Durbar	Chandra Shumsher JBR	1908	Kumar Narsingh Rana, Kishor Narsingh Rana
Kaiser Mahal	Chandra Shumsher JBR		Kumar Narsingh Rana, Kishor Narsingh Rana
Shree Durbar	Chandra Shumsher JBR	1927	Kumar Narsingh Rana, Kishor Narsingh Rana
Sithal Niwas	Chandra Shumsher JBR	1923	Kumar Narsingh Rana, Kishor Narsingh Rana
Lakshmi Niwas	Chandra Shumsher JBR	1905	Kumar Narsingh Rana, Kishor Narsingh Rana
Harihar Bhawan	Chandra Shumsher JBR		Kumar Narsingh Rana, Kishor Narsingh Rana
Babar Mahal	Chandra Shumsher JBR		Kumar Narsingh Rana, Kishor Narsingh Rana
Man Bhawan	Juddha Shumsher JBR		Unknown
Kalimati Durbar	Juddha Shumsher JBR		Unknown
Narayan Bhawan	Juddha Shumsher JBR		Unknown
Surendra Bhawan	Juddha Shumsher JBR		Unknown
Kalimati Durbar	Juddha Shumsher JBR		Unknown
Narayan Bhawan	Juddha Shumsher JBR		Unknown
Shashi Bhawan	Juddha Shumsher JBR		Unknown
Hiti Durbar	Kaji Dhokal Singh Basnyat		Unknown
Bahadur Bhawan	Rudra Shumsher JBR		Unknown
Manohara Durbar	Jagat Jung Rana	1879	Unknown
Ranighat Palace	Khadga Shumsher JBR	1893	Unknown
Tansen Durbar	Pratap Shamsher Jang Bahadur Rana	1927	Unknown
Minbhawan Palace	Min Shumsher	Unknown	Unknown
Rabi Bhawan Palace	Rabi Shumsher	Unknown	Unknown
Bagh Durbar	Amar Singh Thapa (Sanu) (Note: Not to be confused with the better known commander of Gorkhali forces in the Gurkha War with the same name. The two Amar Singhs are differentiated by the qualifier Bada (greater) and Sanu (lesser).)(Father of Bhimsingh Thapa)		Unknown

== Earthquake of 2015 ==
The earthquake of 2015 resulted in the destruction of many remaining palaces, particularly those built of mud-mortar brick and lime plaster.

== See also ==
- Daudaha system
- Singha Durbar
- Rani Mahal
