= Bhatbhateni Durbar =

General information
- Architectural style: Fusion of Neoclassical architecture, Mughal, European styles of architecture
- Location: Kathmandu, Nepal
- Construction started: 1893
- Demolished: 1934
- Cost: Unknown
- Client: Bir Shumsher JBR

Technical details
- Structural system: Brick and Mortar
- Size: 375 ropanis

Design and construction
- Architect: Jogbir Sthapit

Bhatbhateni Durbar was a Rana palace in Kathmandu, Nepal. The palace complex, located in Hadigau, was incorporated in an impressive and vast array of courtyards, furnishings and guest halls. Bhatbhateni Durbar was built by Bir Shumsher JBR in 1888.

== History ==
Bhatbhateni Durbar was built by Bir Shumsher JBR as a private residence for his second son Dharma Shumsher. It was spread over 160 Ropani. In 1901 after Bir Shamsher's death Dharma Shamsher JBR, moved to this palace from Seto Durbar. After Dharma Shumsher's death, all his property along with Bhatbhateni palace was inherited to his adopted son (Gehendra Shamsher JBRs second son) Ekaraj Shumsher. After Ekaraj Shimsher's death in 1932 the entire palace was torn apart and land sold in pieces.

== Current status ==
Nothing remains of the historical Bhatbhateni Durbar today. Most of the land occupied by Bhatbhateni Supermarket and Anti Corruption Bureau stands on the grounds of Bhatbhateni Durbar

== See also ==
- Seto Durbar
- Lal Durbar
- Gehendra Shamsher JBR
