= Jaulakhel Durbar =

Coordinates: 27.4243°N 85.1910°E

Jaulakhel (i.e. Jawalakhel)Durbar
- Interactive map of the Jaulakhel (i.e. Jawalakhel)Durbar area

General information
- Architectural style: Fusion of Neoclassical architecture, Mughal, European styles of architecture
- Location: Kathmandu, Nepal
- Construction started: 1944 BS
- Cost: Unknown
- Client: Bir Shumsher Jang Bahadur Rana

Technical details
- Structural system: Brick and Mortar
- Size: 375 ropanis

Design and construction
- Architect: Jogbir Sthapit

Jaulakhel Durbar (Jaulakhel Palace) was a Rana palace in Jawalakhel, Lalitpur, a city in Kathmandu Valley, Nepal. Jaulakhel Durbar was built by Bir Shumsher Jang Bahadur Rana in 1954 BS.

== History ==
Jaulakhel Durbar was heavily damaged during the Earthquake of 1990 BS and was later renovated and given by Juddha Shumsher JBR to his son Surya Shumsher. After Surya's Death his only son Yuvaraj Shumsher inherited it.

The Jawalakhel Zoo was built on the grounds of Jawalakhel Durbar by General Maheswar Shamshere Rana at the behest of his grandfather Juddha Shamshere. It was a private zoo later made into the only national zoo in Nepal.

== Club Rondeau ==
Jaulakhel Durbar was later turned into Club Rondeau by Yuvaraj Shumsher in 2007 BS.

== Under Government of Nepal ==
After being unsuccessful in business Yuvaraj Shumsher sold Jaulakhel Durbar along with Club Rondeau. Currently the palace is occupied by a branch of the Office of Land Reform and Management.

== See also ==
- Rana palaces of Nepal
- Mathabarsingh Thapa
- Jung Bahadur Rana
