= Phora Durbar =

Phora Durbar was a palace built by Bir Shumsher Jang Bahadur Rana in 1895 in Kathmandu, Nepal. Located right in front of Narayanhiti Palace and spread over 8 acres, the palace was sold to the United States in 1966 after which it was demolished promptly to build an embassy facility/private club for American embassy staff and invited guests. Phora Durbar is also called the "American Club" or even "Little America".
