= Manohara Durbar =

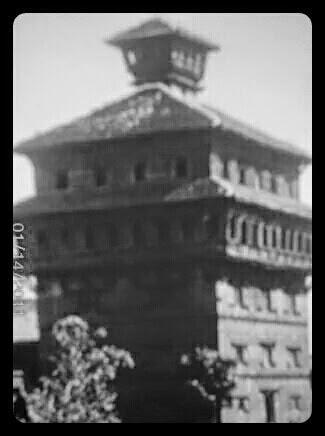

General information
- Architectural style: Neoclassical architecture and European styles of architecture
- Location: Kathmandu, Nepal
- Completed: 1879
- Client: Jagat Jung Rana

Technical details
- Structural system: Brick and Mortar
- Size: 500 Ropani

Manohara Durbar was a seven-storied Rana palace in Manohara, Kathmandu, the capital of Nepal. The palace complex was located 12 kilometres (7.5 mi) Southeast of the core of Kathmandu. It included a vast array of courtyards, gardens, and buildings.

== History ==
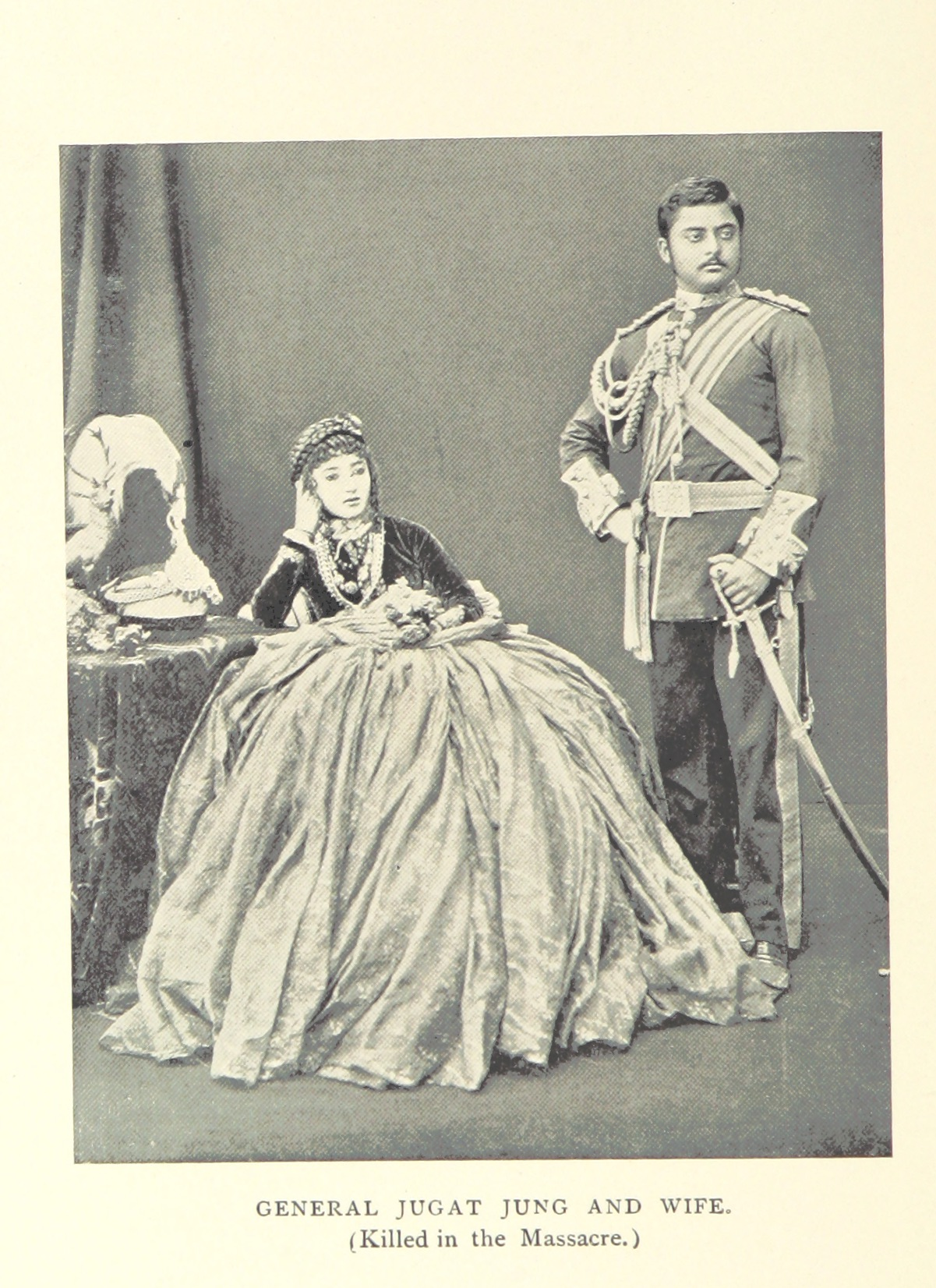
Jagat Jung, who constructed the palace

Manohara Durbar was built in 1879, by Jung Bahadur Rana's son, Commanding General Jagat Jung Rana, as his private residence. After the murder of Jagat Jung in 1886, Manohara Durbar was used as a prison for royal women from both the Rana and Shah families found guilty of adultery.

== Current status ==
Even after the fall of the Rana regime, the ruins of Manohara palace could be seen until the late 1950s, but today, the only remaining element is a large pine tree from 1879.

== See also ==
- Babarmahal Revisited
- Thapathali Durbar
- Garden of Dreams
- Rana palaces of Nepal
