= Bagh Durbar =

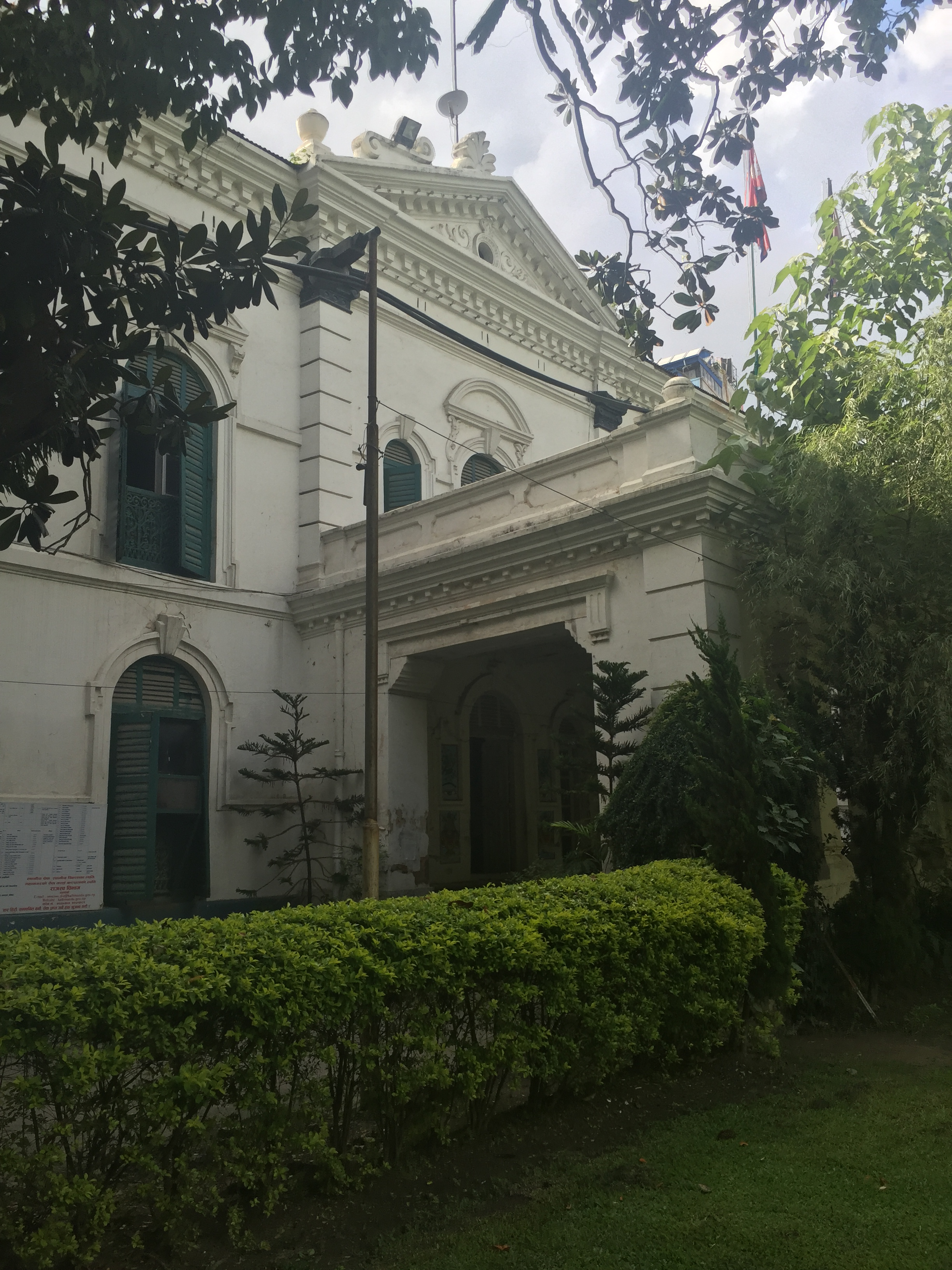

General information
- Architectural style: Neoclassical architecture and Mughal architecture
- Location: Kathmandu, Nepal
- Cost: Unknown
- Client: Amar Singh Thapa, Bhimsen Thapa

Technical details
- Structural system: Brick and Mortar

Bagh Durbar, (Nepali: बाघ दरबार) is a palace in Kathmandu, Nepal, west of the Dharahara and Tundikhel. Initially the palace was owned by Amar Singh Thapa (Sardar) (Note: Not to be confused with the better known commander of Gorkhali forces in the Gurkha War with the same name. The two Amar Singhs are differentiated by the qualifier Bada (greater) and Sanu (lesser).) of the Thapa regime and his descendant, but later was occupied by the Royals of the Shah dynasty and the government of Nepal.

== History ==
The palace complex lay in the heart of Kathmandu to the north of the Bagmati River. The history of the palace is closely linked with the history of Nepal and its rulers.

== Earthquake 2015 ==
This Palace was seriously damaged during the April 2015 Nepal earthquake. Currently the Kathmandu Metropolitan Office has started evacuation. The future of the Historical building is unknown.

== Gallery ==
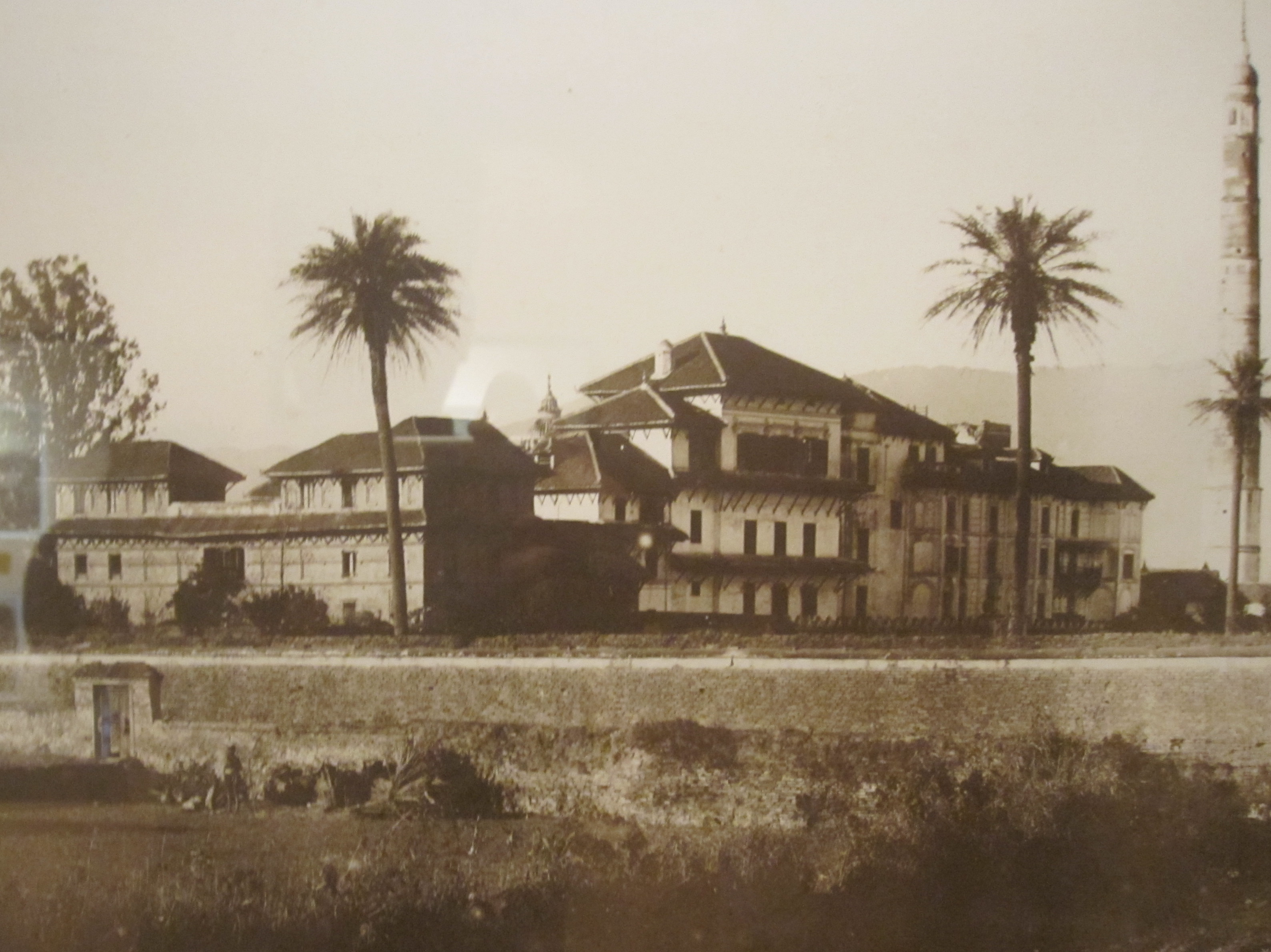
Side view

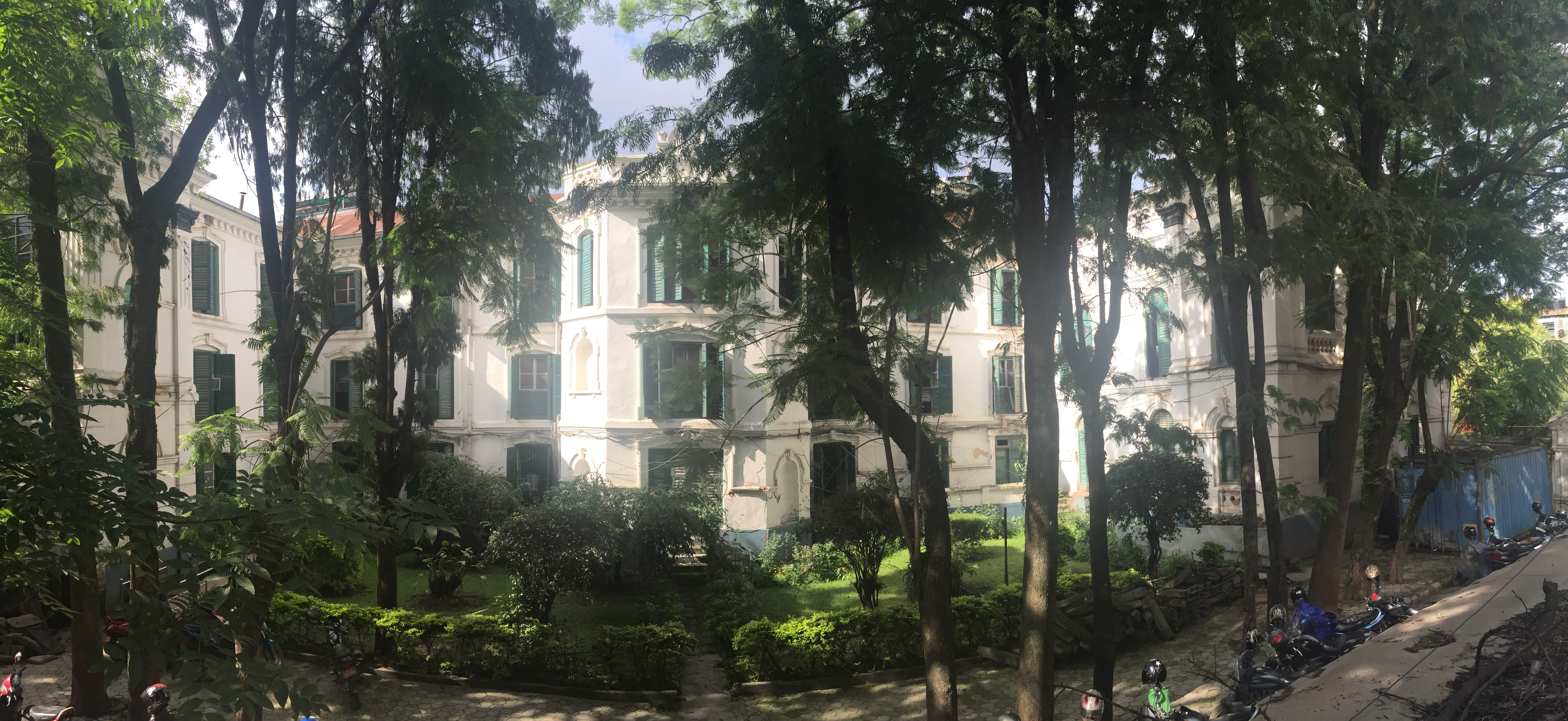
Side view

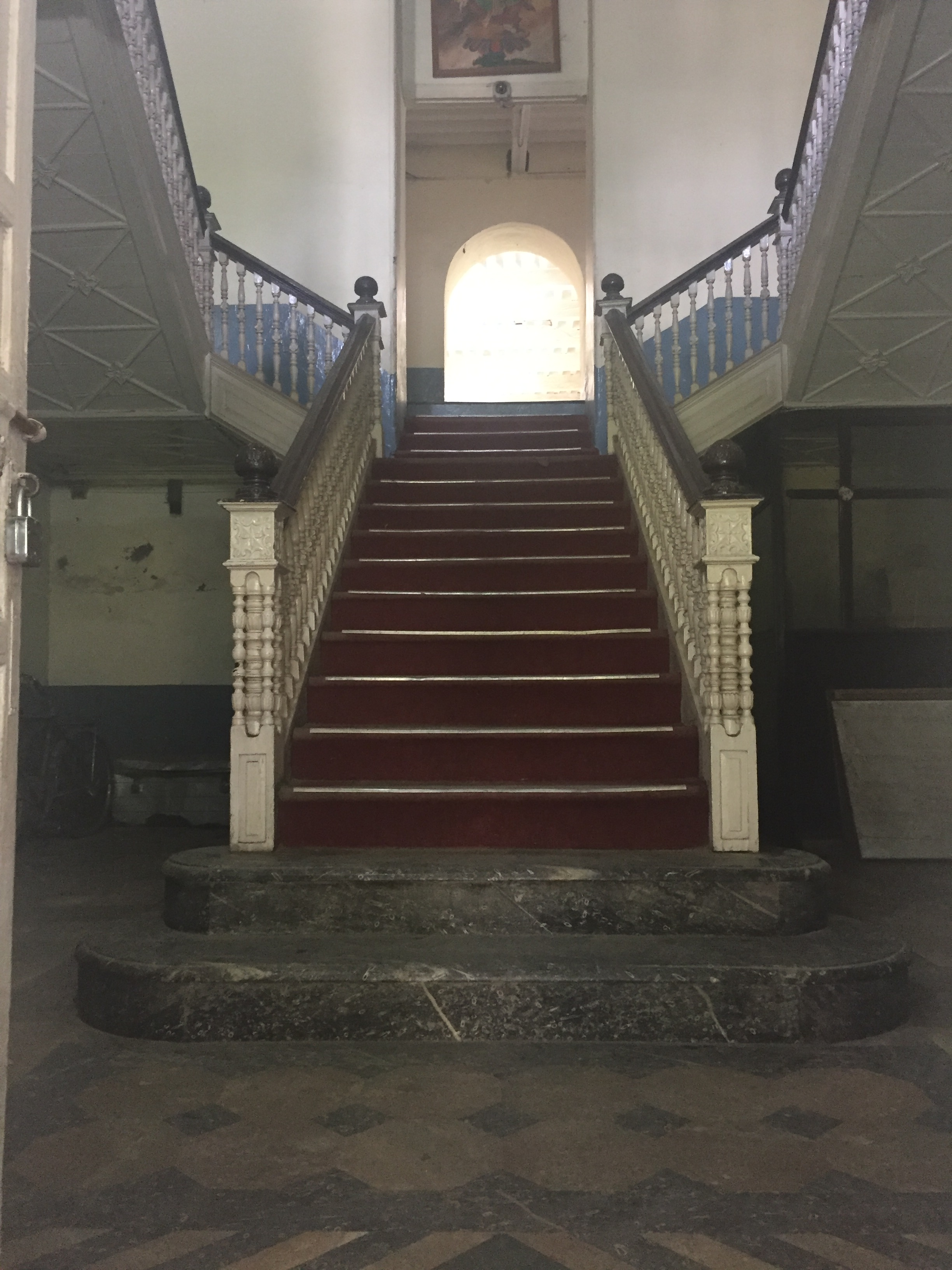
Main staircase of Bagh Durbar

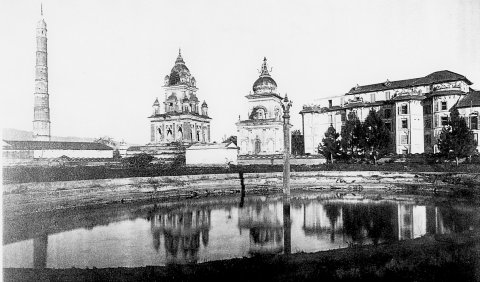
Bagh Durbar and Ram Chandra Temples Before 1935

== See also ==
- Rana palaces of Nepal
- Thapathali Durbar
- Jung Bahadur Rana
