= Ranasur Bista =

Ranasur Bista (Nepali: रणसूर बिस्ट) was a Nepali architect involved in the building of early Rana palaces of Nepal.

== Work ==
Ranasur Bista is mainly credited for building and designing Rana palaces. Some of his major projects are:

- Thapathali Durbar
- Singha Mahal
- Charburja Durbar
- Gol Baithak
- Narayanhity Palace (Ranodip Singh Kunwar's, but later was demolished)

== See also ==
- Rana palaces of Nepal
- Thapathali Durbar
