= Charburja Durbar =

Coordinates: 27.4128598°N 85.193601°E

- Interactive map of the Charburja Durbar area

General information
- Architectural style: Fusion of Mughal and European styles of architecture
- Location: Kathmandu, Nepal
- Cost: Unknown
- Client: Jung Bahadur Rana

Technical details
- Structural system: Brick and Mortar

Design and construction
- Architect: Ranasur Bista

Charburja Durbar was a palace within Thapathali Durbar Complex in Kathmandu, the capital of the Nepal. Charburja literally translates Four Burg Palace. This palace was built by Jung Bahadur Rana in the year 1849 for Jind Kaur (locally known as Chanda kunwar in Nepal) youngest Queen consort of Maharaja Ranjit Singh of Sikh Empire.

== History ==
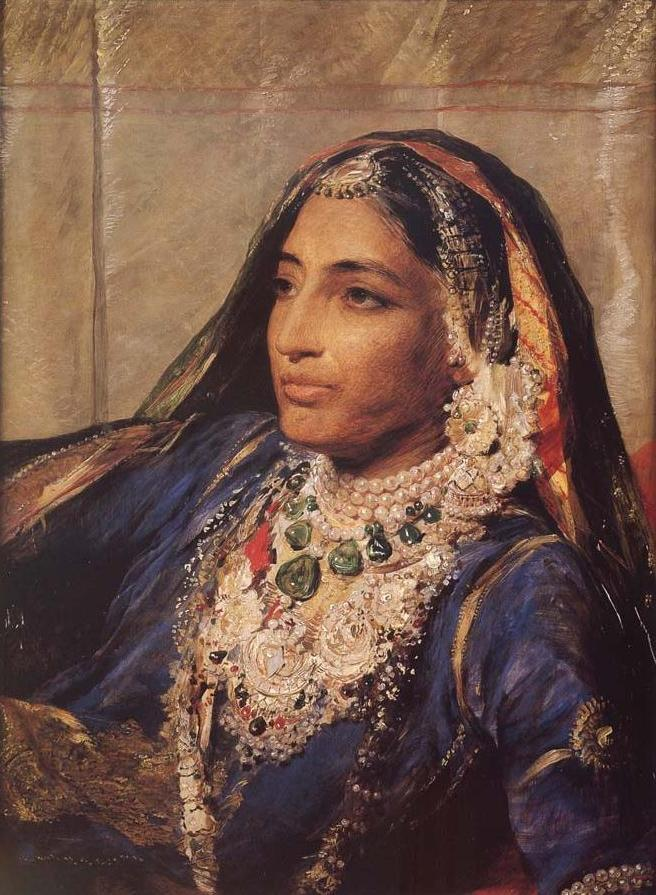
Maharani Jind Kaur

Charburja Durbar was built by Jung Bahadur Rana for Rani Jind Kaur, youngest Queen of Maharaja Ranjit Singh of Sikh Empire. Initially, she stayed at the residence of Amar Bikram Shah, son of General Chautariya Pushkar Shah, who had been Nepal's Prime Minister in 1838–39. Amar Bikram Shah's residence in the Narayanhiti area provided her with the facilities and dignity offered to royalty. But whenever outsiders came, she would disguise herself and was introduced as a "maid/cook from Hindusthan". She stayed in Amar Bikram Shah's house for a few months before she decided to come out of her hiding and approach the then Prime Minister Jung Bahadur Rana.

Kaur was given asylum by Jung Bahadur Rana as a Queen consort of Maharaja Ranjit Singh.

== Earthquake of 1934 ==
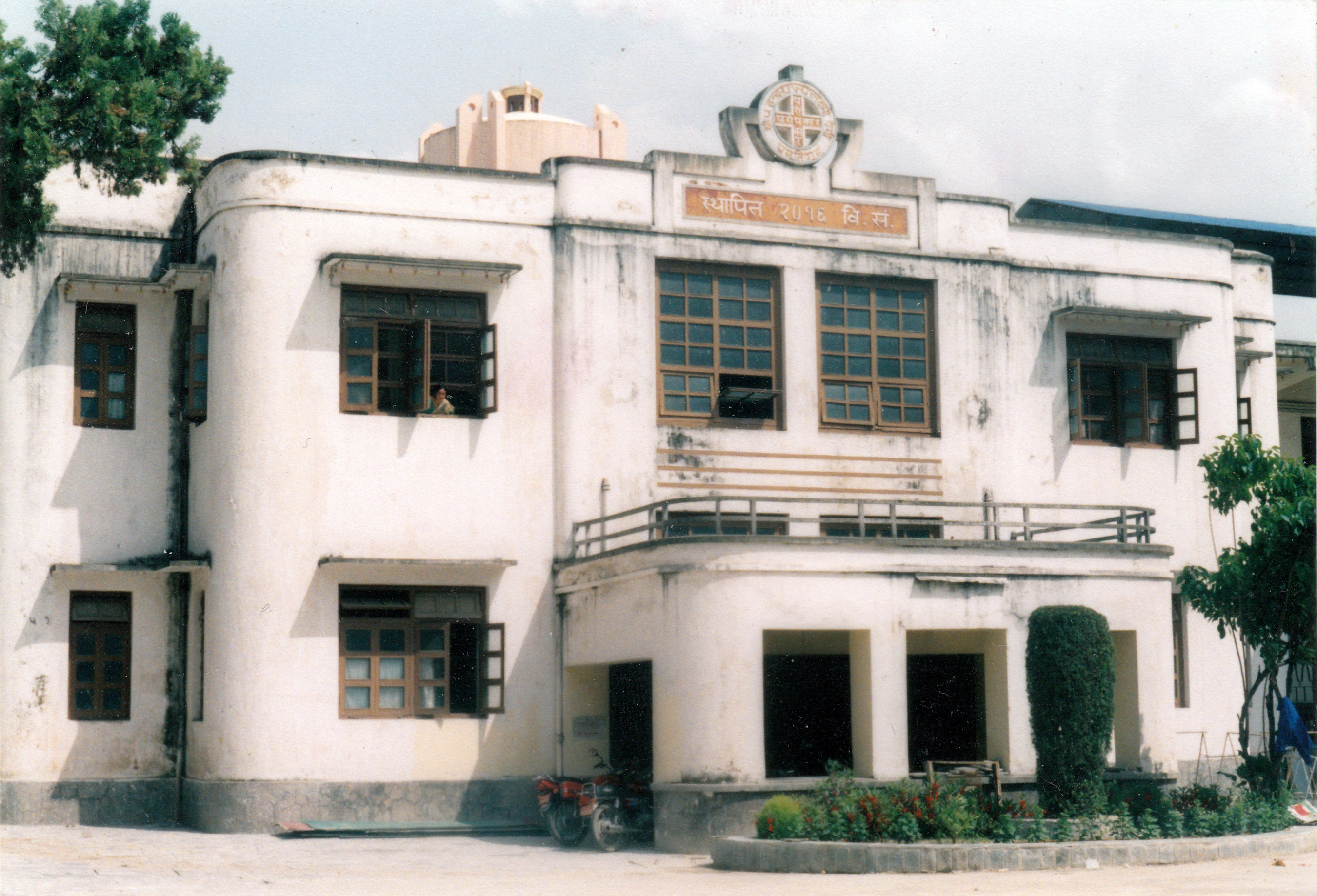
Prasuti Griha build on the grounds of Charburja Durbar

Charburja Durbar was seriously damaged during the 1934 Nepal–Bihar earthquake. Charburja Durbar was not repaired and finally turned into ruins.

== Current status ==
Today in the grounds of Charburja Durbar, Paropakar Indra Rajya Lakshmi Devi Prasuti Griha maternity hospital is built. Popularly known as Prasuti Griha, Nepal's first maternity hospital and opened on 26 September 1959.

== See also ==
- Rana palaces of Nepal
- Jung Bahadur Rana
- Ranjit Singh
- Jind Kaur
- Chautariya Puskhar Shah
