= Seto Durbar =

Coordinates: 27.4243°N 85.1910°E

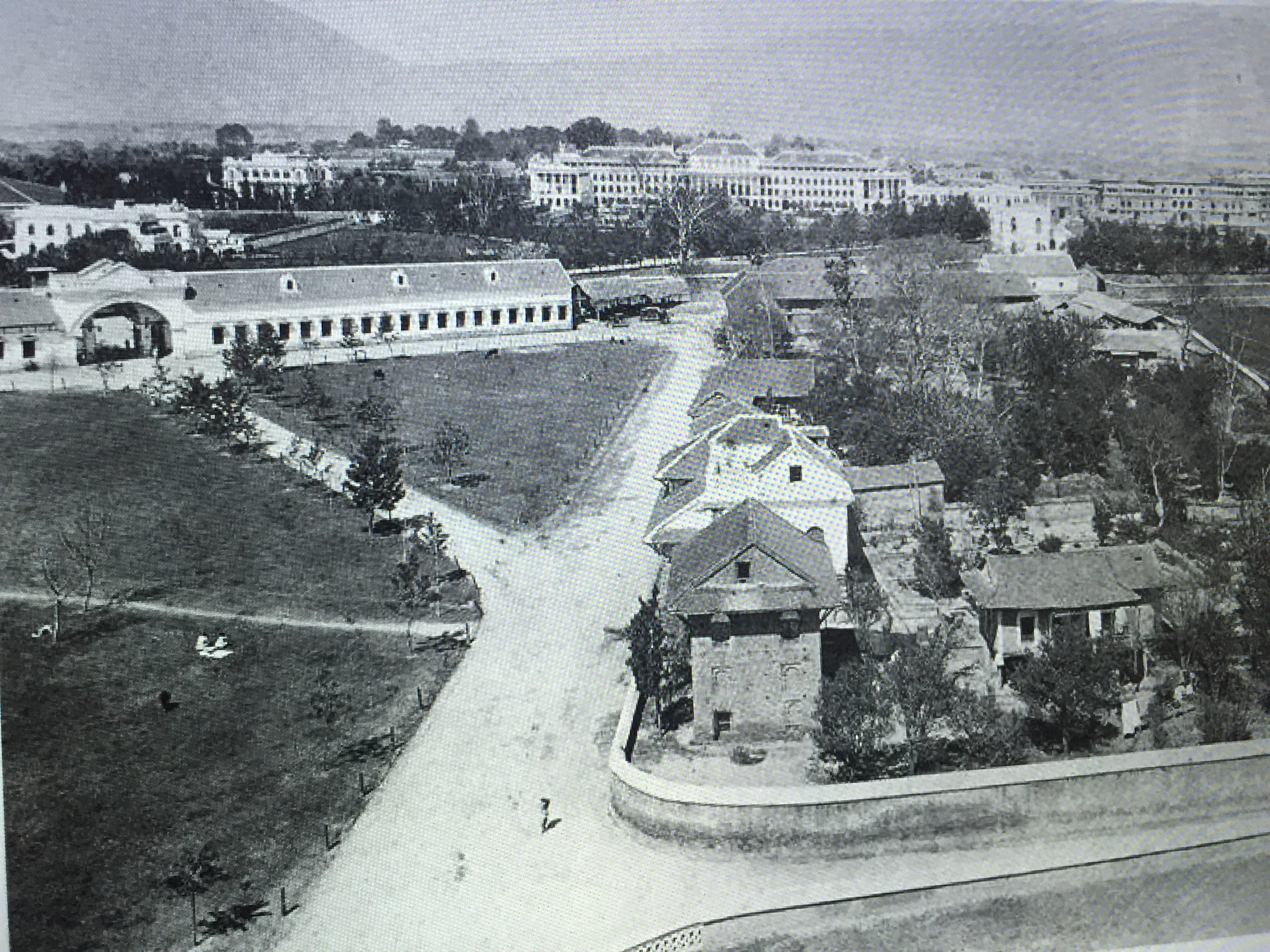
- Interactive map of the Seto Durbar area

General information
- Architectural style: Fusion of Neoclassical architecture, Mughal, European styles of architecture
- Location: Kathmandu, Nepal
- Construction started: 1893
- Demolished: 1934
- Cost: Unknown
- Client: Bir Shumsher Jung Bahadur Rana

Technical details
- Structural system: Brick and Mortar
- Size: 375 ropanis

Design and construction
- Architect: Jogbir Sthapit

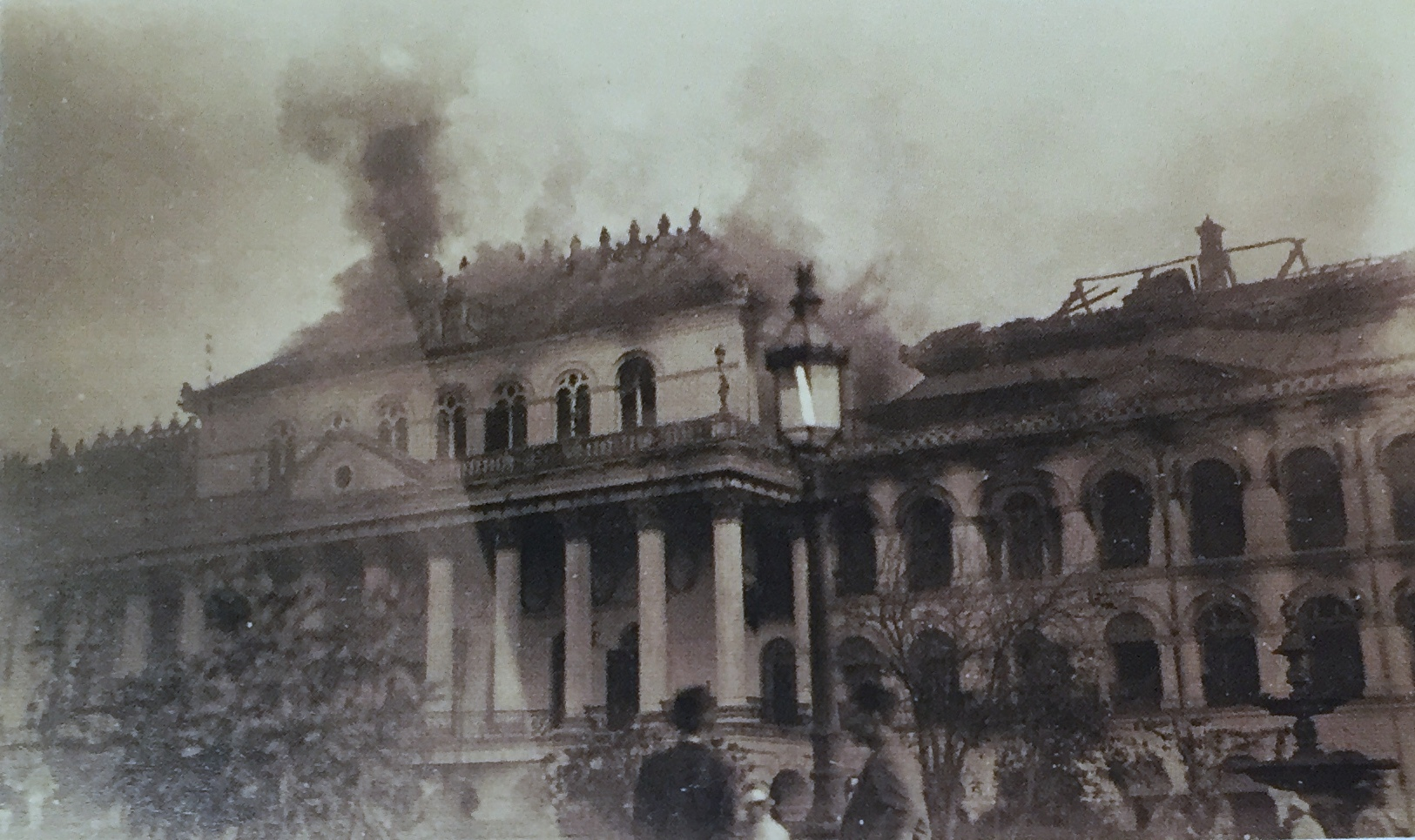
Fire at seto Durbar, 1934

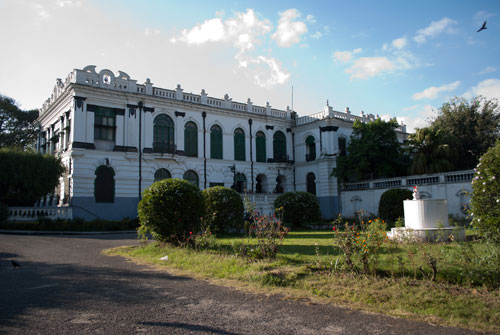
Small remaining wing of Seto Durbar currently occupied by NIDC Development Bank

Seto Durbar (White Palace) was a Rana palace in Kathmandu, the capital of Nepal, located south of the Narayanhity Palace. It was built by Bir Shumsher Jung Bahadur Rana in 1893 CE.

== History ==
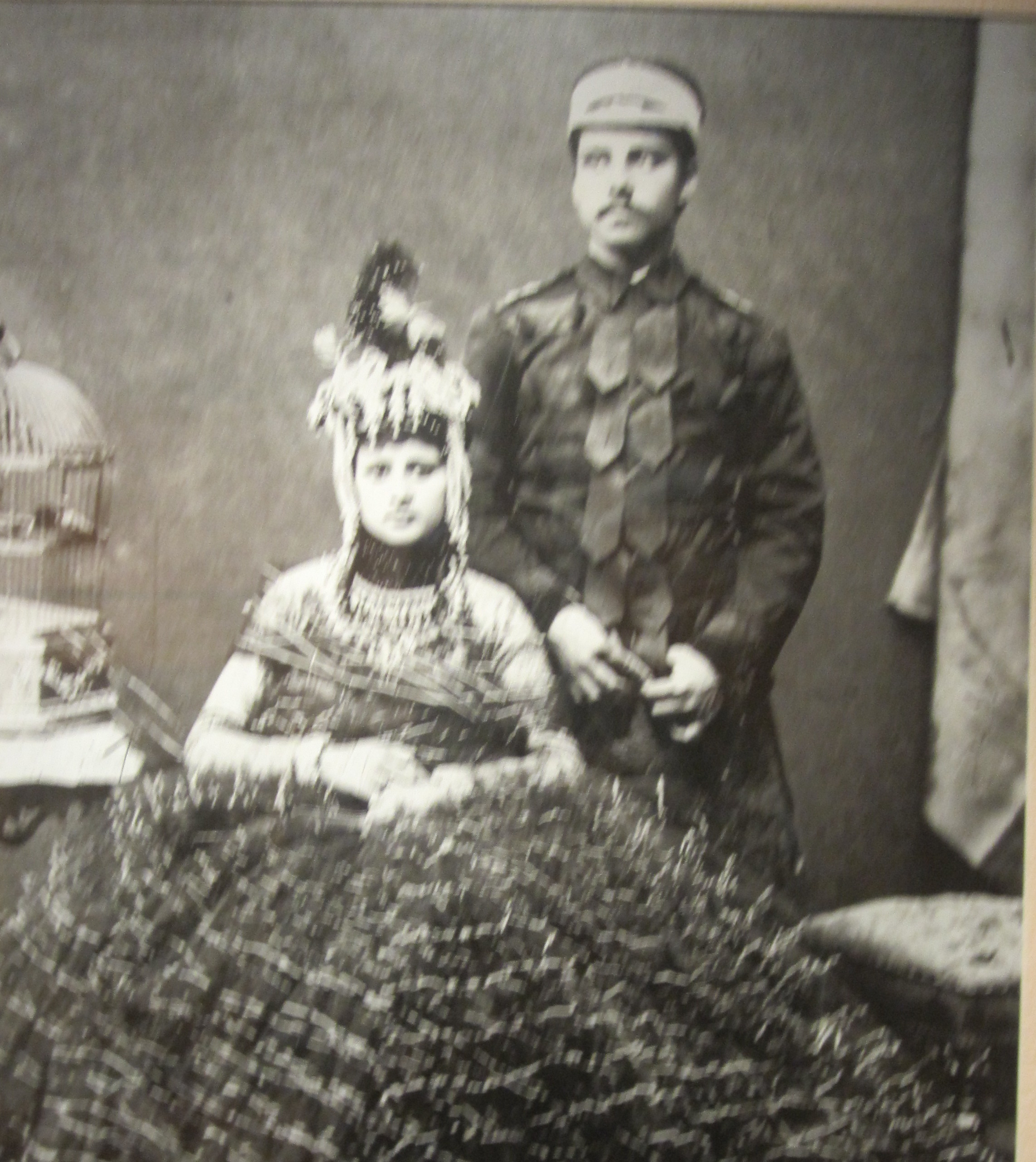
Gehendra Shumsher JBR

Seto Durbar was built by Bir Shumsher JBR in 1893 CE in a land area of 375 ropani with Lal Durbar to its northeast as his private residence.

== Grand State Hall ==
Seto durbar was famous for its Grand State Hall known as Thulo Baithak or Big hall.

== Destruction of the Seto Durbar ==
The only remains of Seto durbar is a building occupied by NIDC Development Bank Head Office in Durbar Marg.

== Legacy ==
Today most of the Hotel Annapurna stands on the grounds of Seto Durbar

== See also ==
- Bhimsen Thapa
- Jung Bahadur Rana
- Mathabarsingh Thapa
