= Harihar Bhawan =

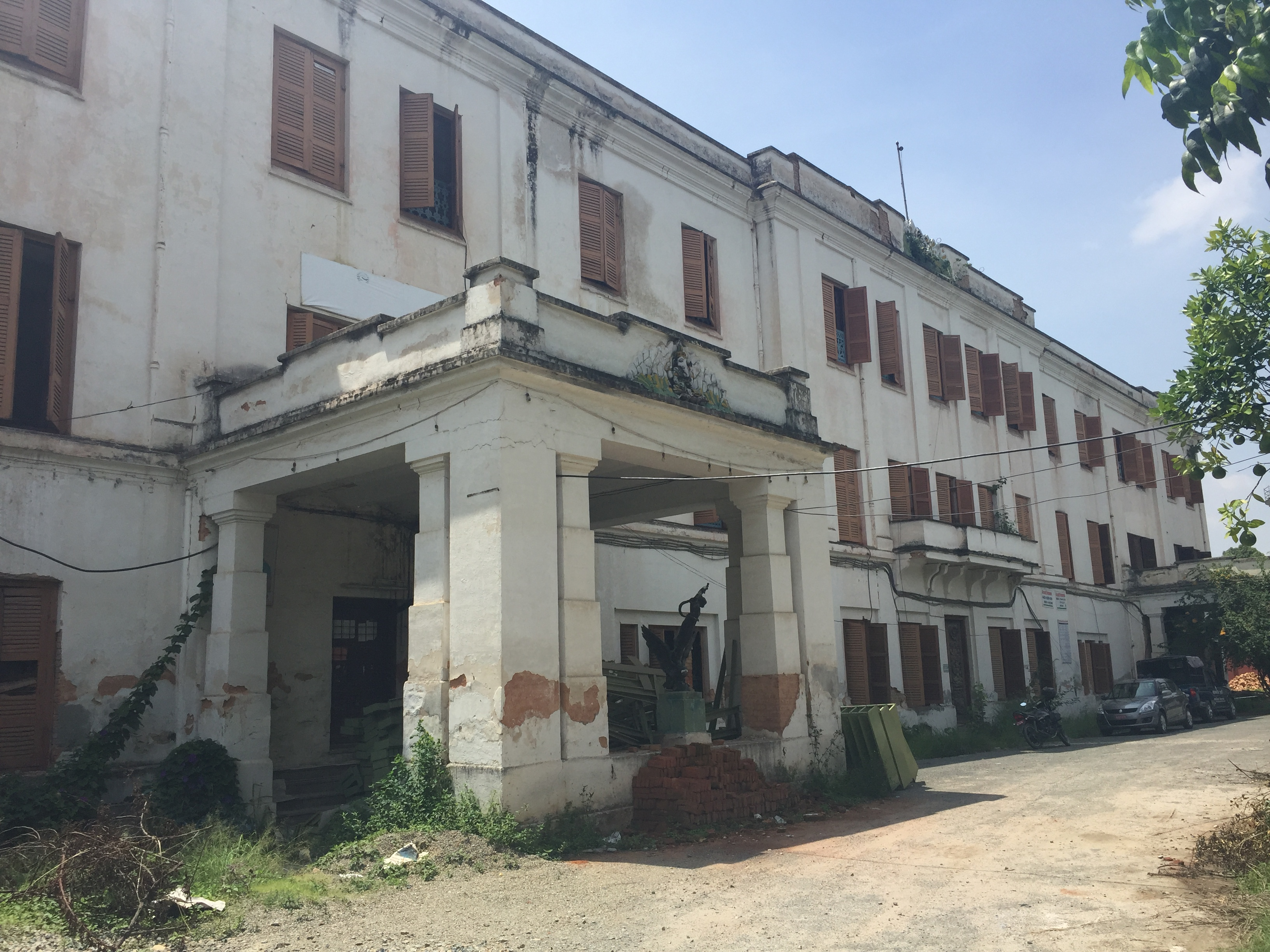
- Interactive map of the Harihar Bhawan area

General information
- Architectural style: Neoclassical architecture and European styles of architecture
- Location: Lalitpur, Nepal
- Coordinates: 27.6807°N 85.31312°E
- Elevation: 1,322 metres (4,337 ft)
- Client: Chandra Shumsher JBR

Technical details
- Material: Brick and mortar

Design and construction
- Architects: Kumar Narasingh Rana and Kishor Narasingh Rana

Harihar Bhawan is a Rana palace in Patan. The palace complex, located west of the Shree Durbar, was incorporated into a vast array of courtyards, gardens and buildings.

== History ==
The palace complex lay in the heart of Kathmandu, to the west of the Shree Durbar. Harihar Bhawan was built by Chandra Shumsher Jung Bahadur Rana for his second son, Sankar Shamsher Jang Bahadur Rana.

== Under the Government of Nepal ==
After Shankar Shumsher stayed in the UK, the Government of Nepal nationalized all his properties, along with Harihar Bhawan. Currently, this palace is occupied by the Department of Agriculture, National Library of Nepal and National Human Rights Commission.

== Earthquake 2015 ==
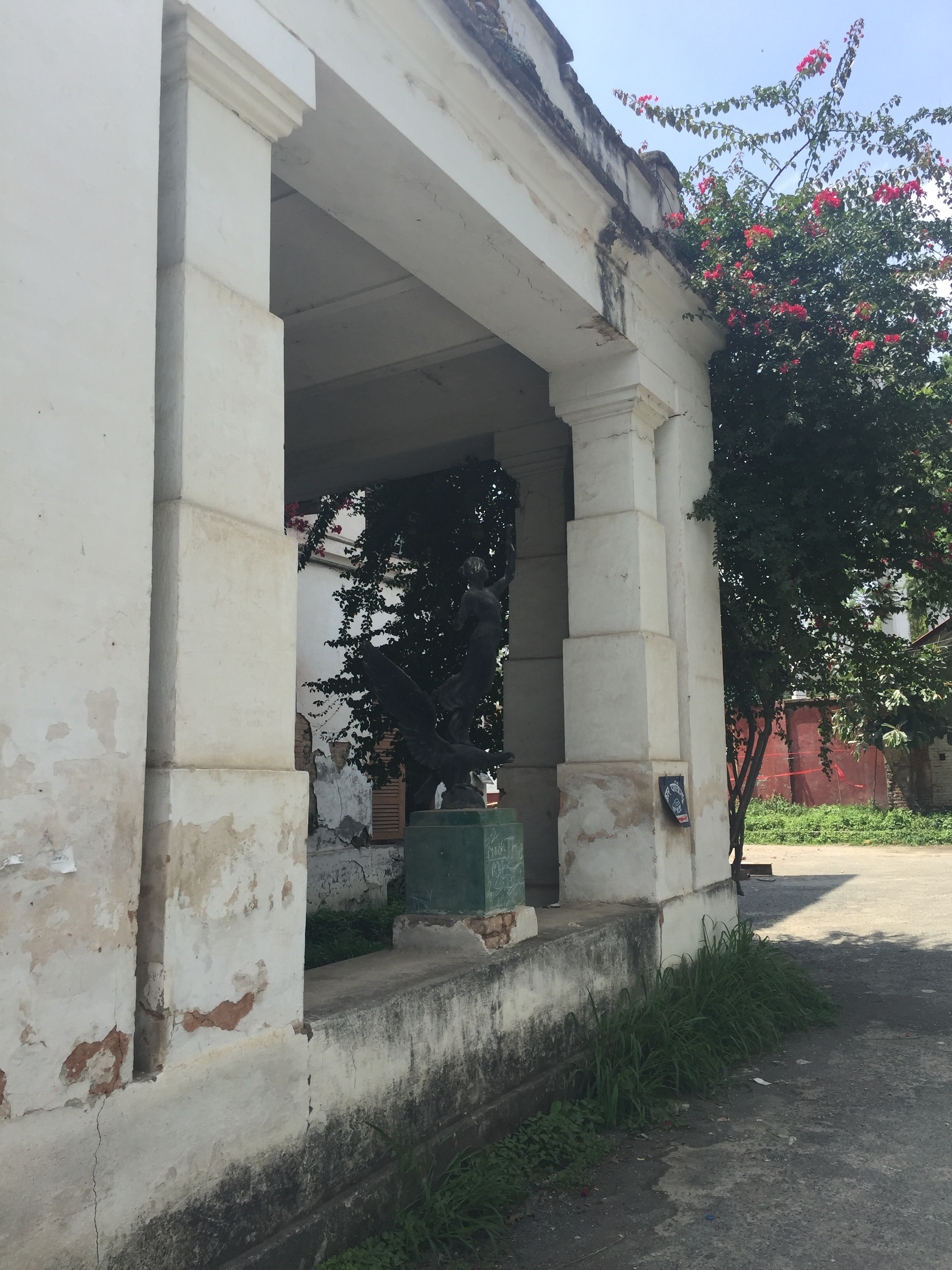
Front portico of Harihar Bhawan

This palace was partially damaged during the April 2015 Nepal earthquake, with the Department of Agriculture, national Library of Nepal, and the National Human Rights Commission evacuating.

== See also ==
- Babarmahal Revisited
- Thapathali Durbar
- Garden of Dreams
- Rana palaces of Nepal
