= Lakshmi Niwas =

General information
- Architectural style: Neoclassical architecture and European styles of architecture
- Location: Kathmandu, Nepal
- Cost: Unknown
- Client: Chandra Shumsher JBR

Technical details
- Structural system: Brick and Mortar

Design and construction
- Architects: Kumar Narasingh Rana and Kishor Narasingh Rana

Lakshmi Niwas is a Rana palace in Maharajgunj, Kathmandu, the capital of Nepal. The palace complex, located north of the Bagmati River, was incorporated in an impressive and vast array of courtyards, gardens and buildings. It was built by Chandra Shumsher JBR, who was then the prime minister and executive leader of Nepal.

== History ==
The palace complex was built by Chandra Shumsher JBR for his son Mohan Shumsher JBR in 1905 under two engineer brothers, Kumar Narasingh Rana and Kishor Narasingh Rana. Mohan Shumsher moved to Lakshmi Nivas permanently from his father's palace, Singha durbar, after the latter's death in 1929. In 1948, he moved back to Singha Durbar as prime minister. He was ordered by the Nepalese government to leave the palace after the fall of the Rana dynasty. He therefore returned to Lakshmi Niwas in 1953.

Later, Shumser he fled from Nepal, causing the nationalization of all his property along with Lakshmi Niwas. Currently the palace is occupied and owned by the Nepal army.

== See also ==
- Rana palaces of Nepal
- Thapathali Durbar
- Singha Durbar
