= Paropakar Maternity and Women's Hospital =

Hospital in Kathmandu, Bagmati, Nepal

Paropakar Maternity and Women's Hospital परोपकार प्रसूति तथा स्त्रीरोग अस्पताल
- Ministry of Health and Population (Nepal)
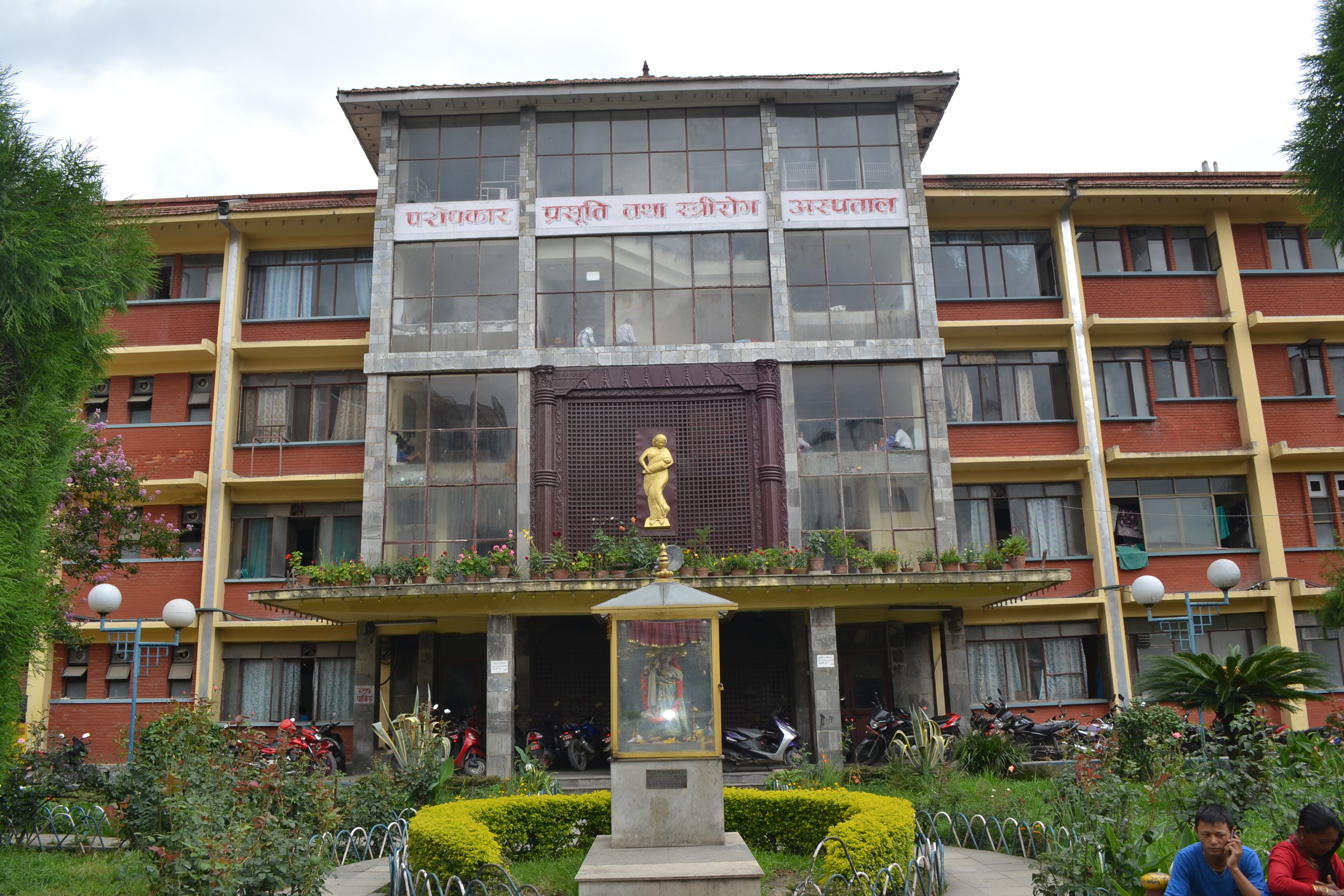

Geography
- Location: Thapathali, Kathmandu, Bagmati, Nepal
- Coordinates: 27.689563°N 85.319052°E

Organisation
- Affiliated university: Ministry of Health and Population (Nepal)

Services
- Beds: 415

History
- Former name: Paropakar Shree Panch Indra Rajya Lakshmi Maternity Hospital
- Opened: 17 August 1959

Links
- Website: www.pmwh.gov.np
- Lists: Hospitals in Nepal

Paropakar Maternity and Women's Hospital, also known as Prasuti Griha (Nepali: प्रसूति गृह), is the first maternity hospital of Nepal. It is located on Maternity Hospital Road, in Thapathali, Kathmandu, Nepal. The hospital was established on 17 August 1959 and has 415 beds. About 15,000 women deliver their babies in this hospital annually.

== History ==
The hospital was started by Paropakar Sansthan, a non-governmental organization at the initiative of Daya Bir Singh Kansakar in the ground of Charburja Palace. The hospital was named by the late King Mahendra (then the Crown Prince) as 'Paropakar Shree Panch Indra Rajya Lakshmi Maternity Hospital' in memory of late Indra Rajya Lakshmi Devi Shah (then Crown Princess), who died after her last pregnancy. On 2 December 2007, the hospital was renamed as Paropakar Maternity & Women's Hospital.

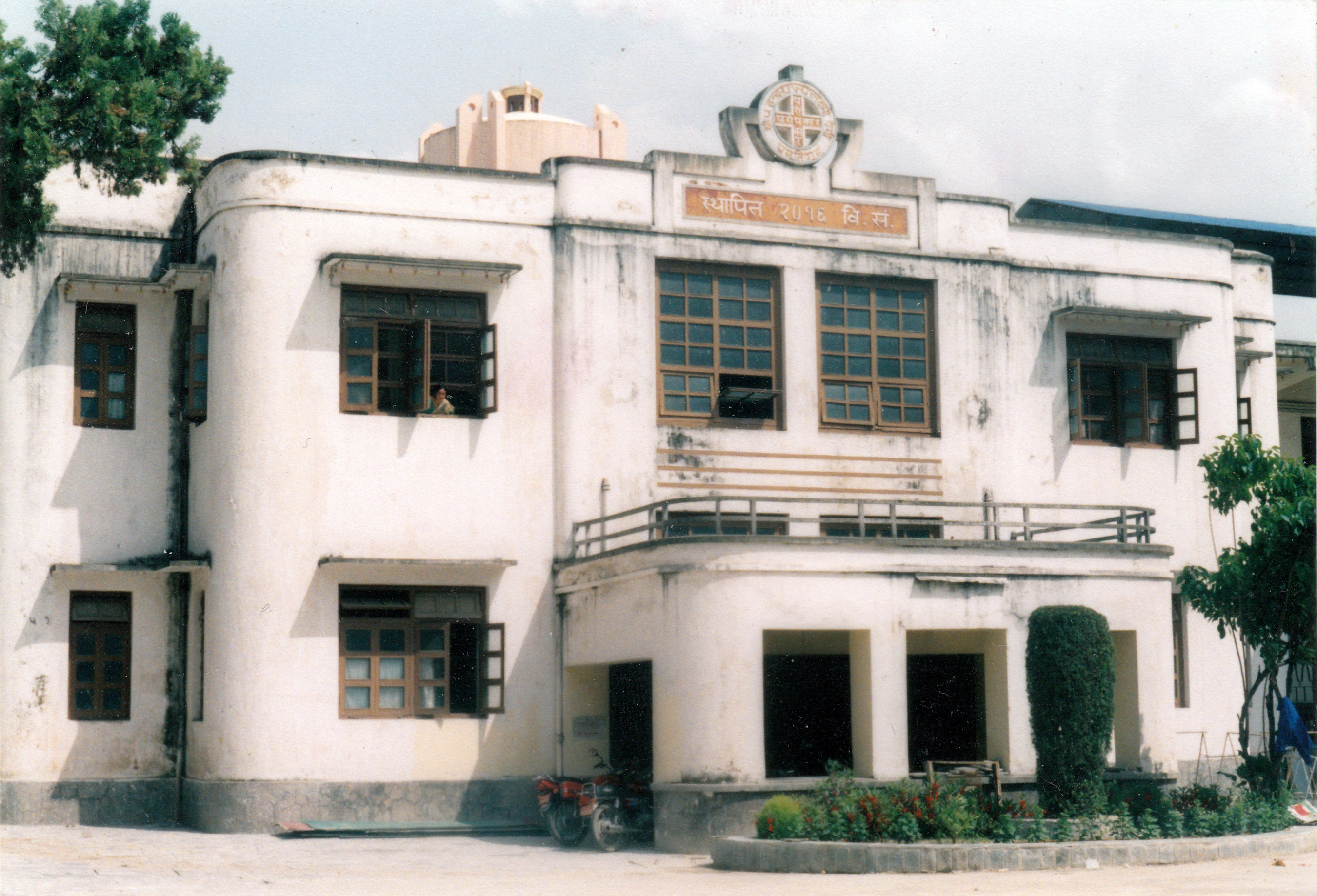
The old hospital.

== Facilities ==
The hospital has 415 beds, of which 336 are allocated to inpatient care; 241 beds are dedicated for obstetrics, 61 for gynaecology and 34 for neonatology, while 79 are service beds.

The hospital employs approximately 50 doctors, 170 nurses, 40 paramedical staff, and 360 administrative, support and other staff. Residential facilities are available for doctors and nurses working in the hospital, and in addition there is a hostel for duty doctors and residents.

The hospital provides the following services:

- Obstetrics and gynaecology
- Neonatology
- Radiology
- Pathology
- Anesthesia

== Notable people born in this hospital ==
- Jigme Khesar Namgyel Wangchuck, the current king of Bhutan
- Two daughters of Princess Shruti of Nepal
- Nalina Chitrakar
