= Pahalman Singh Basnyat =

Nepalese commander

commander Pahalman Singh Basnyat

Shree 1 Maharaja of Khaptad

Military service
- Allegiance: Nepal
- Branch/service: Nepali Army

Pahalman Singh Basnyat was a Nepalese military commander who commanded the Nepali Contingent in the suppression of the Indian Sepoy Mutiny. The Nepalese PM Jung Bahadur Rana was asked for help by the British Raj in dealing with the mutiny, and Basnyat was Brigadier Colonel of the troops deployed from Nepal. He was given the title of Shree 1 Maharaja of Khaptad and was commonly known as Khaptadi Raja.

He was of Khabatari Basnyat lineage. Two of his sons also later became famous commanders in the Nepal Army. Commanding Colonel E Man Singh and Commanding Colonel Lalit Man Singh Bansyat both were senior military officers in Nepal.
