= Narayanhiti Palace Museum =

Museum in Kathmandu, Nepal

Coordinates: 27.7156°N 85.3200°E

- नारायणहिटी दरवार सङ्ग्रहालय (Nepali)
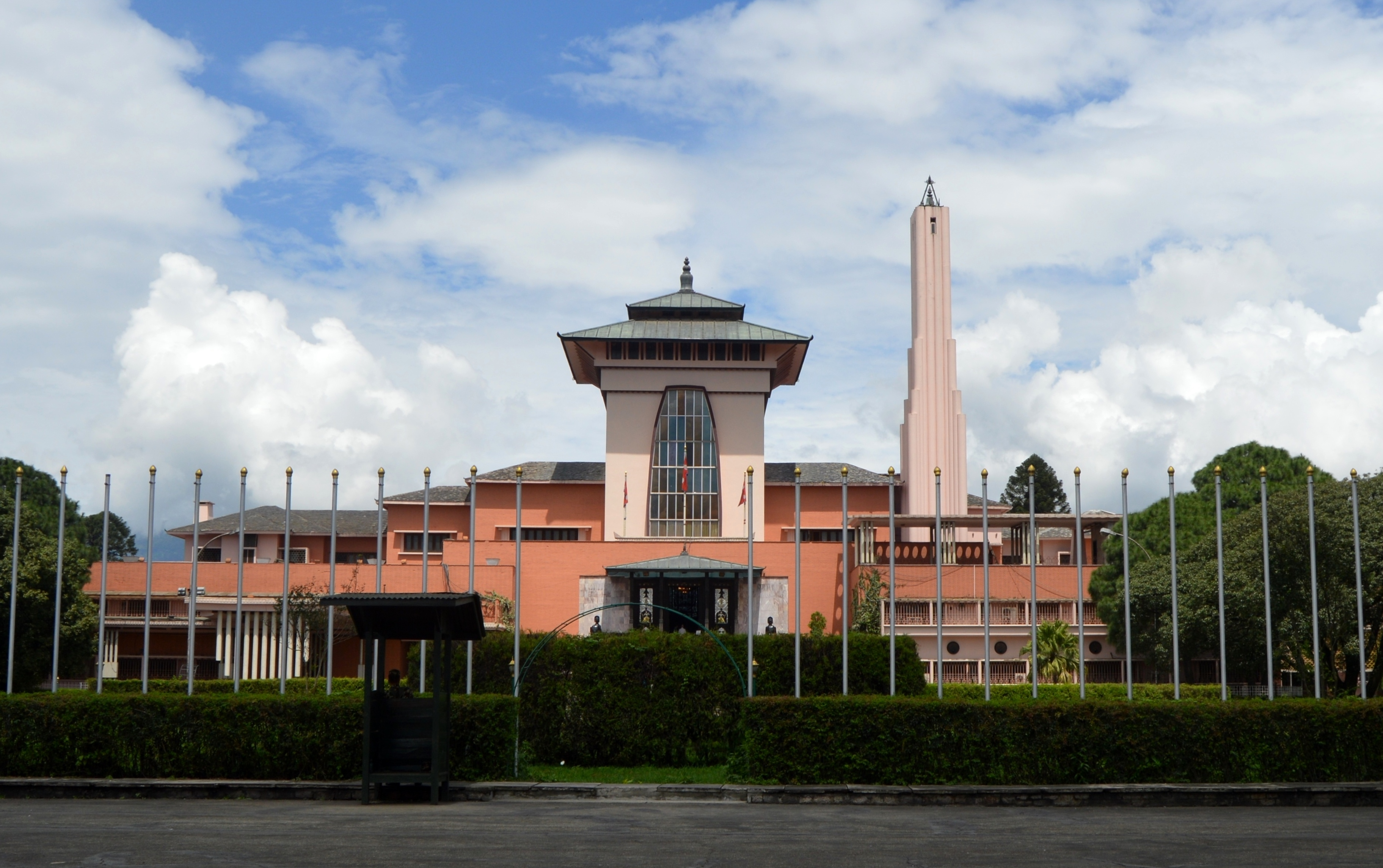
- Interactive map of the Narayanhiti Palace Museum area

General information
- Location: Kathmandu, Nepal
- Construction started: 1963
- Client: Dhokal Singh Basnyat, King Mahendra, Bir Shumsher JBR
- Owner: Government of Nepal

Technical details
- Structural system: Brick and Mortar
- Size: 38 acres (15 ha) or 747.63 ropanis

Design and construction
- Architect: Benjamin Polk

The Narayanhiti Palace Museum (Nepali: नारायणहिटी दरवार सङ्ग्रहालय, romanized: Nārāyaṇahiṭī Daravāra Saṅgrahālaya) is a public museum in Kathmandu, Nepal located east of the Kaiser Mahal and next to Thamel. The museum was created in 2008 from the complex of the former Narayanhiti Palace (or Narayanhiti Durbar) following the 2006 revolution. Before the revolution, the palace was the residence and principal workplace of the monarch of the Kingdom of Nepal, and hosted occasions of state.

The existing palace complex was built by order of King Mahendra in 1963, and incorporates an impressive array of courtyards, gardens and buildings.

== Etymology ==
The name Narayanhiti is a compound of the words Narayana (Sanskrit: नारायण, IAST: Nārāyaṇa), an epithet of the Hindu god Vishnu whose temple is opposite the palace; and hiti (Newar: 𑐴𑐶𑐟𑐶, "water spout"), referring to a traditional stone drinking fountain east of the main entrance which features prominently in local legends.

== History ==
=== Early residences ===
Ownership of the palace site changed multiple times prior to being occupied by the monarchy. Prime Minister Fateh Jung Shah; his father, Choutaria Pran Shah, also lived on the property. Fateh was killed in the Kot massacre on 19 September 1846 and his family was killed or exiled from Kathmandu. Prime Minister Chautariya Pushkar Shah and his family also lived in the area. The area was basically reserved for Chautariya families.

The property and palace was taken over by Colonel Ranodip Singh Kunwar, the brother of Jung Bahadur Rana, who moved into Choutaria's residence after minor renovations. After Ranodip became prime minister in 1877, the complex was renovated and expanded into a lavish multi-wing palace. Ranodip was assassinated during the coup d'état on 22 November 1885 in the palace's southern wing.

=== Royal residence ===
Bir Shumsher Jang Bahadur Rana succeeded Ranodip as Prime Minister and took over the palace. In 1886, Bir Shumsher ordered the old palace demolished, and a new one constructed by architect Jogbir Sthapit as a residence for King Prithvi Bir Bikram Shah, his son-in-law. This moved the royal residence from Hanuman Dhoka Durbar to Narayanhiti.

The palace was damaged in the 1934 Nepal–Bihar earthquake, killing two infant daughters of King Tribhuvan. Colonel Surya Jung Thapa, an engineer, oversaw repairs and renovations which added a new portico and grand staircase.

King Mahendra ordered the palace to be demolished and replaced in 1963. The new palace was designed by American architect Benjamin Polk, who was living in India. Nepalese architecture styles were used to create a national symbol. Construction ended in 1969. Griha Pravesh (a housewarming party) was performed on 27 February 1970 for the wedding of Crown Prince Birendra.

Mahendra declared the palace as king office and property of the Government of Nepal in 1972 . He claimed that the property was the dowry of Queen Divyeshwari, his paternal grandmother.

On 1 June 2001, the royal massacre happened. Among those killed were King Birendra and Queen Aishwarya.

=== Revolution and reuse as a museum ===
The Nepalese monarchy was abolished following the 2006 revolution. The last king, Gyanendra, vacated Narayanhiti on 11 June 2008. The former palace was used to house the new Narayanhiti Palace Museum. The royal crown jewels were put on display in October 2018.

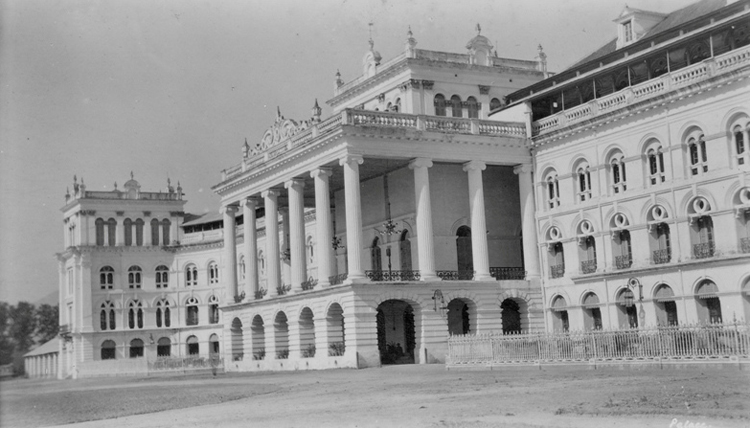
Old Narayanhiti Palace ca 1920, demolished in 1958

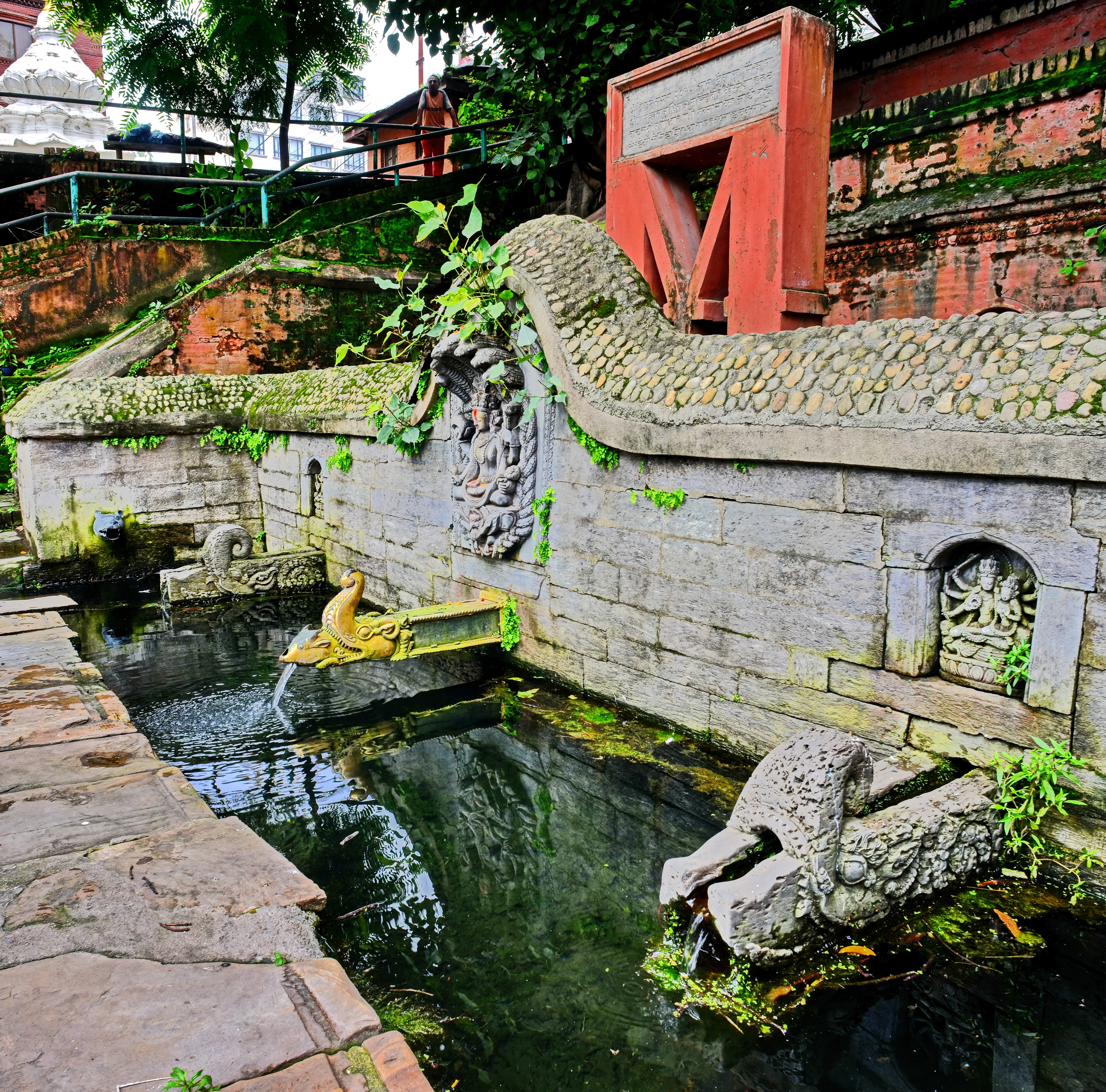
Legendary water spout

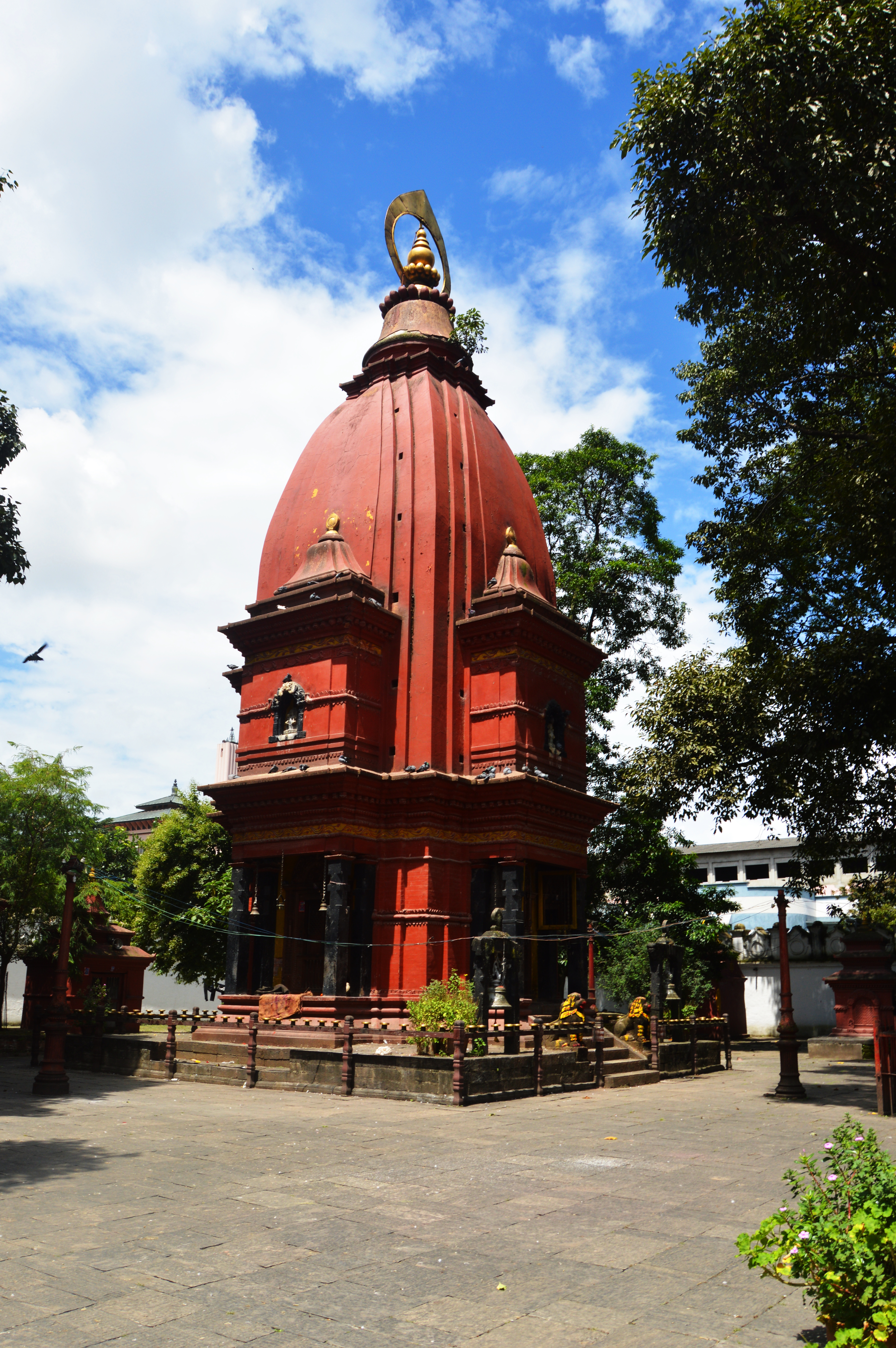
Narayan Mandir on Narayanhiti palace premises

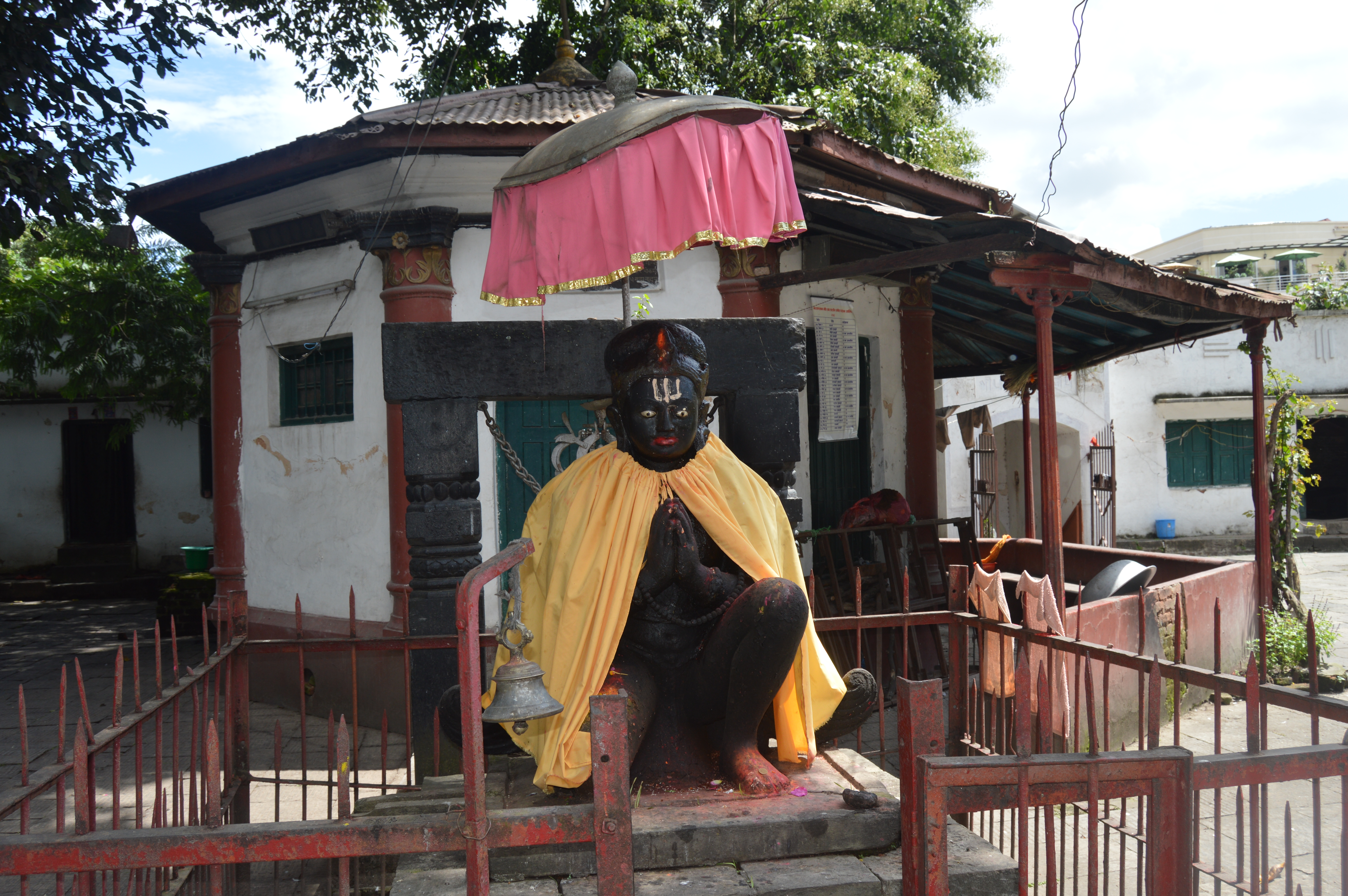
7th Century Garuda outside Narayan Temple in Narayanhiti palace premises

== Grounds ==
=== Design and layout ===
The current Palace was ordered to be renovated by King Mahendra under the design of American architect Benjamin Polk. Some notable spots in the palace include the:

- Gates and boundary walls
- Courtyards and fountains
- Military Barrack
- Helipads
- Garage

Mahendra Manzil

Mahendra Manzil was the palace of King Mahendra Bir Bikram Shah, the son of King Tribhuwan Bir Bikram Shah.

=== Hindu Temple Spire ===
This is the iconic central tower that rises above the palace in the front. The tower is an extension of the Hindu temple beneath it.

=== Garuda ===
The Garuda outside Narayan Mandir in the palace premises is thought to be from Licchavi Period of Nepal.

== Interior ==
The Palace stands on the floor space of 3,794 m^{2} (40838.28 sq ft) and is divided into three parts, the guest wing, the state wing and the private wing. Narayanhiti Palace has 52 rooms called sadan and are named after 75 Districts of Nepal. Interior of the palace is based on Late Victorian style.

=== Reception Hall ===
Reception Hall of Narayanhiti palace is named after Kaski District as Kaski Sadan. The hall is decorated with two full size taxidermy Bengal tiger in charging posture hunted by King Mahendra and King Birendra along with life-size portraits of the Shah Monarchs throughout the stairs by artist Amar Chitrakar. Gaurishankar Gate opens to Kaski Sadan and it is in Kaski Sadan where Shah Monarchs of Nepal gave audience to politicians and perform oath ceremony of Prime Minister and heads of constitutional bodies for Kingdom of Nepal.

=== Throne room ===
The throne room Gorkha Baithak is the center of the palace. It is right above Kaski Baithak. Construction of Gorkha Baithak is based on Hindu temple architect style with a 48-foot chandelier hanging on a 60-foot high Pagoda style ceiling standing on four concrete columns representing Nāga and decorated with Hindu guardian demigods the Astha Matrikas and Ashta Bhairava. It is under this high ceiling that the Throne of the Kingdom of Nepal was placed. It is the room where the monarch, on special occasions, issued royal Royal Proclamations. To the right of the Gorkha Baithak is Dolpa Sadan, used as the room from where people (including members of the royal family) could secretly view the proceedings of the Gorkha Baithak through a one-way viewing mirror.

== Court ceremonies ==
Dhanusha Baithak of the Narayanhiti durbar was where the king used to award decorations. It was used for tika and darshan during Dashain by the royal family and for high level government, military officials and public people.

== See also ==
- Rana palaces of Nepal
- Madan Puraskar Pustakalaya
- Jagadamba Kumari Devi
