= Jogbir Sthapit =

Nepalese architect

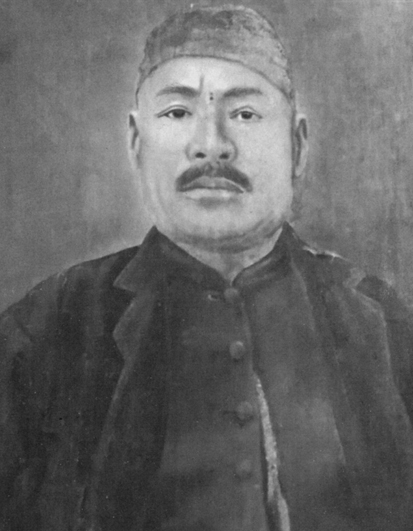
Jogbir Sthapit

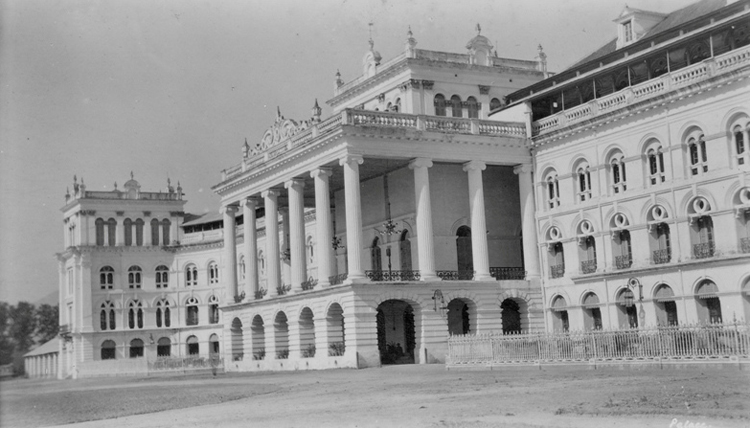
Old Narayanhiti Palace ca. 1920, demolished in 1958.

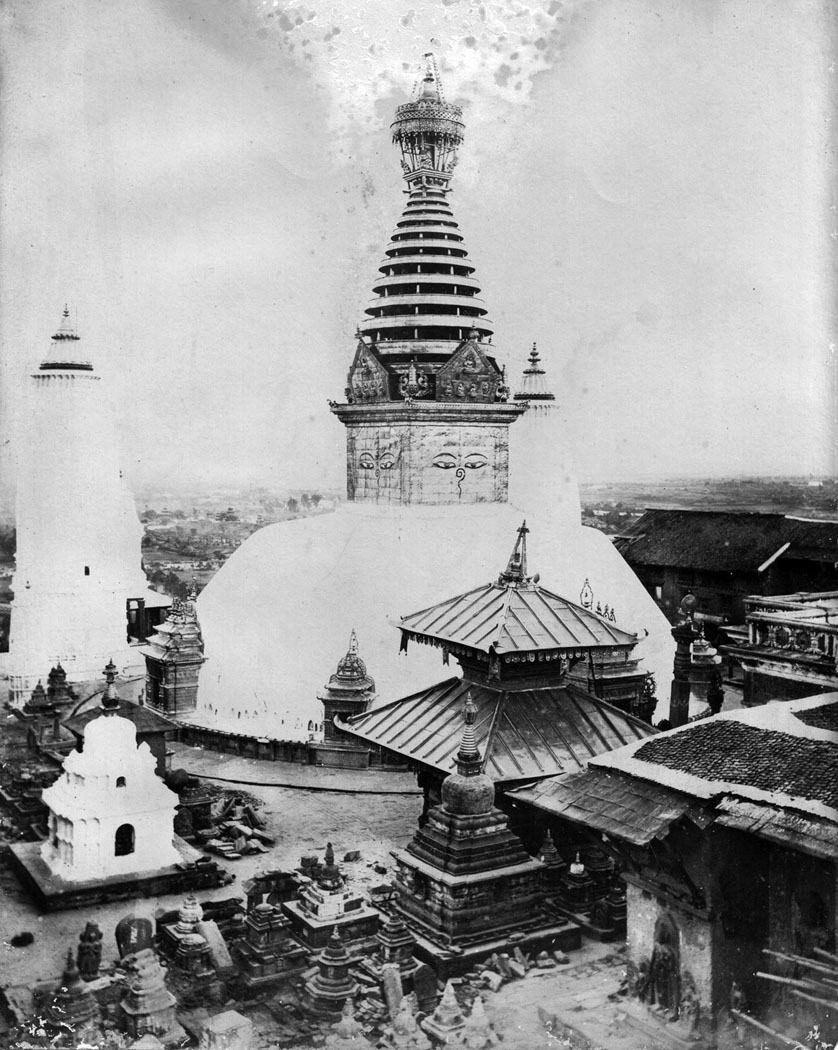
Swayambhu stupa after restoration, ca 1920.

Jogbir Sthāpit (Nepali: जोगवीर स्थापित) (alternative names: Joglāl Sthāpit, Bhāju Mān Sthāpit and Jogbir Nāyo) (1838–1926) was a renowned Nepalese architect best known as the designer of Narayanhiti Royal Palace and renovator of the Swayambhu stupa in Kathmandu. He was a master of both Western and traditional Nepalese building styles.

== Early life ==
Jogbir was born in Kathmandu into the hereditary Newar caste of builders. His family name Sthapit means "establish" in Sanskrit. His father's name was Asha Maru Sthapit and his mother was Jogawati Sthapit. He married Dan Maya after the death of his first wife Gyan Thakun.

Sthapit's ancestral neighborhood Thāymaru is located in the central part of the city.

== Narayanhiti Palace ==
The construction of Narayanhiti Palace in 1886 is among the highlights of Sthapit's career. Narayanhiti was built on the grounds of the palace of Rana prime minister Ranodip Singh Kunwar after it was demolished following his assassination by his nephews in 1885. The new prime minister Bir Shamsher hired Jogbir Sthapit to build a new palace where his uncle's palace once stood. Narayanhiti was then made the royal palace, and Prithvi Bir Bikram Shah became the first king to live in it. Previously, the Shah royal family stayed at Hanuman Dhoka Palace at Kathmandu Durbar Square which was the seat of the old Malla kings.

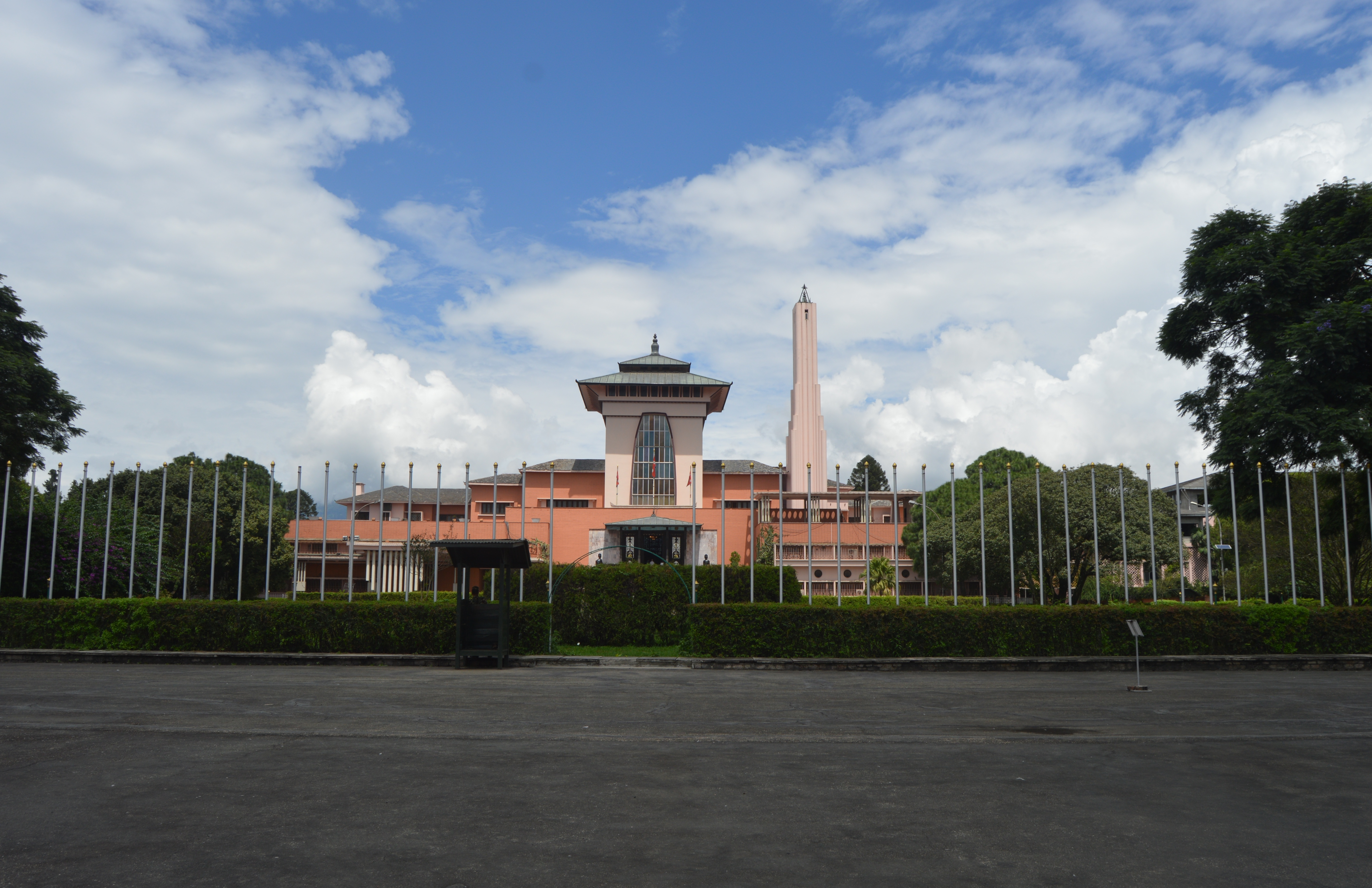
Present Narayanhiti Palace

In 1958, Sthapit's imposing creation was razed to the ground by Prithvi's grandson King Mahendra who started plans for a new palace. Narayanhiti Palace as it looks now was completed in 1969. It was turned into a museum after Nepal became a republic in 2008.

== Swayambhu stupa ==
Sthapit was equally skilled in traditional architecture. And in one of the greatest heritage restoration projects in Nepal which lasted from 1918 to 1921, the Swayambhu stupa was completely redone under his supervision as the chief engineer. The spire was dismantled and rebuilt. The central shaft was renewed. The five Buddha shrines set into the dome were covered with gilt copper, a new statue of Vairocana Buddha was installed, and four new shrines were built to house statues of Tara. A row of prayer wheels were also installed all around the stupa. Trader and philanthropist Dharma Man Tuladhar headed the project and was one of its chief sponsors.

Jogbir Sthapit was also a benefactor and donated to religious causes. He sponsored a special Samyak ceremony, a Buddhist alms-giving festival, in Nepal Era 1018 (1898 AD). It was held at Bhuikhel, a field at the foot of Swayambhu Hill. In Nepal Era 1020 (1900 AD), he erected a votive stupa behind the Ajimā Temple on top of the hill. Its red brick face design is unique amid the large number of stone shrines there.
