= Bir Shumsher Jung Bahadur Rana =

Prime Minister of Nepal from 1885 to 1901

His Highness Commanding General Shree (Note: Repeated thrice) Maharaja Sir Bir Shumsher Jung Bahadur Rana, GCSI
- श्री ३ वीर शमशेर जङ्गबहादुर राणा
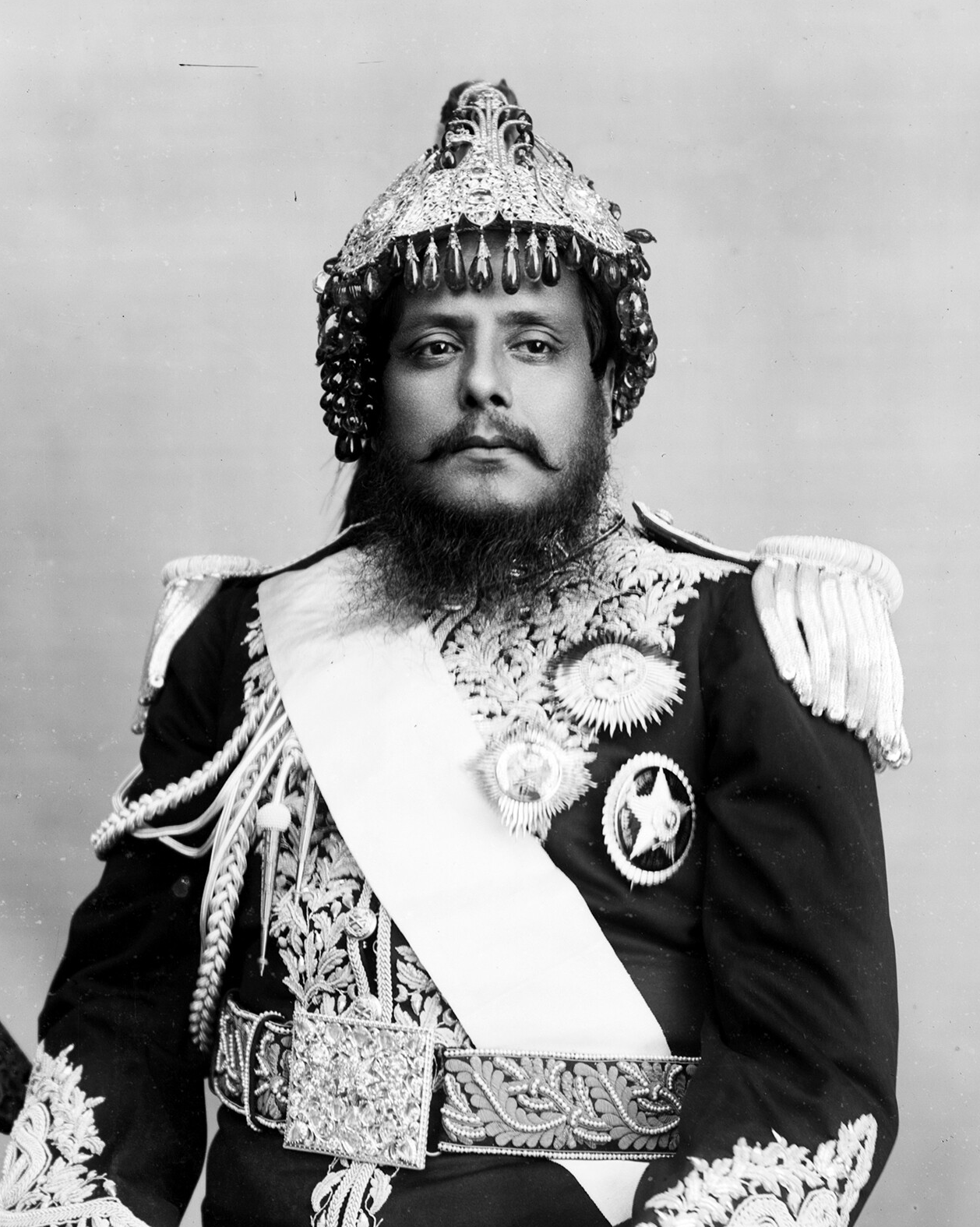
- Bir Shumsher Jung Bahadur Rana

Prime Minister of Nepal
- In office 22 November 1885 – 5 March 1901
- Monarch: King Prithvi
- Preceded by: Renaudip Singh Bahadur
- Succeeded by: Dev Shumsher JBR

Personal details
- Born: 10 December 1852 Kathmandu, Kingdom of Nepal
- Died: 5 March 1901 (age 48) Kathmandu, Kingdom of Nepal
- Spouse: Top Kumari Devi
- Children: Gehendra Shumsher; Rudra Shusher; Maharani Kirti Divyeshwari Rajya Lakshmi Devi; Maharani Durga Divyeshwari Rajya Lakshmi Devi
- Parent: Dhir Shamsher Rana (father)

Commanding General Shree Maharaja Sir Bir Shumsher Jung Bahadur Rana GCSI (10 December 1852 – 5 March 1901) was the 11th Prime Minister of Nepal. He is remembered as a statesman who made reforms and infrastructure improvements. Bir Shamsher Jung Bahadur Rana was known as Kailay in his childhood; this name was given by Jung Bahadur. His mother was daughter of Pahalman Singh Basnyat and sister of Lalitman Singh Basnyat. His mother died at his birth and he was taken care of by Putali Maharani, wife of Jung Bahadur. He spent his childhood at Thapathali Durbar.

== Birth ==
Bir was born to the chief of the Army Dhir Shamsher Jung Bahadur Rana, younger brother of Jung Bahadur Rana. His mother was sister of Iman Singh Basnyat and Lalitman Singh Basnyat and daughter of Pahalman Singh Basnyat. The Nepalese PM Jung Bahadur Rana was asked for help by the British Raj in dealing with the mutiny, and Pahalman Singh Basnyat was Brigadier Colonel of the troops deployed from Nepal. He was given the title of Shree 1 Maharaja of Khaptad and was commonly known as Khaptadi Raja.

== Career ==
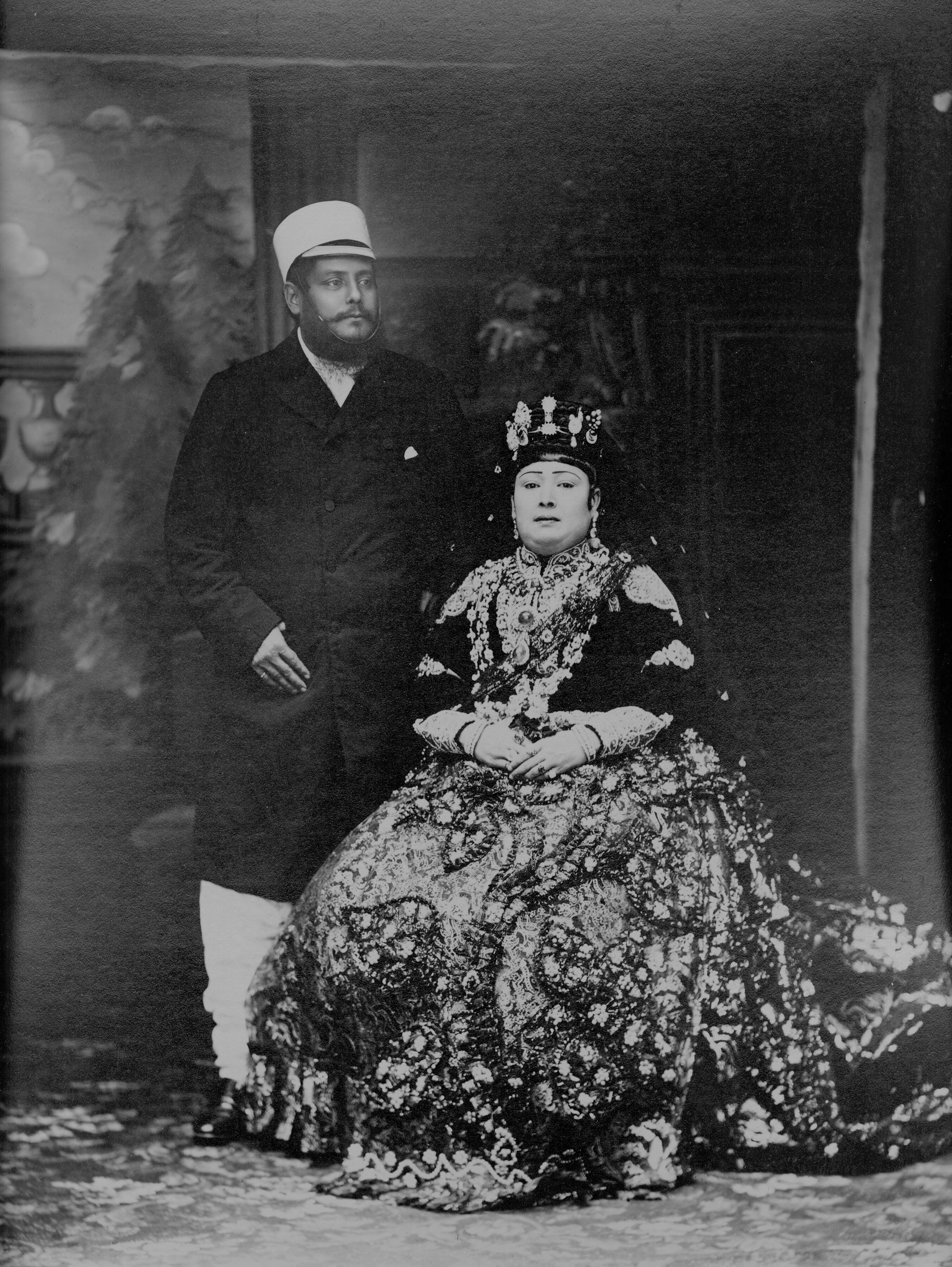
Bir Shumsher with his youngest wife

His uncle Prime minister Renaudip Singh Bahadur was assassinated by his nephews (Khadga Shumsher, Bhim Shumsher, and Dambar Shumsher) during a coup d'état in 1885. Thus he succeeded as Peak minister.

He then served from 1885 to 1901 and was invested as Tung-ling-ping-ma-kuo-kang-wang in 1889. During his tenure, he received Prince Albert Victor, Duke of Clarence, and the ill-fated Archduke Franz Ferdinand. His successor for three months, at his death in 1901, was his progressive brother Deva Shamsher Jung Bahadur Rana.

There were many reforms during Bir Shumsher's time. Water pipes were laid, English was taught in schools and hospitals were built. He reorganized land tax and created a better administrative body. He sent a large number of troops to the British. The British gave him the title of Knight Grand Commander of the Order of the Star of India on Queen Victoria's Diamond Jubilee.

He started a new line of succession to the Prime Ministership of Nepal, excluding all others except the legitimate sons of Dhir Shumsher. He established Durbar High School, Bir Hospital, Bir Tower (Ghanta Ghar), Pathshala (School) and a sanitary system. He provided a good supply of drinking water to the towns of Kathmandu in 1891 and Bhadgaon in 1895. He established the Bir Library for the collection and preservation of valuable books and manuscripts, the postal system was reformed and many roads of Kathmandu were broadened.

Popular Nepali Congress leader Arjun Narasingha KC's great-grandfather, Avivarnaman Singh, married Rana's sister-in-law. Singh was the captain of the Nepali Army and Rana was so appalled by the tall stature and appearance of Captain Khatri that he proposed marriage between his sister-in-law and Singh.

Maharaja Bir Shumsher Jung Bahadur Rana died in 1901, after ruling the country for over 15 years.

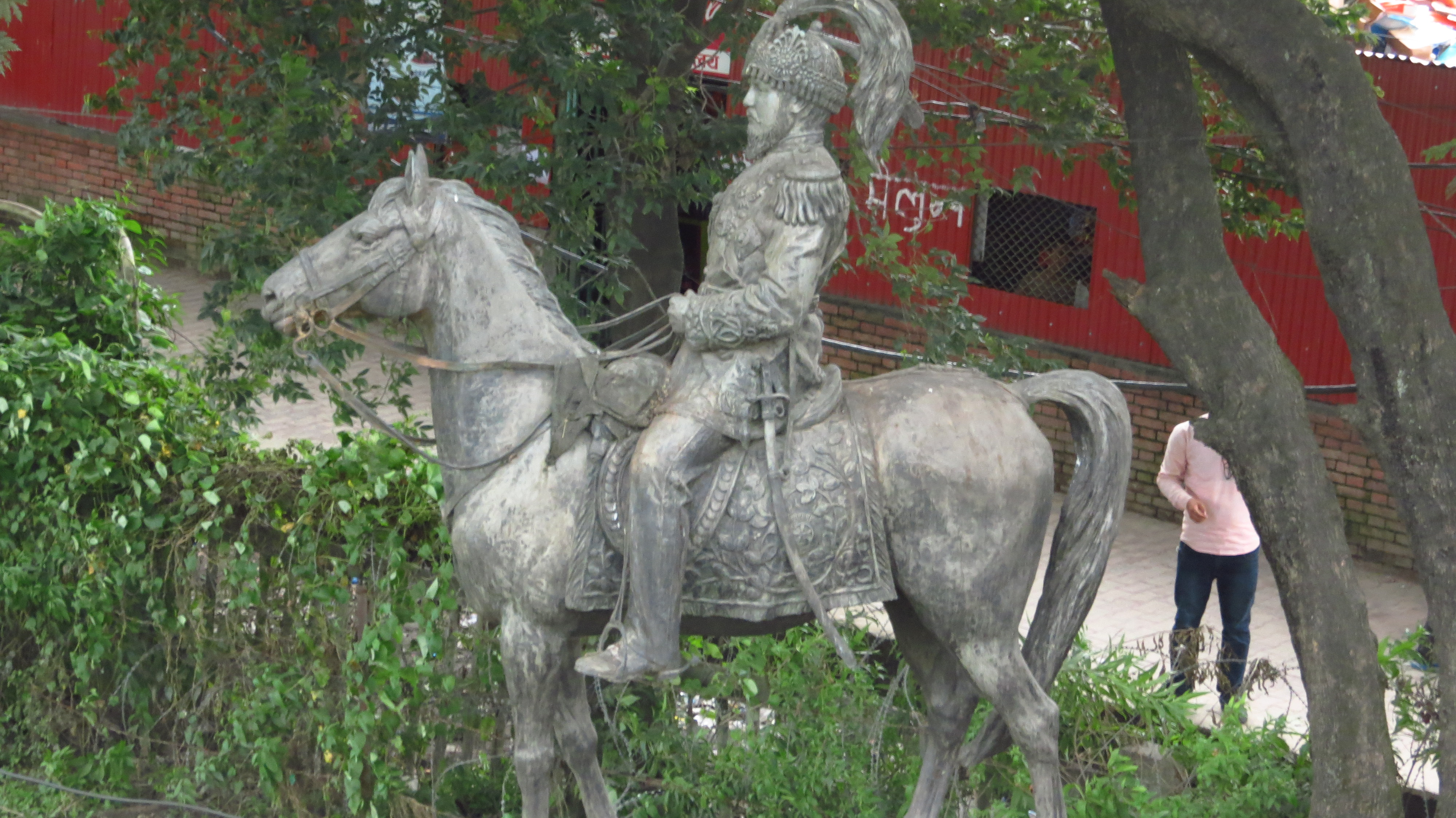
equestrian statue of Bir Shumsher

== Ancestors ==
Ancestors of Bir Shumsher Jung Bahadur Rana

16. Ramakrishna Kunwar
8. Ranajit Kunwar
4. Bal Narsingh Kunwar
2. Dhir Shumsher Rana
20. Amar Singh Thapa (sanukaji)
10. Nain Singh Thapa
21. Satyarupa Maya
5. Ganesh Kumari Thapa
22. Ranajit Pande
11. Rana Kumari Pande
1. Bir Shumsher Jung Bahadur Rana
6. Pahalman Singh Basnyat
3. sister of Lalit Mansingh Basnyat

== Notes ==
Political offices
Preceded by Renaudip Singh Bahadur	Prime Minister of Nepal; 1885–1901	Succeeded by Dev Shumsher JBR
