= Thapathali Durbar =

Coordinates: 27.691111°N 85.315833°E

- थापाथली दरवार
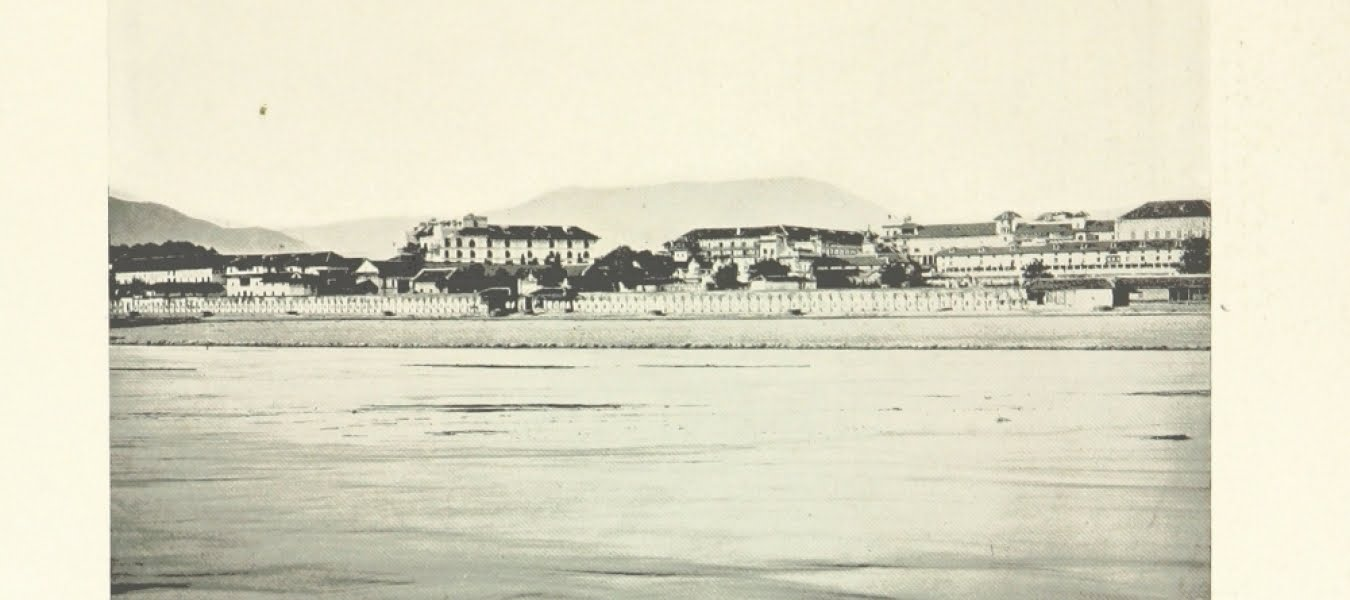
- Interactive map of the Thapathali Durbar area

General information
- Architectural style: Fusion of Mughal and European styles of architecture
- Location: Kathmandu, Nepal
- Cost: Unknown
- Client: Nain Singh Thapa (Thapa dynasty), Jung Bahadur Rana

Technical details
- Structural system: Brick and Mortar
- Size: 80 ropanis

Design and construction
- Architect: later additions by Ranasur Bista

Thapathali Durbar (Nepali: थापाथली दरवार) was a palace complex in Kathmandu, the capital of Nepal. Thapathali means abode of the Thapas. It was initially built by Nain Singh Thapa of the Thapa dynasty but was later occupied by Jung Bahadur Rana, as prime minister, the executive head of Nepal. The palace complex, located north of the Bagmati river, consists of a large number of courtyards, gardens, and buildings.

== History ==
The palace complex lay in the heart of Kathmandu, to the north of the bagmati river. The history of the palace is closely linked with the history of Nepal and its rulers.

=== Under Thapa dynasty ===
Nain Singh Thapa was credited with initiating construction of the palace complex.

=== Under Rana dynasty ===
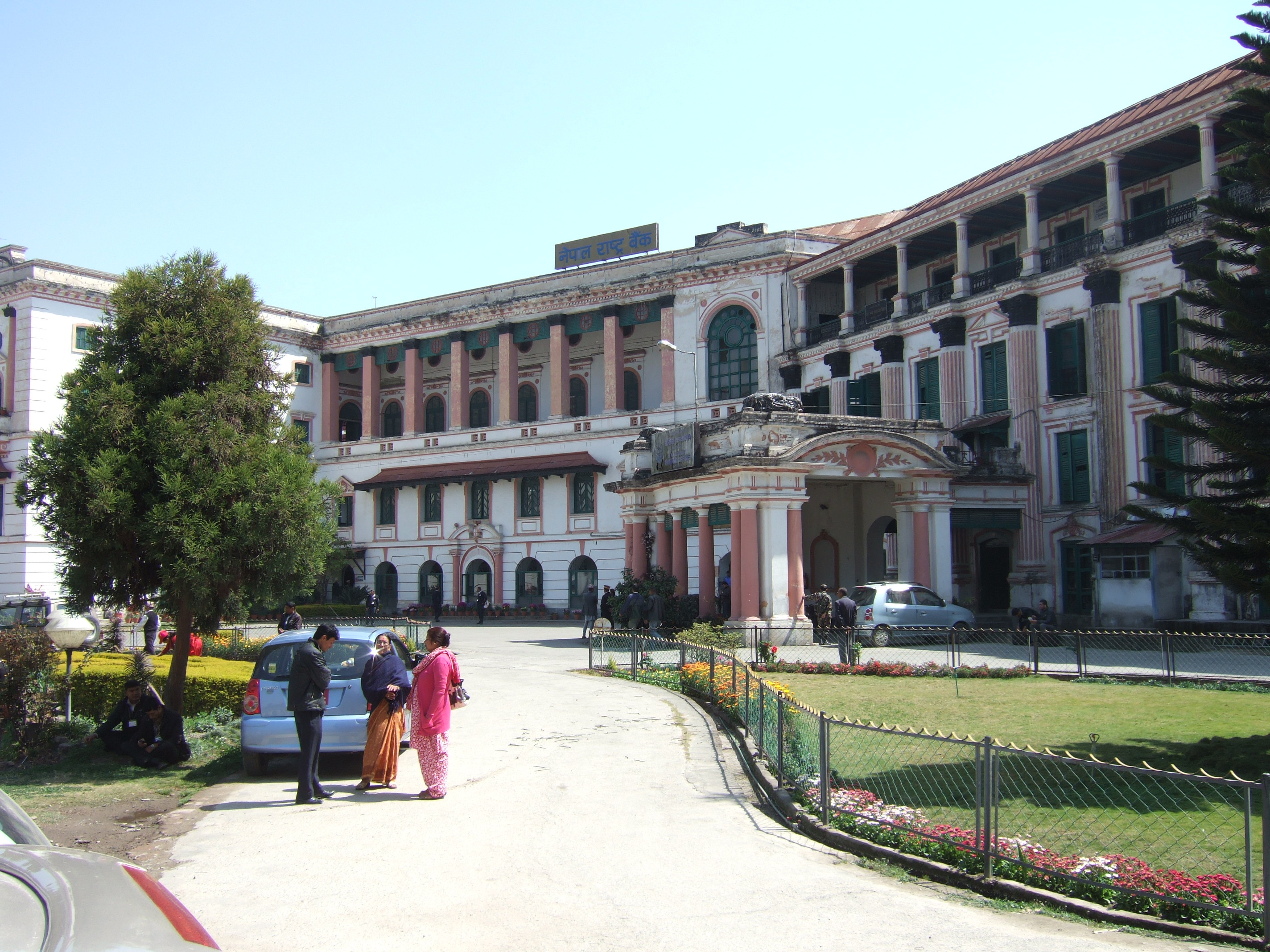
Singha Mahal initially built by Jung Bahadur Rana and later named Singha Mahal by Singha Shumsher.

In 1887, Juddhapratap Jung was murdered by the Shumsher Ranas. Chandra Shumsher JBR captured Thapathali Durbar and occupied it for 18 years until 1904. After Chandra Shumsher's death, his son Singha Shumsher JBR inherited and renamed the complex to Singha Mahal.

== Singha Mahal ==
After Chandra Shumsher's death, his son Singha Shumsher JBR inherited the Thapathali Durbar Complex and named it Singha Mahal. Singha mahal is currently occupied by Nepal Rastra Bank.

== Kal mochan temple ==
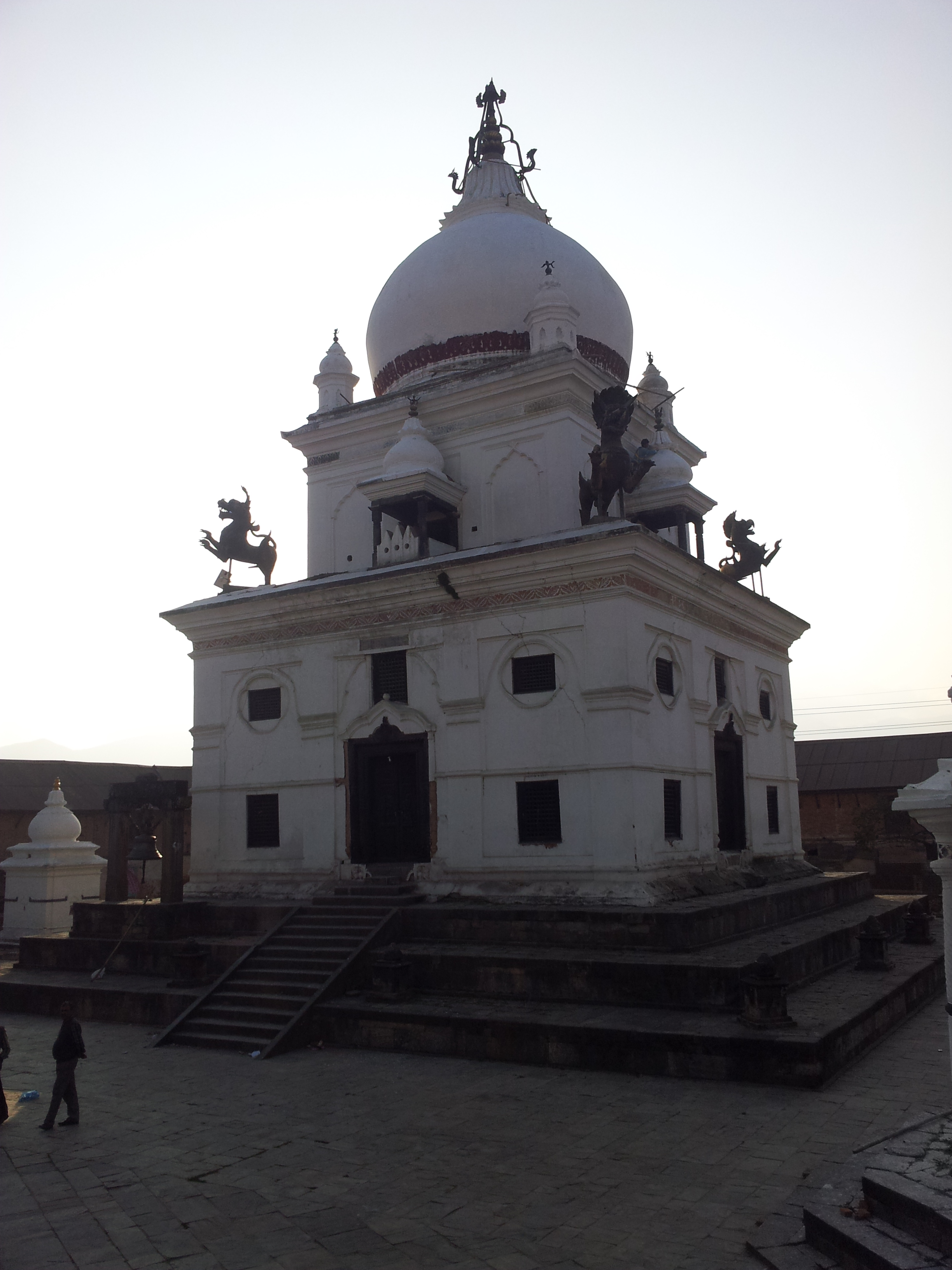
Kalmochan Temple

Kalmochan temple, dedicated to the Hindu god Lord Vishnu the preserver, was a part of the Durbar complex. It was built around the mid-19th century outside the walls. It was built in the Moghul Kathmandu-Gothic architecture style and has Mughal art and Nepali art. It is also known as Janga Hiranya Hemnarayan mandir. It is located at kalmochan ghat in Thapathali. It was built by Rana prime minister Jung Bahadur Rana. He named it after his two wives Hiranya Garbha and Hem, whereas Narayan means god Bishnu. He built this temple to attain inner peace (mochan) as he was involved in many murders. It is believed that Jung Bahadur Rana had buried the dead bodies of people who died in Kot (Arsenal) Parva (massacre) under this temple.

The April 2015 earthquake of Nepal reduced this temple to rubble. The temple was not in good shape for quite some time. The visual scars were evident in this structure, a large shear crack on the eastern wall and along edges of the roof after 2011 Sikkim earthquake of India. The entire Kalmochan Ghat is in a dilapidated situation after the last quake.

== See also ==
- Bhimsen Thapa
- Mathabarsingh Thapa
- Jung Bahadur Rana
