= Mathabarsingh Thapa =

7th Mukhtiyar of Nepal (1798–1845)

Shri Mukhtiyar General Saheb Mathabar Singh Thapa
- माथवरसिंह थापा
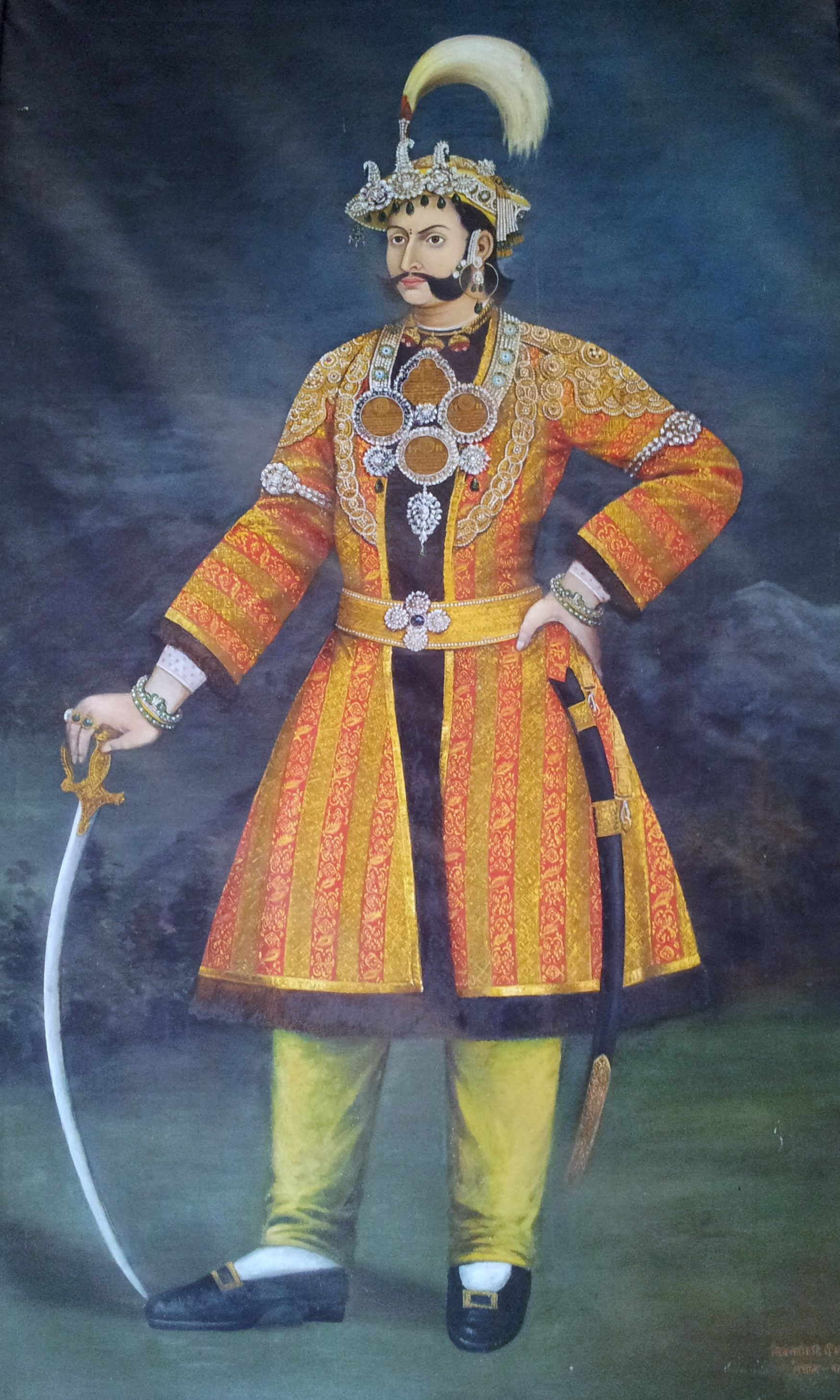
- Portrait of Mathabar Singh Thapa

Prime Minister of Nepal
- In office 1 January 1845 – 17 May 1845
- Monarch: Rajendra Bikram Shah
- Preceded by: Position established
- Succeeded by: Fateh Jung Shah

Mukhtiyar of Nepal
- In office 25 December 1843 – 1 January 1845
- Monarch: Rajendra Bikram Shah
- Preceded by: Fateh Jung Shah
- Succeeded by: Himself as Prime Minister

Commander-In-Chief of the Nepali Army
- In office 25 December 1843 – 17 May 1845
- Preceded by: Rana Jang Pande
- Succeeded by: Jung Bahadur Rana

Personal details
- Born: 1798 A.D. Borlang, Nepal
- Died: 17 May 1845 (aged 46–47) Kathmandu, Nepal
- Cause of death: Assassinated
- Children: 3 sons, Rannojjwal Singh Thapa; Bikram Singh Thapa; Amar Singh Thapa II
- Parents: Nain Singh Thapa (father); Rana Kumari Pande (mother)
- Relatives: Thapa family; Pande family; Kunwar family
- Education: Private tutoring
- Nickname: Kala Bahadur

Military service
- Allegiance: Kingdom of Nepal
- Branch/service: Nepali Army
- Rank: General
- Unit: Singha Nath Battalion
- Battles/wars: Anglo-Nepalese War

Mathabar Singh Thapa (Note: Also spelled Mathbar, Mathawar, Mathavar, additionally called Matabar Singh Thapa (Nepali: मातवरसिंह थापा).) (1798 – 17 May 1845), was a Nepalese statesman, administrator, and Commander-in-Chief who served as Mukhtiyar of the Kingdom of Nepal from 25 December 1843 to 1 January 1845. (Note: Mukhtiyar is translated as Chief Authority and was roughly equivalent to a Prime Minister or Head of Government.) He later abolished the position of Mukhtiyar and established the office of Prime Minister, serving in that role from 1 January 1845 until his assassination on 17 May 1845. (Note: His coronation of Premiership was the first in Nepal thereby making him the First Prime Minister and Commander-in-chief of Nepal as many of his predecessors bore the same position but not the title.) He also served as Commander-in-Chief of the Nepali Army throughout his tenure. He belonged to the noble Thapa family and was assassinated by his own nephew, Jung Bahadur Rana, through multiple gunshots while he was asleep.

Mathbar Singh Thapa was the nephew of Mukhtiyar Bhimsen Thapa, who was imprisoned on a false accusation of killing King Rajendra Bikram Shah’s six-month-old son. After Bhimsen Thapa's imprisonment on 18 May 1839, Mathabar Singh Thapa fled to Shimla to avoid possible execution due to his family ties.

Four years later, Queen Rajya Lakshmi Devi, the second wife of King Rajendra Bikram Shah, called him back and appointed him Mukhtiyar, paving the way for him to later assume the title of Prime Minister.

However, Mathabar Singh Thapa angered the queen by refusing to support her son Ranendra Bir Bikram Shah's claim to the throne. In response, the queen conspired against him, and he was assassinated by his own nephew, Jung Bahadur Rana, effectively marking the decline of the Thapa dynasty.

== Birth ==
Not much is known of Mathabar Singh Thapa's childhood. He was born in Borlang, Gorkha. He was the son of Kaji Nayan Singh Thapa who was killed in the war against the Kingdom of Kangra. He was a nephew of Bhimsen Thapa and also the maternal uncle of Jang Bahadur Rana. Through his mother's side, he was the grandson of Kaji Ranajit Pande, who was the son of Kaji Tularam Pande. Kaji Tularam Pande was a cousin of Kaji Kalu Pande.

== Early life ==
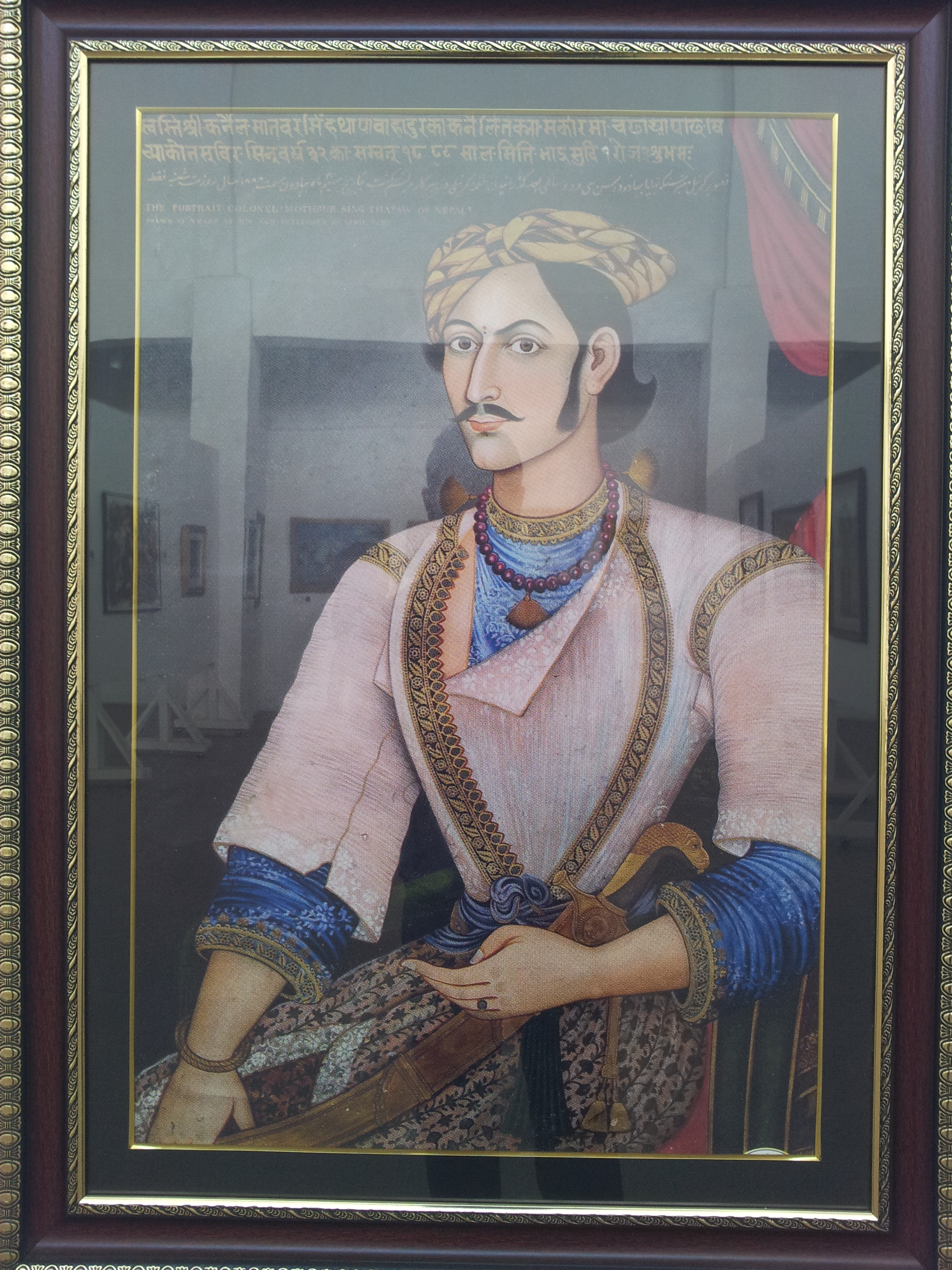
Portrait of Colonel Mathabar Singh Thapa (1831)

=== Failed mission to Britain ===
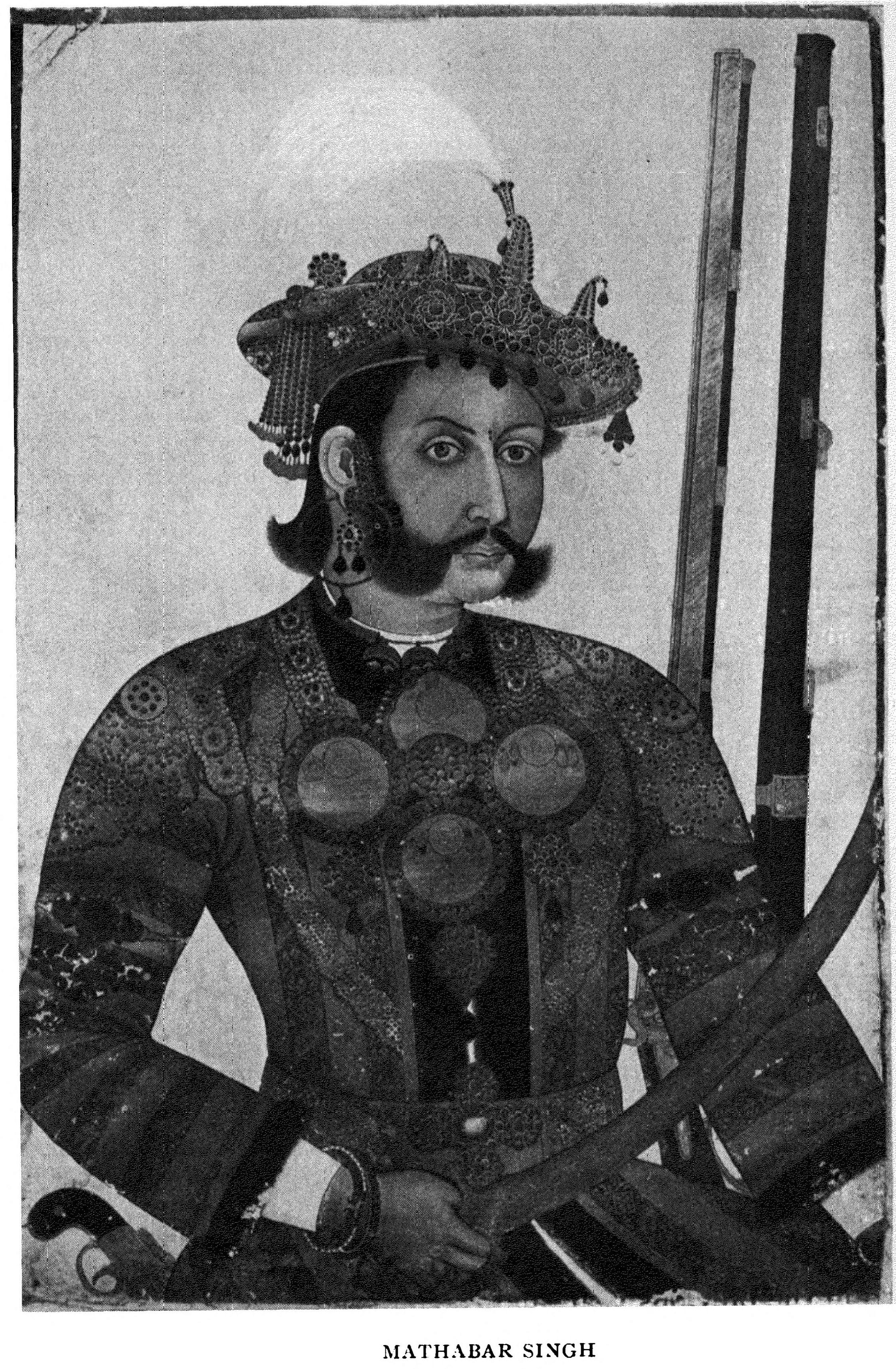
Mathabarsingh Thapa

A royal letter was received from the Maharaja Ranjit Singh, ruler of Sikh Empire in Punjab, addressed to King Rajendra. The Nepalese court seized this opportunity to establish diplomatic contact with Punjab as well as other states such as Burma and Gwalior. In April 1835, Bhimsen Thapa, hoping to force Britain to acknowledge the sovereignty of Nepal, chose his nephew Colonel Mathabar Singh Thapa as the representative of Nepal, bearing a few gifts and a letter from King Rajendra addressed to King William IV. The idea was initially received favorably by Brian Houghton Hodgson as well as the Governor-General, who hoped that the mission could increase the trust between the two nations. In this process, Mathabar Singh was promoted to Chota General; Ranbir Singh Thapa, the governor of Palpa, was made Full General; and Mathabar's nephew, the sixteen-year-old Sherjung Thapa, was made Commanding Colonel. Both Rajendra and Samrajya Laxmi were also pleased with this plan, and on 1 November 1835, Bhimsen was conferred the title of Commander-in-Chief. On 27 November 1835, Mathabar Singh left Kathmandu with a retinue of two thousand men, including 200 officers and 600 soldiers, for London via Calcutta.

Mathabar was given a grand welcome in Calcutta by the acting Governor-General Charles Metcalfe; and while there, Mathabar started to indulge in needless luxuries and show offs. Meanwhile, Hodgson sent a secret letter to Metcalfe asking him not to allow Mathabar to make a state visit to Britain. Hence, Metcalfe was only willing to grant him the visa of an ordinary traveler, and not the diplomatic visa of a state representative. Mathabar thus returned to Nepal in March 1836, having wasted a vast sum of money, without accomplishing any of his goals. The deliberate sabotage of Mathabar's mission was Hodgson's diplomatic attack against Bhimsen. Mathabar Singh spent a sum of one lakh and fifty thousand in Calcutta on the fruitless mission. Mathabar's extravagant expenditure was also heavily criticized by Queen Samrajya Lakshmi Devi, since at that time the state coffer was in dire condition; and to pacify her, Bhimsen had to reimburse the extra expenses from his own pockets.

=== Poisoning Case ===
On 24 July 1837, Rajendra's youngest son, Devendra Bikram Shah, an infant of six months, died suddenly. It was at once rumored that the child had died of poison intended for his mother the Senior Queen Samrajya Laxmi Devi: given at the instigation of Bhimsen Thapa, or someone of his party. On this charge, Mathbar Singh with his family, the court physicians, Ekdev and Eksurya Upadhyay, and his deputy Bhajuman Baidya, with a few more of the nearest relatives of the Thapas were incarcerated, proclaimed outcasts, and their properties confiscated.

=== Acquittal & Release ===
Fearful that the Pandes would re-establish their power, Fatte Jang Shah, Ranganath Poudel, and the Junior Queen Rajya Laxmi Devi obtained from the King the liberation of Bhimsen, Mathabar, and the rest of the party, about eight months after they were incarcerated for the poisoning case. Some of their confiscated land, as well as the Bagh Durbar, was also returned. Upon his release, the soldiers loyal to Bhimsen crowded behind him in jubilation and followed him up to his house; a similar treatment was given to Mathabar Singh and Sherjung Thapa.

=== Exile to India ===
In January 1838, King Rajendra of Nepal promoted Rana Jang Pande to the post of Commander in the armed force and his brother Karbir Pande as Kapardar ("Palace Chief Guard"). As a result, almost one hundred officers and soldiers resigned from the Singha Nath Battalion, openly calling themselves as the private followers of Mathawar Singh which showcased the popularity of Mathawar Singh in the military forces. Around October 1838, Ranganath Poudel, finding himself unsupported by the King, resigned from the Mukhtiyari, which was then conferred on Pushkar Shah; but Pushkar Shah was only a nominal head, and the actual authority was bestowed on Ranjang Pande. Sensing that a catastrophe was going to befall the Thapas, Mathabar Singh fled to India while pretending to go on a hunting trip.

== Rise to Power ==
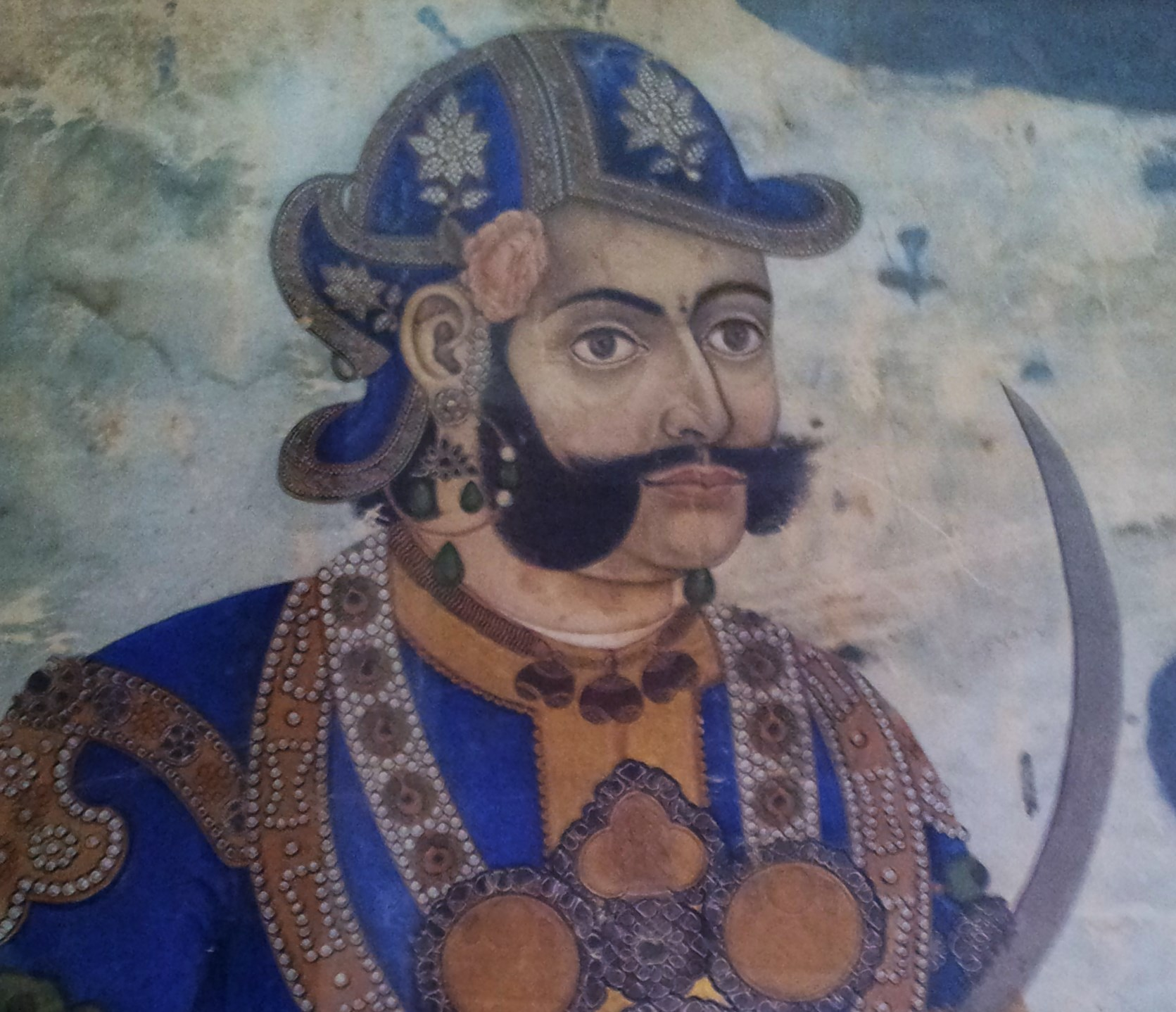
Portrait of Mathabar Singh Thapa in National Museum of Nepal, Chhauni

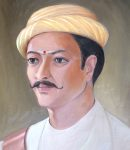
Rana Jang Pande, the leader of Pande family

Mathabar Singh Thapa had exiled to India when Bhimsen Thapa was maliciously accused to be guilty of murdering the King Rajendra's son who was 6 months old. After assigning administrative authority to Junior Queen Rajya Laxmi Devi by King Rajendra Bikram Shah in January 1843, she immediately asked Mathabar Singh to return to Nepal, to which Mathabar Singh left Shimla to stop at Gorakhpur for detailed study of political situation of Nepal. Mathabar Singh's nephew Kaji Jung Bahadur Kunwar was sent to persuade his uncle after which he arrived in Kathmandu Valley in April 1843. Historian Balchandra Sharma writes that Mathabar Singh arrived on 17 April 1843 where a great welcome was organized for him. Mathawar Singh living in a public rest house, constantly urged that he would not enter his residence in Kathmandu until the framed charges against his family be released. In July 1843, the case was re-discussed at the Bharadari Sabha (Council) in front of King Rajendra and Queen Rajya Laxmi, where Thapa family were declared innocent and their confiscated properties were restored. It was also declared that the poisoning case was framed by the Kala Pandes. Mathawar Singh poisoned the already insane Rana Jang Pande after publicly disgracing him. He also ordered the death penalty to two brothers of Rana Jang and four other persons which included Devi Bahadur Kunwar. In the event, Kulachandra Shah was banished while Krishna Ram Mishra was exiled. The properties the above-mentioned persons together with other 40 persons who fled the event were confiscated. In November 1843, Mathabar Singh became Mukhtiyar as well as Minister and Commander-In-Chief of the Nepalese Army by the second queen of Rajendra, Queen Rajya Laxmi who had ambitions of making her own son, Prince Ranendra as the king of Nepal, with Mathabar Singh's help. Though he was declared Mukhtiyar and as well as Minister and Commander-In-Chief in November 1843, his appointment letter was issued only on Aswin Badi 7, 1901 (i.e. September 1844):

From King Rajendra,
To Mathbar Singh Thapa Bahadur, son of Nain Singh Thapa, grandson of Ambar Singh Thapa, resident of Gorkha.

We hereby appoint you as Mukhtiyar of all civil and administrative affairs throughout our country, as well as Prime Minister, Commander-In-Chief and General with Jagir emoluments amounting to Rs 12,401. Remain in attendance during the war and other occasions as commanded by us, be faithful to our salt and utilize the following lands and revenues as your Jagir with due loyalty.
(Particulars of lands and revenue follow).
Aswin Badi 7, 1901
(September 1844)

— Appointment of Mathbar Singh Thapa as Prime Minister by Baburam Acharya

== Consolidation of Power ==
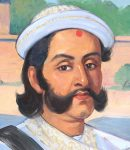
Thapa Kaji Mathabar Singh's painting from the Prime Minister's office

Before he was made the Minister and the Commander-In-Chief, he had led to the murder of almost all of his enemies and political adversaries. Having seen the fall of Bhimsen Thapa, he believed that having a personal army would prevent his own downfall; so he founded three regiments dedicated to him and only him. He built army barracks around his house for his personal protection. For this, he used the army like slaves, prompting the British Resident Minister Sir Henry Lawrence to advise him not to do so. However, too over-confident in his power, Mathabar Singh Thapa ignored him. He even claimed that he would be the first prime minister since the time of Prithvi Narayan Shah to die of old age and not out of the conspiracy. In 1845 January 4, he declared himself as the "Prime Minister of Nepal". This was the first time anyone had been titled "Prime Minister" in the history of Nepal. All the others before him were either titled as Mukhtiyar or Mul Kajis. It is believed that at that time he had become even more powerful than the King of Nepal. His power and over-influence in the Nepalese politics and even in the personal life of the monarchy itself led to the eclipse of his power and his downfall by the hands of Jang Bahadur Rana.

== Downfall ==
When Mathabar Singh Thapa declined the Queen's request to help her make her own son king, the Queen joined those against him and plotted his downfall. But just to appease him, he was provided the title of "Prime Minister" while conspiracy to murder him was going on behind. Finally, when all the preparations for his murder were made, he was called to the Royal Palace at night, informing him incorrectly, that the Queen had been ill from some disease. Though he was warned by his own son, and his mother, he went to the palace. When he was sleeping Jang Bahadur was hiding under his bed. He was shot multiple times on his back from under the bed by Jang Bahadur Rana where he immediately died. The next day King Rajendra declared that he had himself killed Mathabar Singh Thapa accusing him of several activities that he had done to undermine his own (Rajendra's) power.

== Aftermath ==
The murder of Mathabar Singh Thapa led to the political instability in Nepal. Though, Fatte Jung Shah was declared the Prime Minister (1845 September 23), Gagan Singh had more regiments (7) of the army under him and was more powerful. Jung Bahadur Rana also had 3 regiments under him. Fatte Jungh Shah himself had 3 regiments of the army under his control. Also Gagan Singh had the special support of the queen Rajya Laxmi Devi. British Resident Sir Henry Lawrence once mentioned that, "If there is struggle for power, that struggle will be between Gagan Singh and Jung Bahadur." Ultimately, the extreme power of Gagan Singh led to him being assassinated by King Rajendra and Prime Minister Fatte Jungh Shah in 1846 September 14 at 10 P.M.. The assassination of Gagan Singh led to the Kot massacre and ultimately, the rise of Jung Bahadur Rana.

== Legacy ==
Mathabarsingh Thapa was the first prime minister of Nepal to wear a crown. The 104 year-ruling Rana Dynasty was also related to him.

== Family ==
He had following sons as per various sources:

- Ranojjwal Singh Thapa
- Col. Amar Singh Thapa
- Rana Abal Singh Thapa
- Ransor Singh Thapa (Not to be confused with son of Amar Singh Thapa - Ranajor Singh Thapa)

== Land Grants ==
The land grants received by Mathbar Singh Thapa on various dates were:

Number	Particulars	Location	Area (muris/bighas)	Estimated Income (NRs.) (Note: The figure in the journal shows Rs./Aana as used in ancient monetary measurements in Nepal. 1 Aana was equivalent to 1/16th of Nepalese Rupee. Similar to Indian Anna.)	Granted Date (V.S.)
1	Residential site	Ganabahal, Kathmandu	194.25 muris	194.25	Shrawan Sudi 8, 1882
2	Rice fields	Lubhu, Patan	261.25 muris	440.81	Shrawan Sudi 8, 1882
3	Rice fields granted for endowment as Guthi for the Sri Bhagawati temple	Madi, Palpa	200.00 muris	50.00	Kartik Badi 3, 1891
4	Land granted as Guthi for the Sri Bhimeshwar temple	Palpa	not given	62.50	Falgun Badi 4, 1900
5	Bartung village in Palpa, granted for endowment as Guthi for the Sri Ambar Narayan temple	Bartung village, Palpa	not given	50.00	Falgun Badi 4, 1900
6	Waste lands adjoining Prime Minister Mathbar Singh Thapa's gardens	Sundhara, Kathmandu	41 muris	4.00	Baisakh Badi 7, 1901
7	Cultivated lands in the Parganna of Koradi	Aurahi, Mahottari	200 bighas	1113.11	Shrawan Badi 3, 1901
8	Rice-fields in Bhadgaun	Bhaktapur, Bhaktapur district	680 muris	967.31	Shrawan Badi 3, 1901
9	Villages of Sanupalati, Thulopalati, Kipchya, Jharlang, Sindhu, Tabe and Aginchok	Various	not given	4,062.77	Shrawan Badi 3, 1901
10	Rice-fields granted for endowment as Guthi for the Sri Bhimamukteshwar temple	Various (Kathmandu, Kirtipur, Godavari)	1300 muris	1300	Shrawan Sudi 3, 1901
11	Lands in Mahottari	Mahottari	6501 bighas	26,004.00	Poush Sudi 5, 1901
12	Thums at Chaurasi, Palanchok and various others	various	not given	4,281.00+1619.25+599.75	Poush Sudi 5, 1901
13	Lands in Saptari and Bara districts	Saptari and Bara district	9,001 bighas	36,004.00	Falgun Badi 6, 1901
14	Lands in Rautahat and Bara districts	Rautahat and Bara district	9,644 bighas	38,576.00	Falgun Sudi 1, 1901
15	Sikarbesi village	Sikarbesi, Nuwakot district	not given	35.00	Chaitra Sudi 10, 1901
16	Lands granted as Birta for use as orchard	Tokhal and Sunthan	121.5 muris	1,121.50	Chaitra Sudi 10, 1901
17	Lands granted for endowment as Guthi	Kirtipur, Chobhar and Patan	1000 muris	1,000.00	not given

== Ancestry ==
Ancestors of Mathabarsingh Thapa

16. Vikrama Thapa
8. Bir Bhadra Thapa
4. Amar Singh Thapa (sanukaji)
2. Nain Singh Thapa
5. Satya Rupa Maya
1. Mathabar Singh Thapa
24. Valirama Pande
12. Tularam Pande
6. Ranajit Pande
3. Rana Kumari Pande

== Gallery ==
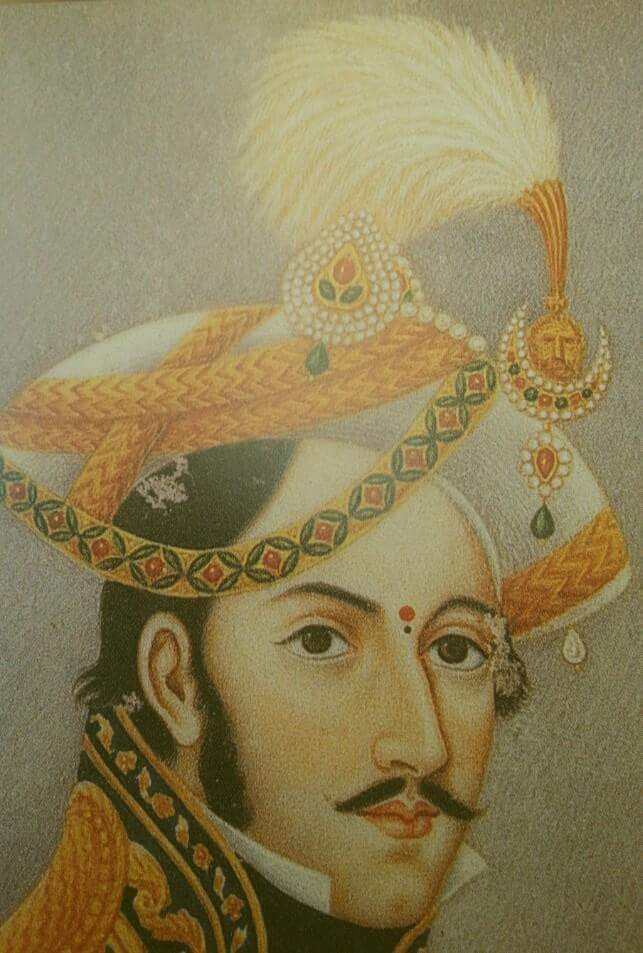
Mathabar Singh wearing the crown

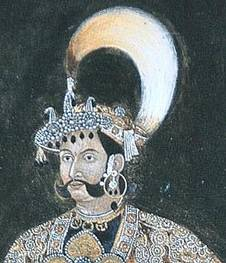
Mathabar Singh Thapa in a royal attire

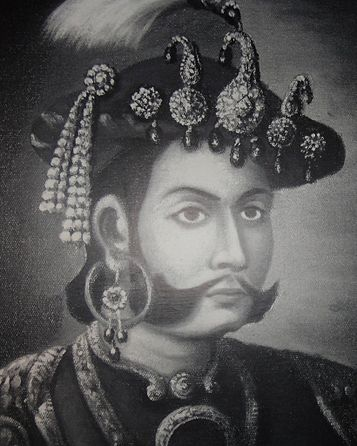
Mathabar Singh Thapa

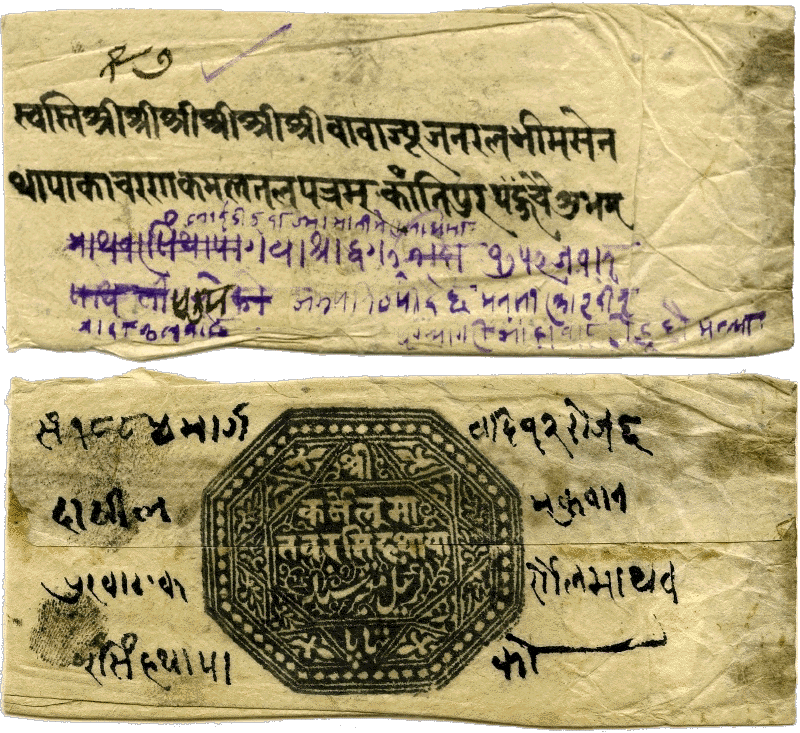
Mathabar Singh's letter signed by his cover seal, to PM Bhimsen Thapa 1884 B.S.
