= Thapa dynasty =

Political Chhetri family of Nepal

Thapa dynasty थापा वंश/थापा काजी खलक Thapas of Borlang (Gorkha)
- Noble house
- Country: Kingdom of Nepal; Gorkha Kingdom
- Founded: 18th century
- Founder: Birbhadra Thapa
- Current head: currently as pretender
- Final ruler: Mathabarsingh Thapa
- Titles: Hereditary Title of Kaji; Mukhtiyar of Nepal; Prime Minister of Nepal; Pradhan Senapati of the Nepalese Army; Commander-in-chief of the Nepalese Army; Governor of Palpa Province
- Styles: Kaaji Saheb; Thapa Kaji
- Estates: Bhimsen Tower; Bag Durbar; Thapathali Durbar; Chhauni Durbar
- Deposition: 17 May 1845 (by murder of Mathabar Singh Thapa)
- The family were members of Bagale Thapa clan and ChhetriRajput caste.

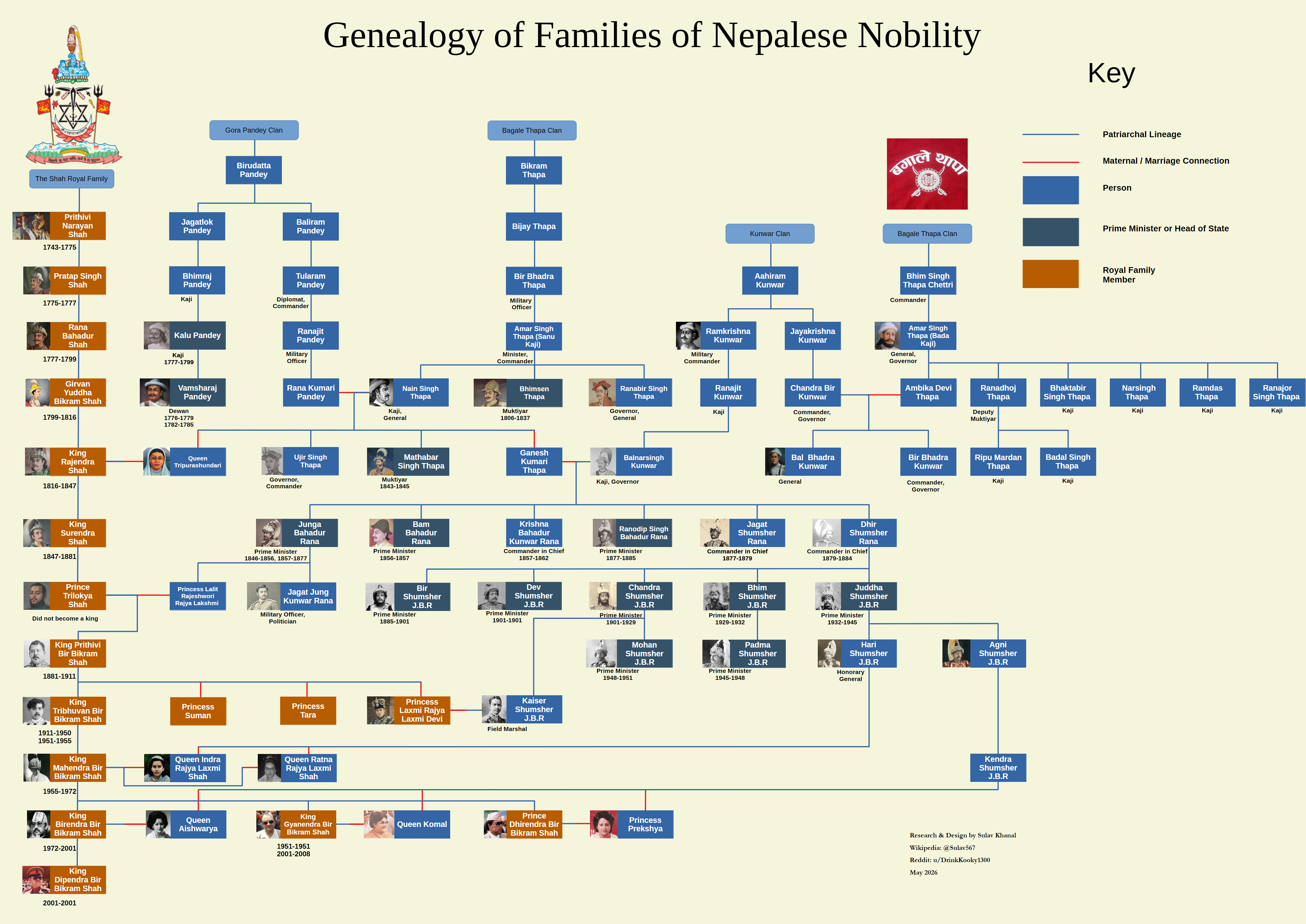
The relation between the Thapa, Kunwar, Rana, Pandey, and Shah families of Nepal showcasing the transfer of power throughout the history of Nepal.

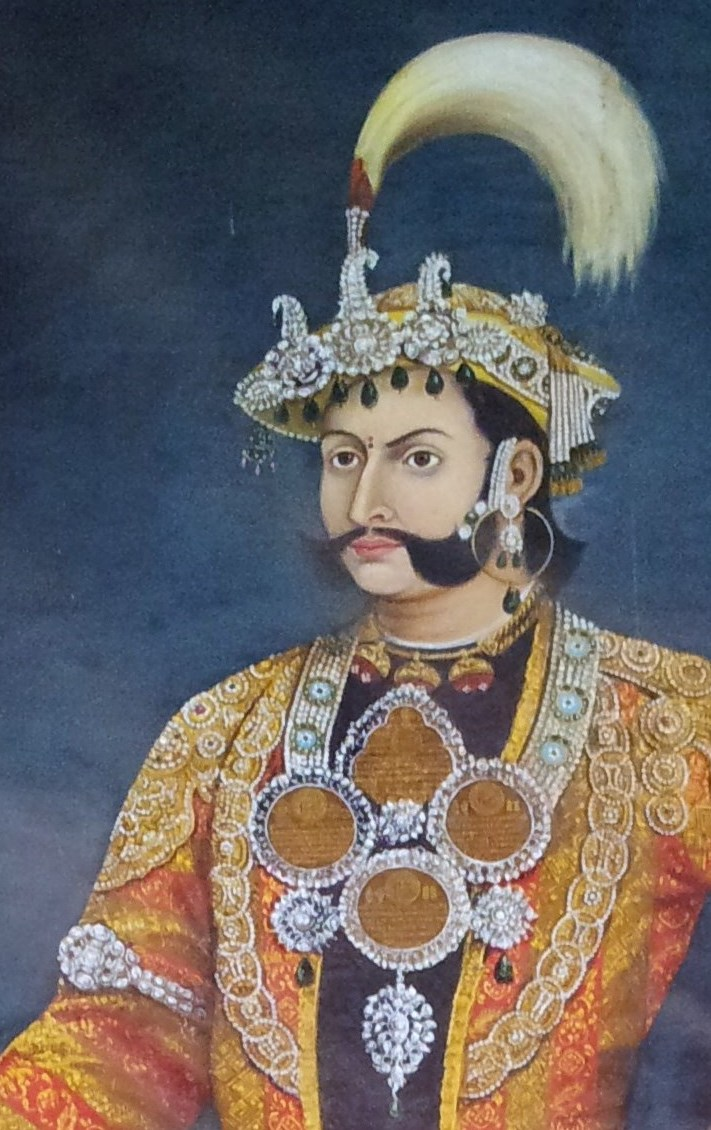
Mathabar Singh Thapa, crowned Mukhtiyar (1843 to 1845 A.D.) of noble Khas Rajput Thapa dynasty.

Thapa dynasty or Thapa noble family (Nepali: थापा वंश/थापा काजी खलक [t̪ʰapa bʌŋsʌ]) also known as Dynasty of Borlang (Note: The family had their origins in Borlang village of Gorkha region to differentiate from another related Bagale Thapa family of Badakaji Amar Singh Thapa known as "Dynasty of Sirhanchowk" as originated from Sirhanchowk village in Gorkha region.) was a Chhetri political family that handled Nepali administration affairs from 1806 to 1837 A.D. and 1843 to 1845 A.D. as Mukhtiyar (Prime Minister). This was one of the four noble families to be involved in the active politics of the Kingdom of Nepal, along with the Shah dynasty, Basnyat family, and the Pande family before the rise of the Rana dynastyor Kunwar family. At the end of the 18th century, Thapas had extreme dominance over Nepalese Darbar politics alternatively contesting for central power against the Pande family. Bir Bhadra Thapa was a Thapa of Chhetri group and leading Bharadar during Unification of Nepal. His grandson Bhimsen Thapa became Mukhtiyar of Nepal and established Thapa dynasty to the dominating position of central court politics of Nepal.

The Thapa family gave rise to the Rana dynasty of Jung Bahadur Kunwar Rana whose father Bal Narsingh Kunwar was the son-in-law of Kaji Nain Singh Thapa. Similarly, this dynasty was connected to the Pande aristocratic family through Nain Singh Thapa who was the son-in-law of once Mulkaji Ranajit Pande

== Background ==
The Thapa dynasty comes from the family of Kaji Bir Bhadra Thapa, commander of Unification of Nepal. He had three sons: Jeevan Thapa (died at the Battle of Kirtipur), Bangsha Raj Thapa, and Amar Singh Thapa (Sardar). The eldest son of Amar Singh Thapa (Sardar) was Bhimsen Thapa who later became an essential ruler in Nepalese history.

== The rise of Thapas (1743–1806) ==
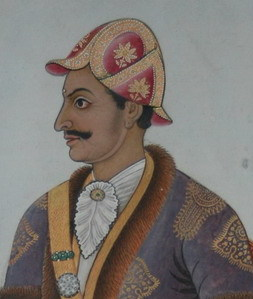
PM Bhimsen Thapa, founder of Thapa

The family became prominent during the rule of King Prithvi Narayan Shah and were established as a dominant faction during the reign of King Rana Bahadur Shah. After the assassination of King Rana Bahadur Shah, Bhimsen Thapa rose to the event killing all enemies and proving the strength and presence of the Thapa family in the Royal Court of Nepal. He went on to become the second Prime Minister of Nepal and thus founded the Thapa family in the political context of Nepal. Afterwards, the Thapas took the stronghold of the military power with an absolute order, which leads to a rivalry among other nobles.

== Thapas on power (1806–1837) ==
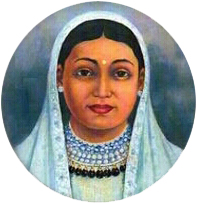
Portrait of Queen Tripurasundari of Nepal

Tripurasundari was the daughter of Bhimsen's brother, Kazi Nain Singh Thapa. After the chaos that followed King Rana Bahadur's murder, Bhimsen became the Mukhtiyar and his niece Tripurasundari was given the title Lalita Tripurasundari and declared regent and Queen Mother of Nepal. The Thapa family remained in power continuously even after the death of King Girvan Yuddha Bikram Shah and even after the peace deal (Treaty of Sugauli) with the British East India Company done between the then ruling prime minister Bhimsen Thapa representative of Nepal and British. The modernization of the Nepalese Army was done to keep things in control while convincing the suspicious British of no intention to use. Bhimsen increased his family members in court and military and also transferred other aristocratic families away from the capital. Bhimsen instated his youngest brother, General Ranabir Singh Thapa, in the royal palace as chief palace authority. Any meetings between the royal family and commoners or Bhardars were done under his permission and observation.

Thapas remained on political power from the military domination by Bhimsen Thapa. It was no secret that Bhimsen was able to maintain his supremacy due to the large standing army under his and his family's command. Thus, King Rajendra of Nepal feared the Thapa faction as

"...a race of men who for the last fifty-five years have dragged the country and its princes at the wheels of military car."

== The downfall of Thapas (1837–1839) ==
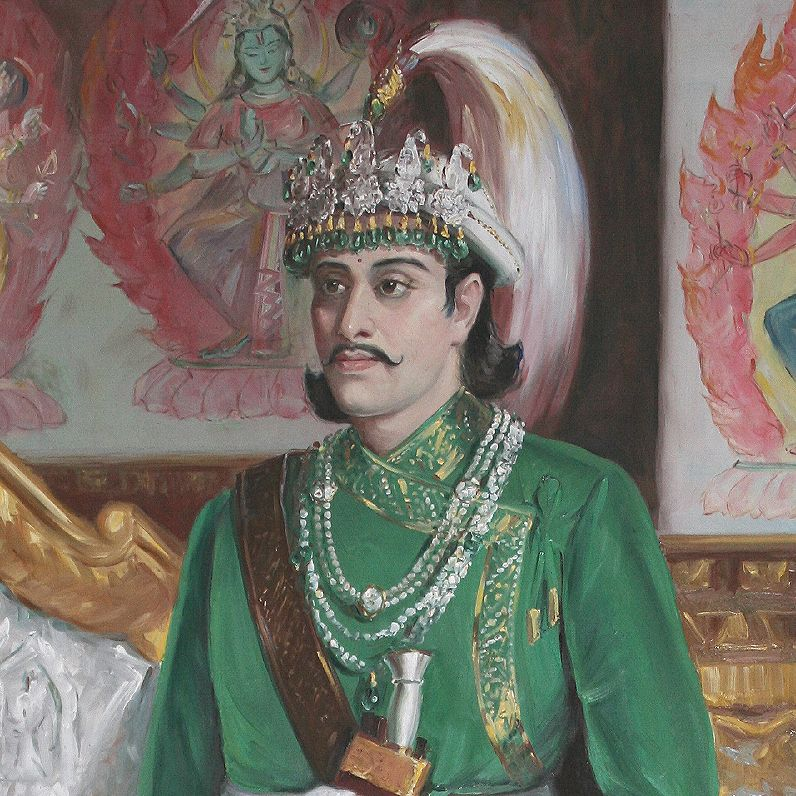
Portrait of King Rajendra Bikram Shah, a supporter of the anti-Thapa faction

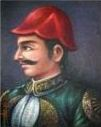
Rana Jang Pande, the leader of Pande family

Bhimsen had committed atrocities against the Pande family by being involved in the execution of Nepalese Chief Kazi Damodar Pande. Rana Jang Pande, the youngest son of Damodar Pande, was a supporter of Senior Queen Samrajya Laxmi and had planned for the downfall of the 31-year Thapa rule. In the Nepalese court, the rivalry between the two queens rose where the Senior Queen supported the Pandes, while the Junior Queen supported the Thapas. Bhimsen went to his ancestral home in Gorkha for some time, making Ranabir Singh Thapa as Acting Mukhtiyar. Rana Jang Pande, the leading member of Pande aristocratic family and his brother, Ranadal Pande, was elevated in the Nepal Darbar.

On 24 July 1837, King Rajendra Bikram Shah's infant son, Devendra Bikram Shah, died. Bhimsen and members of the Thapa faction were blamed and conspired against. On this charge, Bhimsen and whole the Thapa family, the court physicians, Ekdev and Eksurya Upadhyay, and his deputy Bhajuman Baidya, with relatives of the Thapas were incarcerated, proclaimed outcasts, and their properties confiscated.

Fatte Jang Shah, Rangnath Poudel, and the Junior Queen Rajya Laxmi Devi, the anti-Pande faction, obtained from the King the liberation of Bhimsen, Mathabar, and the rest of the party, about eight months after they were incarcerated for the poisoning case. Confiscation of some properties was pardoned. The pro-Thapa soldiers rallied to Bhimsen, Mathabar Singh, and Sherjung Thapa's houses. Mathabar Singh fled to India while pretending to go on a hunting trip; Ranbir Singh gave up all his property and became a sanyasi, titling himself Swami Abhayananda; but Bhimsen Thapa preferred to remain in his old home in Gorkha.

== The final chapter of Thapas (1843–1845) ==
=== The resurrection of Thapa ===
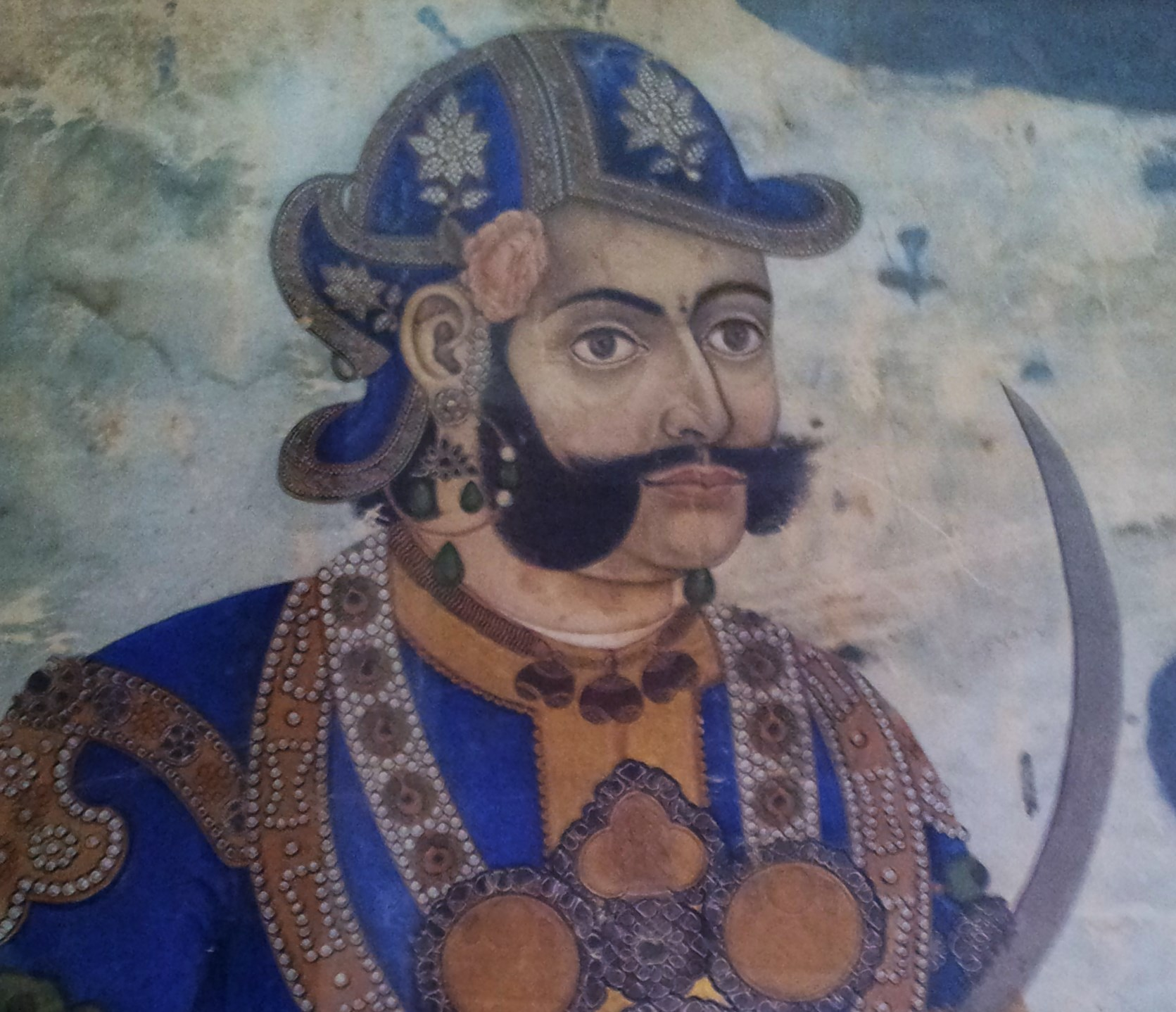
Portrait of Mathabar Singh Thapa in National Museum of Nepal, Chhauni

Mathabarsingh Thapa fled to India when Bhimsen Thapa and Thapa courtiers were punished. Sher Jung Thapa and other jailed Thapa members were pardoned on the request of Junior Queen after the death of Senior Queen. Mathabar, the most senior Thapa, was requested to return to Nepal by then ruling Junior Queen Rajya Laxmi after six years of exile. Mathabarsingh Thapa arrived in Kathmandu Valley on 17 April 1843 where he was greeted with state honors. He then re-opened the murder case of his uncle and godfather Bhimsen Thapa, and members of Pande faction and their supporters were executed.

=== End of Thapas ===
The murder of Mathabar Singh on 17 May 1845 by his nephew, Janga Bahadur Kunwar, on the orders of King Rajendra Bikram Shah and his Junior Queen, ended the Thapa family's rule in Nepal giving rise to Agnatic Rana dynasty.

== Family palaces ==
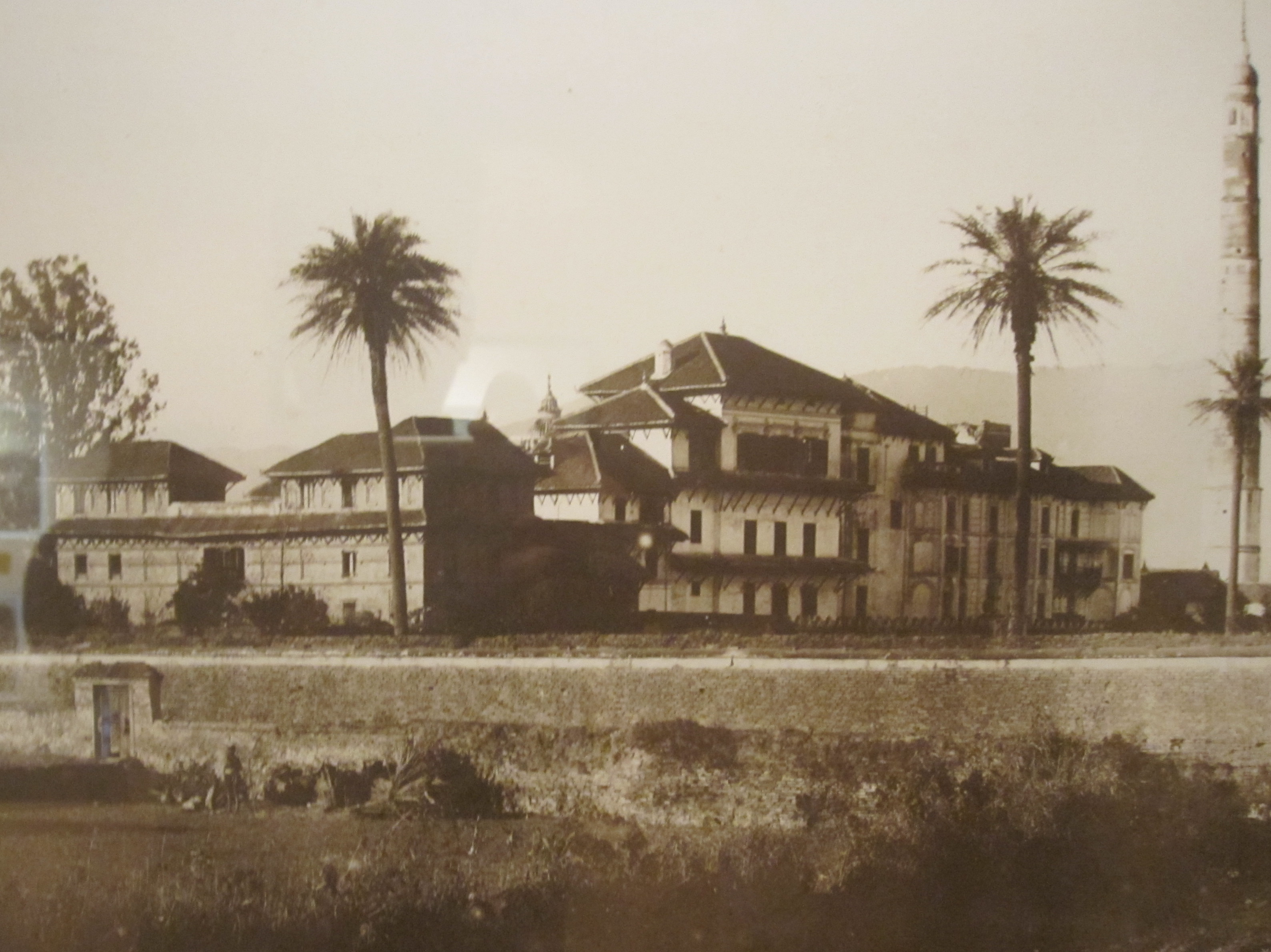
Bagh Durbar (lit. Tiger's mansion), Palace of ruling Mukhtiyar Bhimsen Thapa

The family resided at Thapathali Durbar and Bagh Durbar. Bagh Durbar was constructed by Bhimsen Thapa, who moved to reside near the Basantapur Palace. He initially moved from Gorkha district to Thapathali Durbar and eventually to Bagh Durbar.

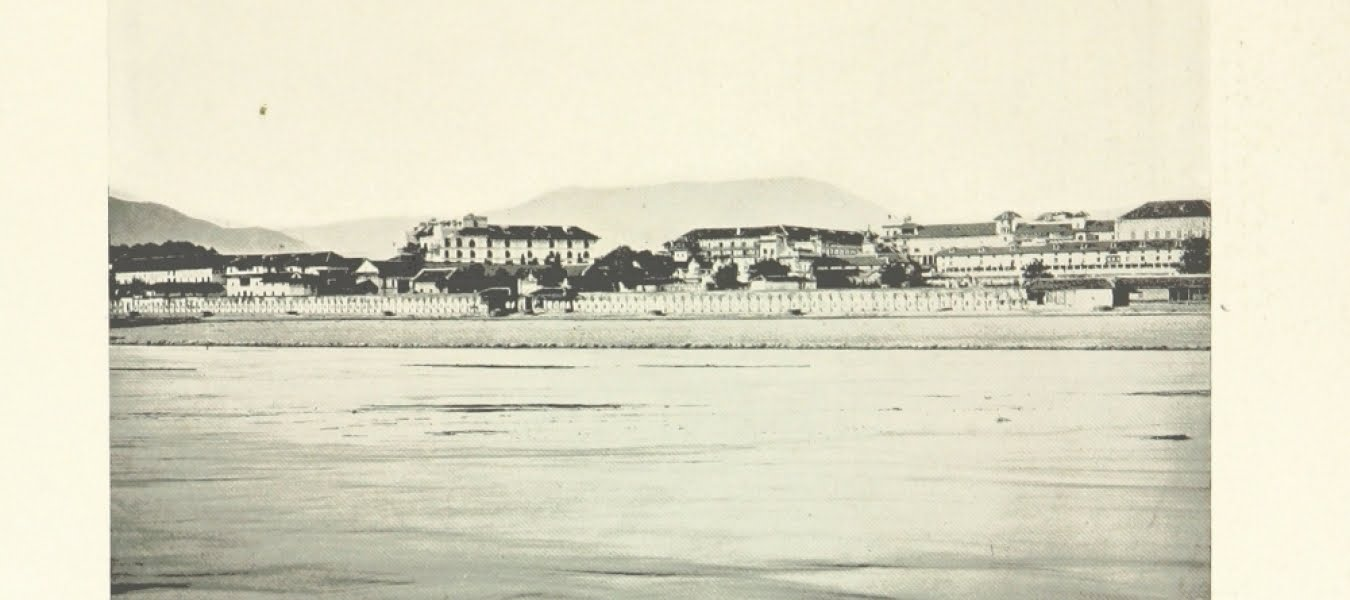
Thapathali Durbar from opposite side of Bagmati River

Bagh Durbar, which literally means The Tiger's Mansion, was built in 1805 A.D. by PM Bhimsen Thapa. It had a spacious Janarala Bagh (General's Garden), a pond and many temples glorifying the Mukhtiyar General. When Thapa rule was revived, PM Mathabarsingh Thapa recaptured the lost palace and resided there for two years.

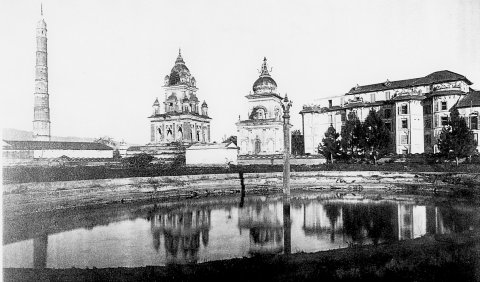
Dharahara tower, Ram Chandra Temple and Bag Darbar

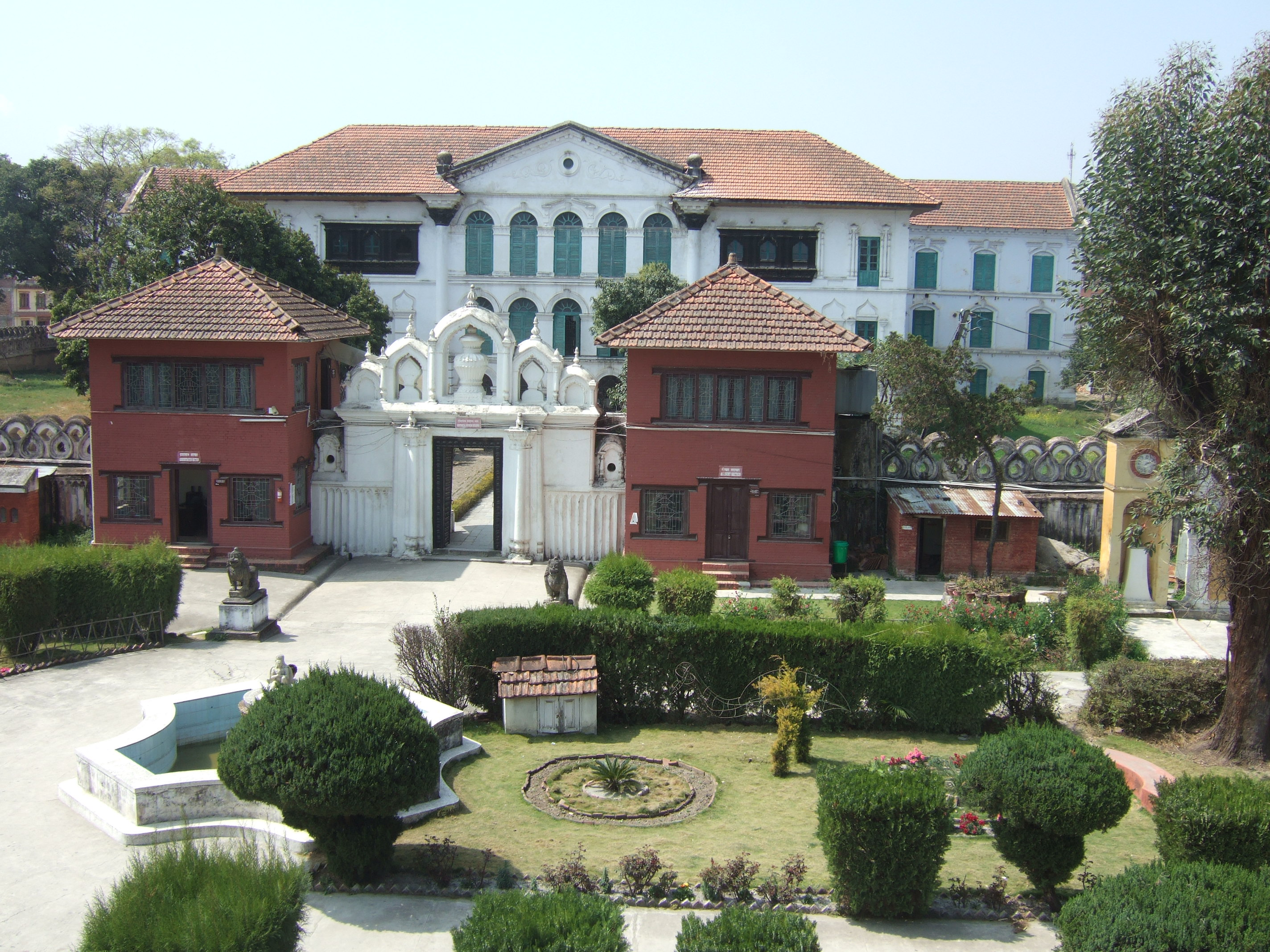
National Museum of Nepal at Chhauni, Former Residence of Thapa Mukhtiyar Bhimsen Thapa

The National Museum of Nepal at Chhauni was once a residence to Prime Minister Bhimsen Thapa. The building has a collection of bronze sculptures, paubha paintings, and weapons including the sword gifted by French Emperor Napoleon I.

== Thapa family members ==
No.	Members	Image	Position	Years ruled	Notes
1	Bhimsen Thapa		Mukhtiyar (Prime Minister) and Commander-in-Chief	1806 to 1837 A.D.	Longest-serving prime minister in Nepal's history
2	Ranabir Singh Thapa		Acting Mukhtiyar (Acting Prime Minister)	1837 A.D. (briefly)	
3	Mathabarsingh Thapa		Prime Minister and Commander-in-Chief	1843 to 1845 A.D.	
4	Queen Tripurasundari of Nepal		Queen Consort and Mother Regent of Nepal	1805 to 1832 A.D.	
5	Bir Bhadra Thapa		Jetha Buda and Bhardar		He is the male patriarch of this dynasty and the senior Bharadar (politician) of the Gorkha Kingdom
6	Sanukaji Amar Singh Thapa		Governor and Sardar		Distinguished from Commander of Western forces Badakaji Amar Singh Thapa by terms Bada (Senior) and Sanu (Junior)
7	Nain Singh Thapa		General and Minister (Kaji)		
8	Ujir Singh Thapa		Governor and Colonel		son of Nain Singh Thapa
9	Bakhtawar Singh Thapa		Colonel		Brother of Bhimsen
10	Sher Jung Thapa		Colonel		Nephew and adopted son of Bhimsen
11	Amrit Singh Thapa		Kaji		Brother of Bhimsen, involved in bringing back Balbhadra Kunwar at Dehradun
12	Ranzawar Thapa				Step-brother of Bhimsen
13	Ranabam (Bhotu) Thapa				Step-brother of Bhimsen
14	Tilak (Tri) Bikram Singh Thapa		Kaji		Known popularly as Kaji Mama by Shamsher Ranas; son of Bakhtawar Singh
15	Ranojjwal Singh Thapa				Son of Mathabarsingh Singh
16	Bikram Singh Thapa		Colonel		Son of Mathabarsingh Singh

=== Family Tree of Bir Bhadra Thapa ===
Bir Bhadra Thapa
Jiwan Thapa	Bangsha Raj Thapa	Satyarupa Maya	Amar Singh Thapa (sanu)	?
Bhimsen Thapa	Nain Singh Thapa	Bakhtawar Singh Thapa	Amrit Singh Thapa	Ranabir Singh Thapa	Ranbam Thapa	Ranzawar Thapa
? (son died young)	Lalita Devi Pande	Janak Kumari Pande	Dirgha Kumari Pande

=== Family Tree of Kazi Singh Thapa ===
Nain Singh Thapa	Rana Kumari Pande
Ganesh Kumari Kunwar	Queen Tripurasundari of Nepal (born 1794)	Ujir Singh Thapa (born 1796)	Mathabarsingh Thapa (born 1798)
Ranojjwal Singh Thapa	Bikram Singh Thapa	Amar Singh Thapa II	Rana Abal Singh Thapa	Ranjor Singh Thapa

== Other Thapa nobles ==
The unrelated family of Amar Singh Thapa was also included in broader Thapa caucus.

No.	Other Members	Image	Position	Years active	Notes
1	Badakaji Amar Singh Thapa		Kaji and General of Nepal	1759–1816 AD	Distinguished from father of Bhimsen Thapa and Palpa Administrator Sanukaji Amar Singh Thapa by terms Bada (Senior) and Sanu (Junior)
2	Bhakti Thapa		Sardar of Nepal Army	died 1815 AD	No blood relations to both Bhimsen Thapa and Badakaji Amar Singh Thapa
3	Ranadhoj Thapa		Deputy Prime Minister of Nepal	retired in 1831	eldest son of Badakaji Amar Singh Thapa
4	Ranajor Singh Thapa		Kaji and Colonel of Nepal		youngest son of Badakaji Amar Singh Thapa
5	Surath Singh Thapa		Kaji (later Captain only) and Joint-Chief signatory of Darbar	appointed in 1832	grandson of Badakaji Amar Singh Thapa
6	Bhaktabir Thapa		Captain and later Kaji	retired in 1839	second son of Badakaji Amar Singh Thapa
7	Narsingh Thapa		Captain and Kaji alternatively	appointed in 1818	third son of Badakaji Amar Singh Thapa

== Allies and opponents ==
List of Allies during Transition Phase (1837–1846)

No.	Name	Type	Noted
1	Ranganath Paudel	Mostly allied	Known strong supporter of Bhimsen Thapa.
2	Junior Queen Rajya Lakshmi Devi	Mostly allied but later switched alliance	Lastly, she supported attack on Thapas in 1845.
3	Fateh Jung Shah	Mildly allied	Supported the release of Thapas in 1837.
4	Gora Pande faction	Mild supporter	Known supporter and relatives of Thapa faction through Nain Singh Thapa.

List of Opponents during Transition Phase (1837–1846)

No.	Name	Type	Noted
1	Kala Pande faction	Strong opponent	Known strong opponent of Thapa faction.
2	Rajendra Bikram Shah and Senior Queen Samrajya Lakshmi Devi	Strong opponent	Known strong opponent of Thapa faction.
3	Basnyat family	Mild	Favoured Pandes over Thapas due to previous marital ties.
4	Kunwar family (Later Rana dynasty)	Former Alliance grew strong opponent.	Nephew Jung Bahadur Rana ended Thapa hegemony.
5	Chautariya Pushkar Shah	Mild	Favoured Pandes over Thapas.
6	Brian Houghton Hodgson	Strong opponent but later sympathized.	Known strong opponent of Bhimsen Thapa but later sympathized Bhimsen.

== Works ==
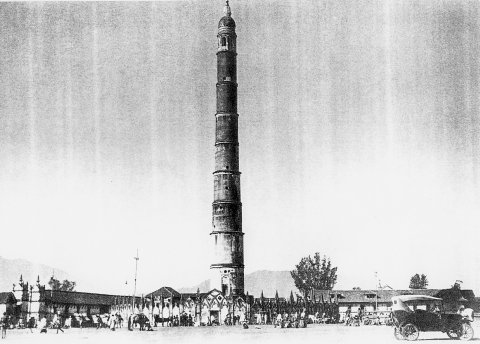
The first Dharahara before the 1934 earthquake

Dharahara tower was built by Mukhtiyar Bhimsen Thapa. Dharahara is said to be built for Queen Tripurasundari of Nepal, who was the niece of Bhimsen Thapa.

== Gallery ==
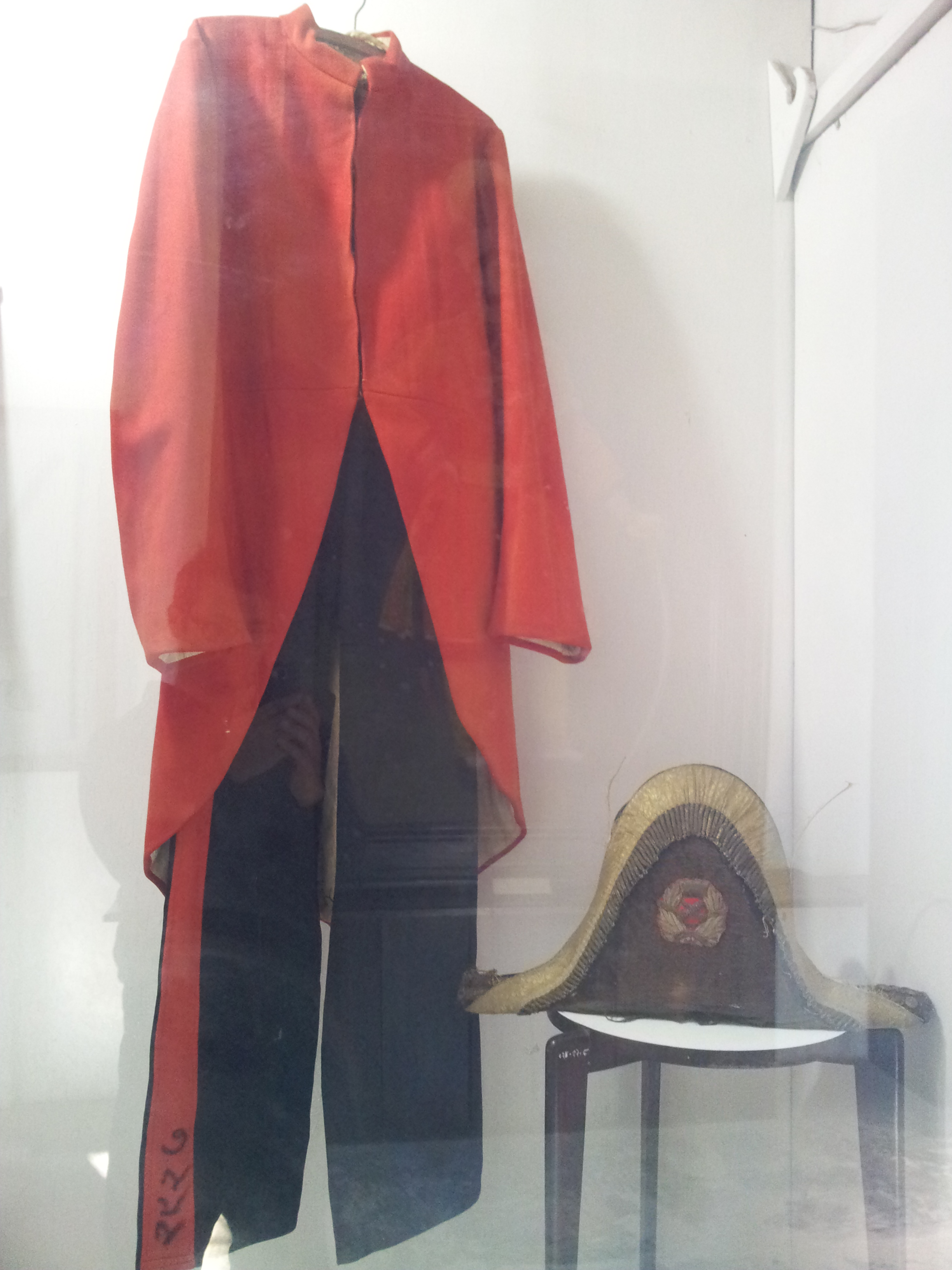
Clothes worn by Mukhtiyar Bhimsen Thapa

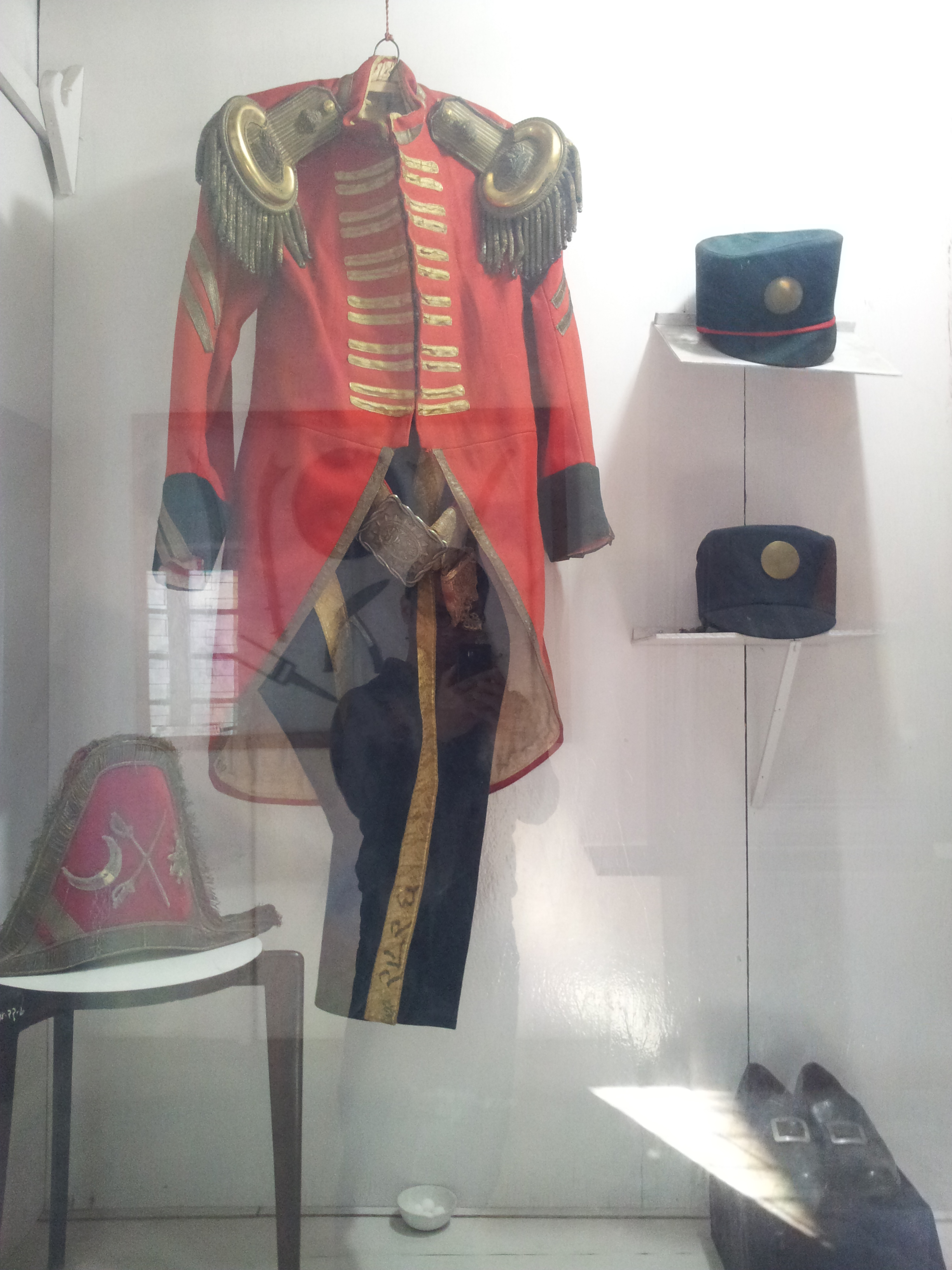
Clothes worn by Mukhtiyar Bhimsen Thapa

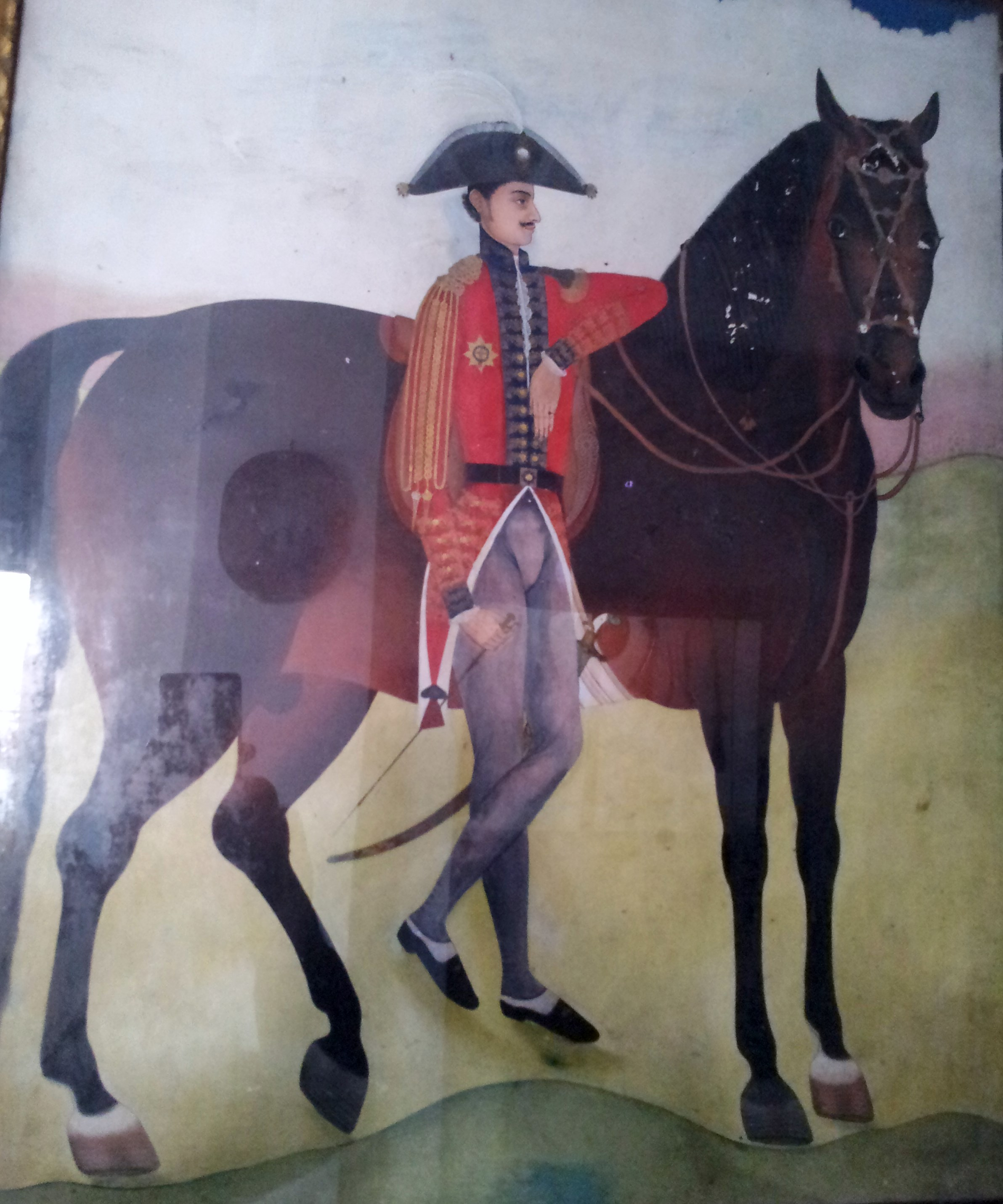
Picture of Bhimsen Thapa standing beside a horse

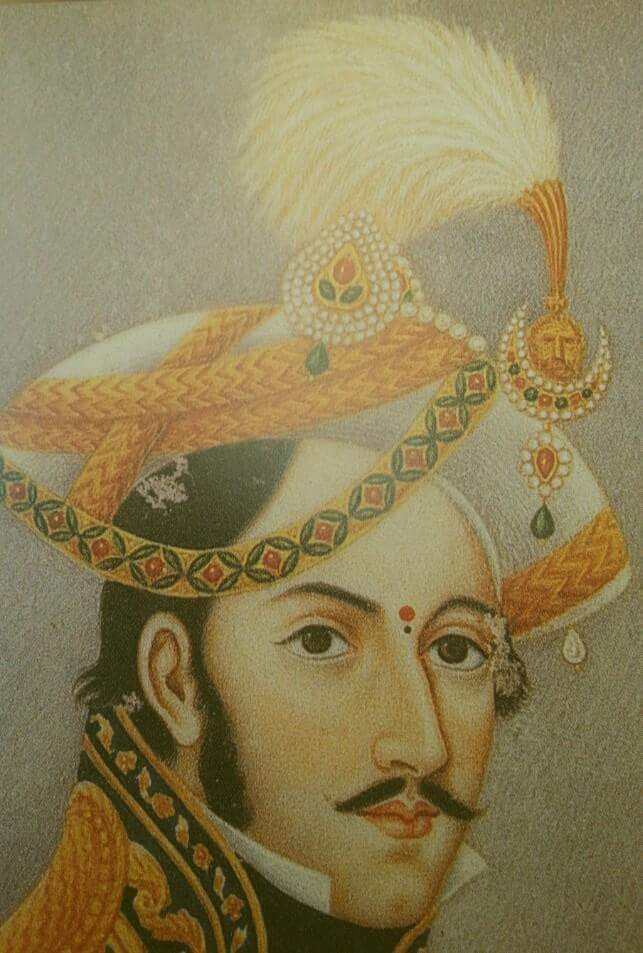
PM Mathabar Singh Thapa in crown

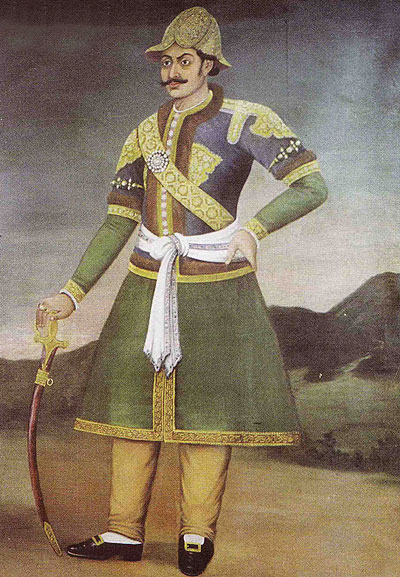
Portrait of Mukhtiyar General Bhimsen Thapa

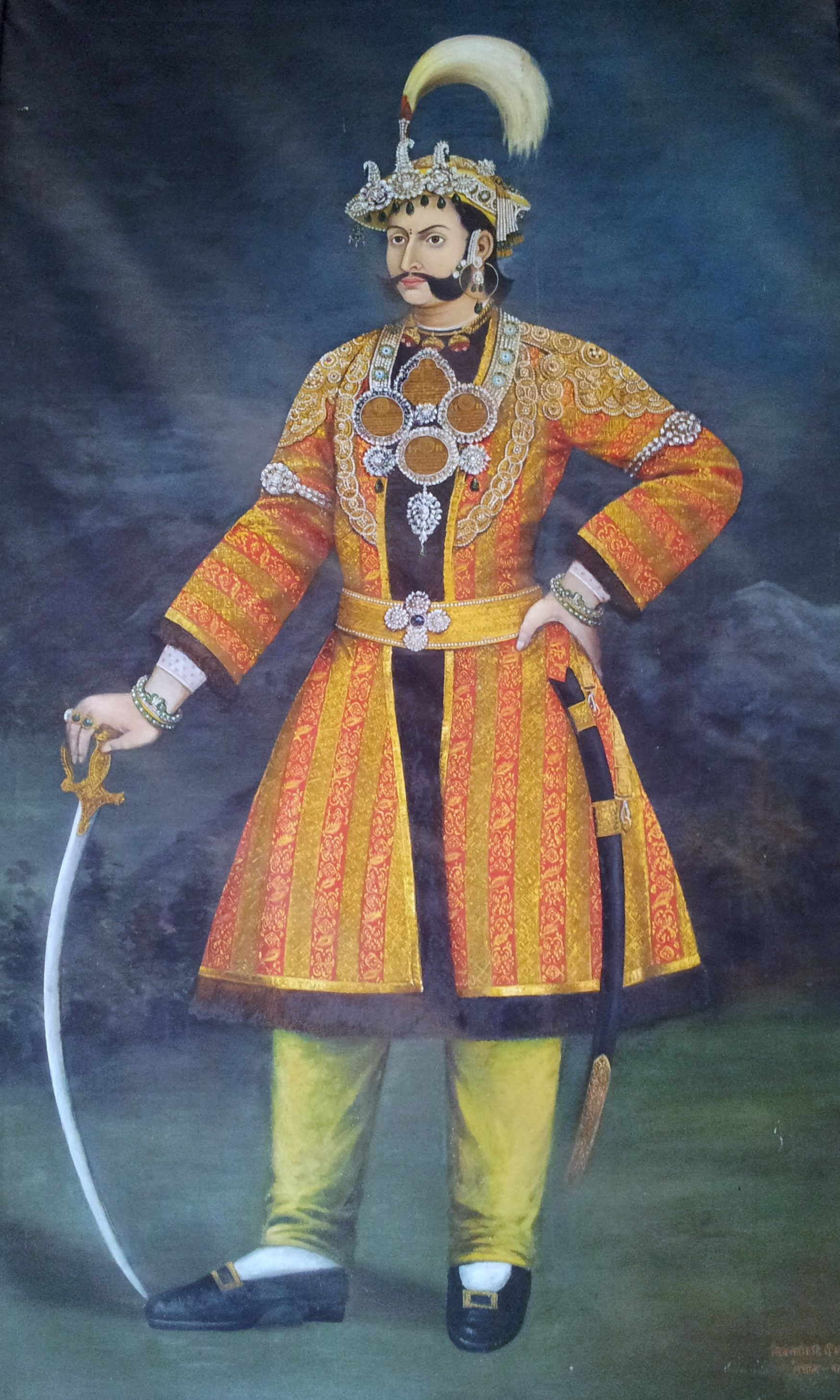
Portrait of first titled Prime Minister Mathabar Singh Thapa

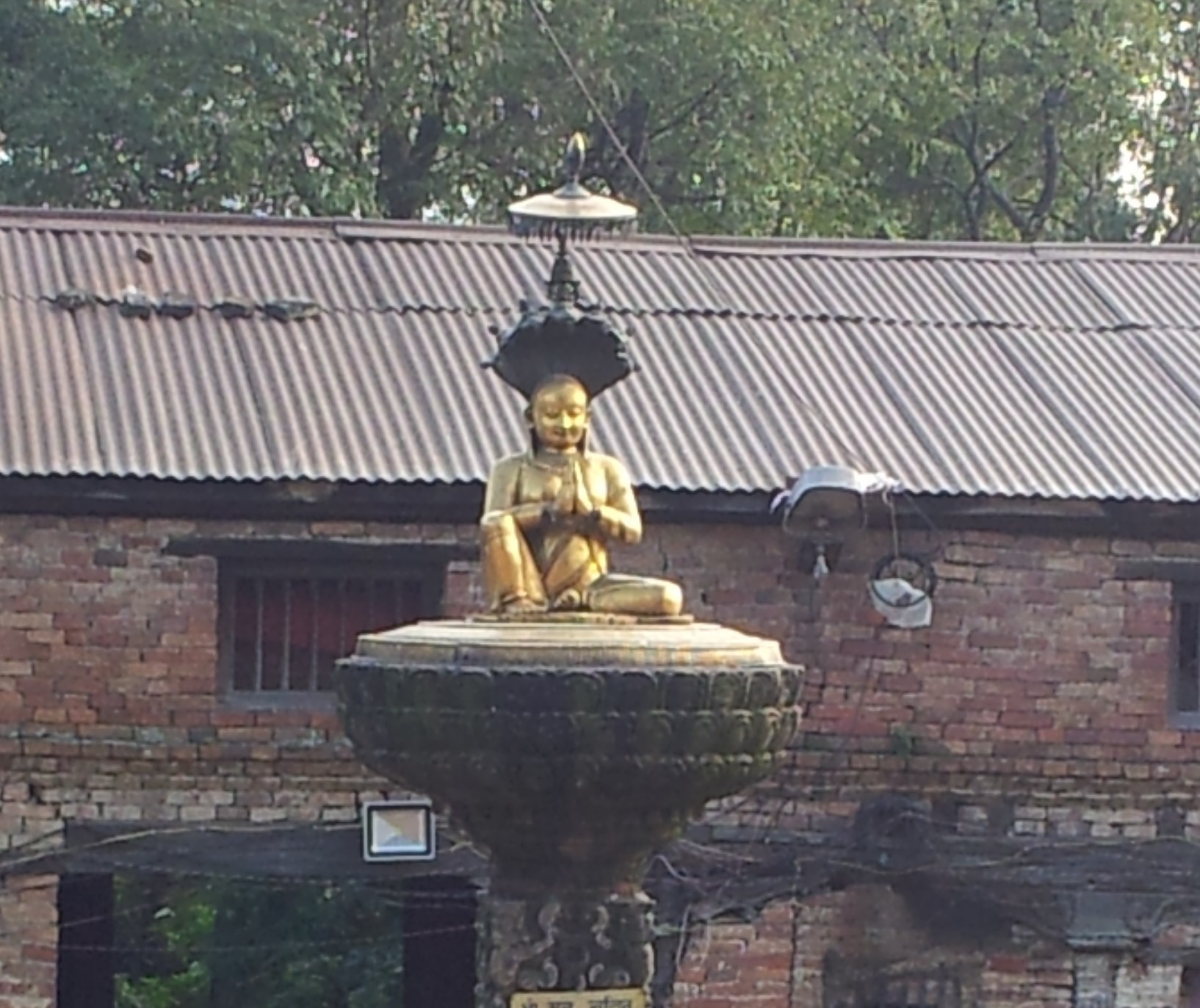
Statue of Queen Tripurasundari

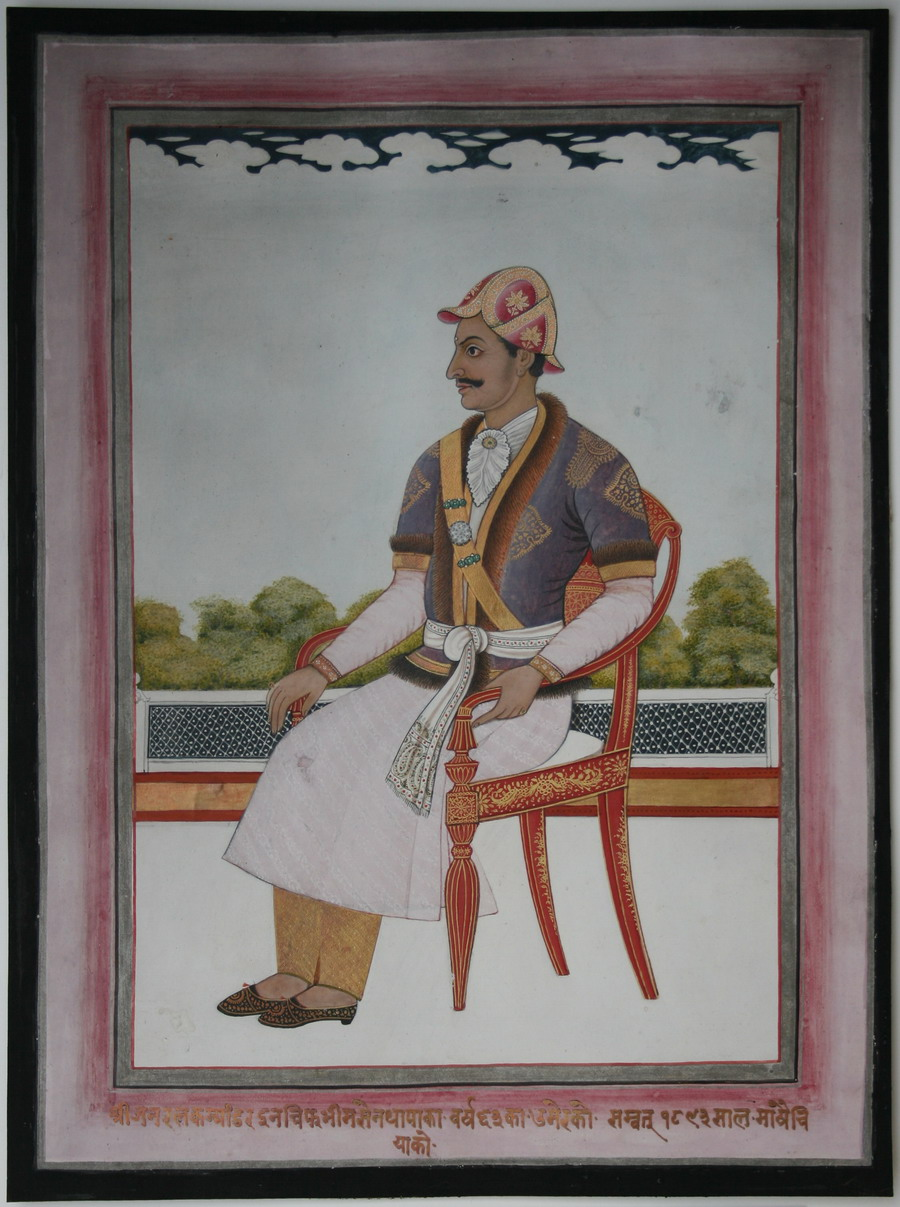
Portrait of Mukhtiyar General Bhimsen Thapa

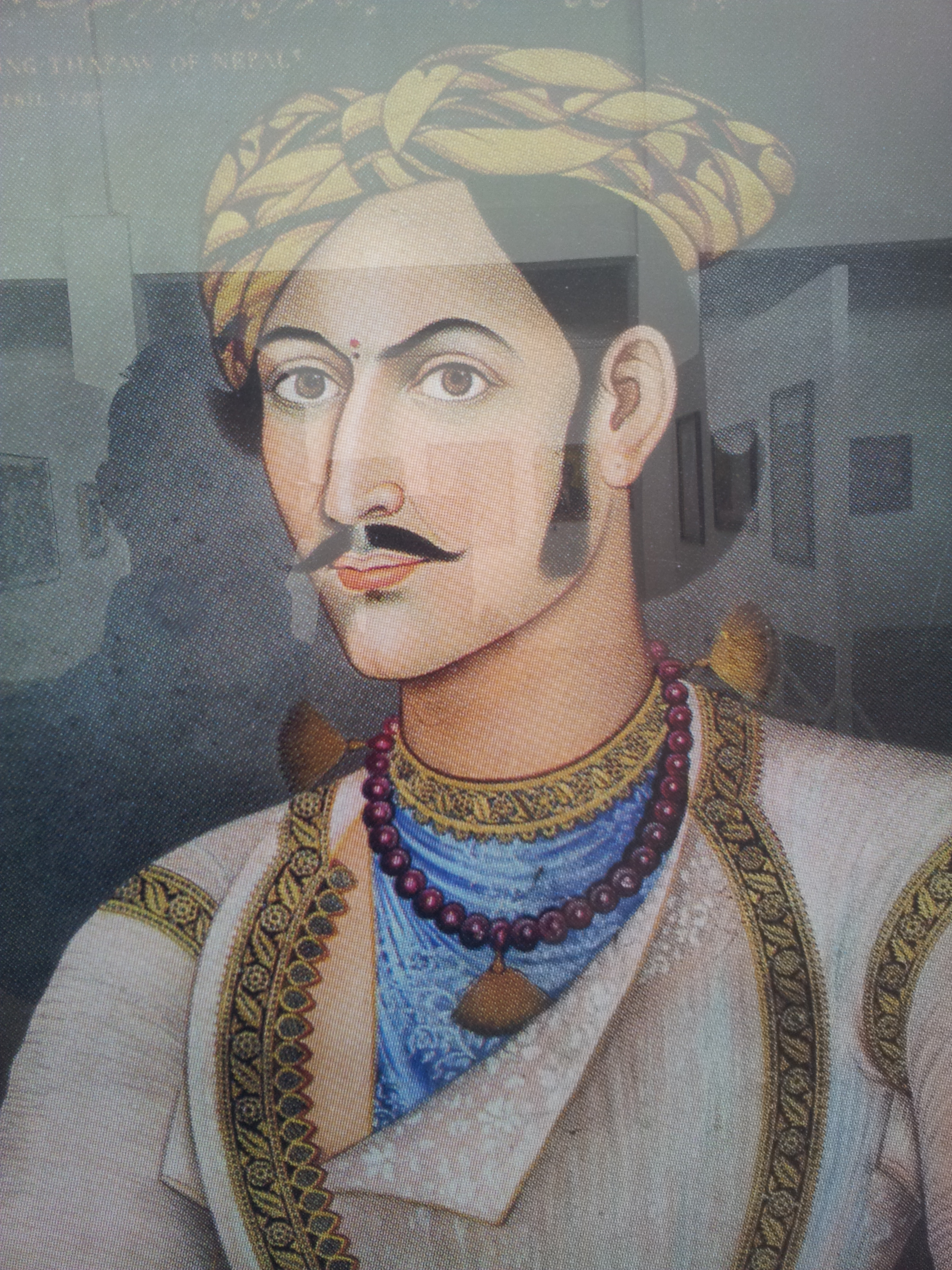
Portrait of Colonel Mathabar Singh Thapa from 1831

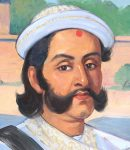
Portrait of Mathabar Singh Thapa

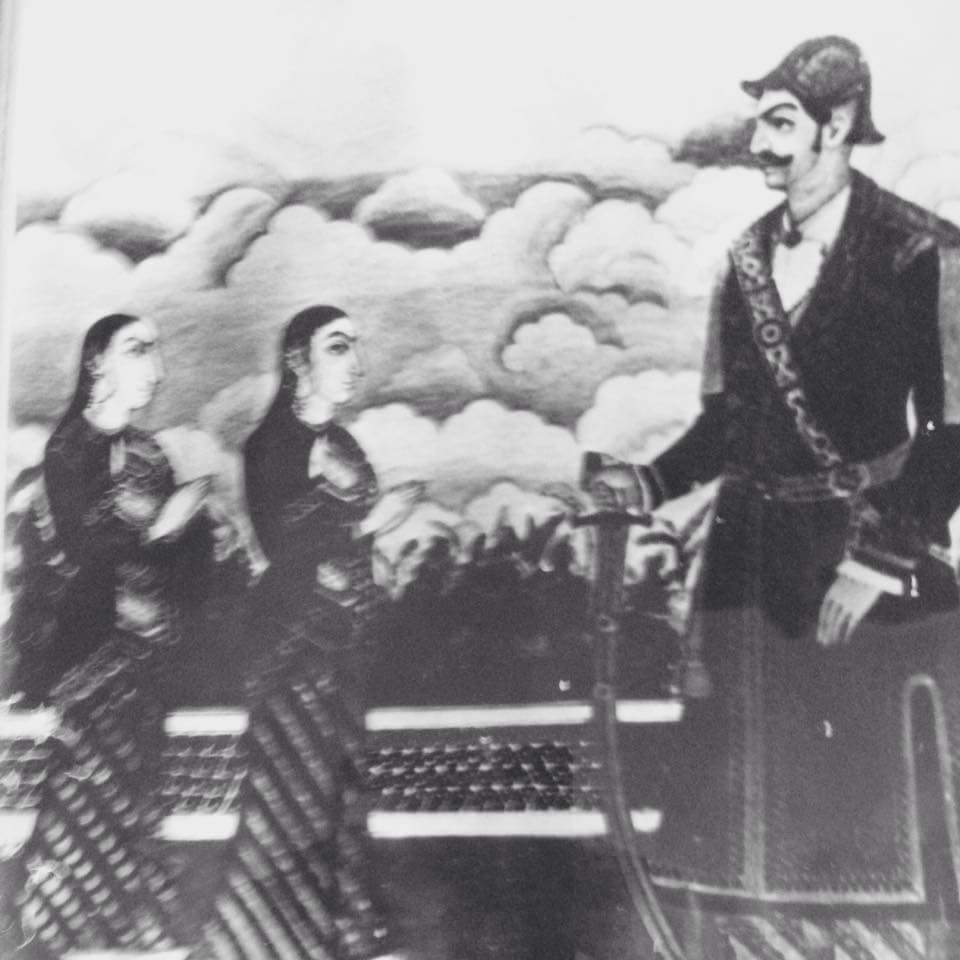
Bhimsen Thapa and two wives

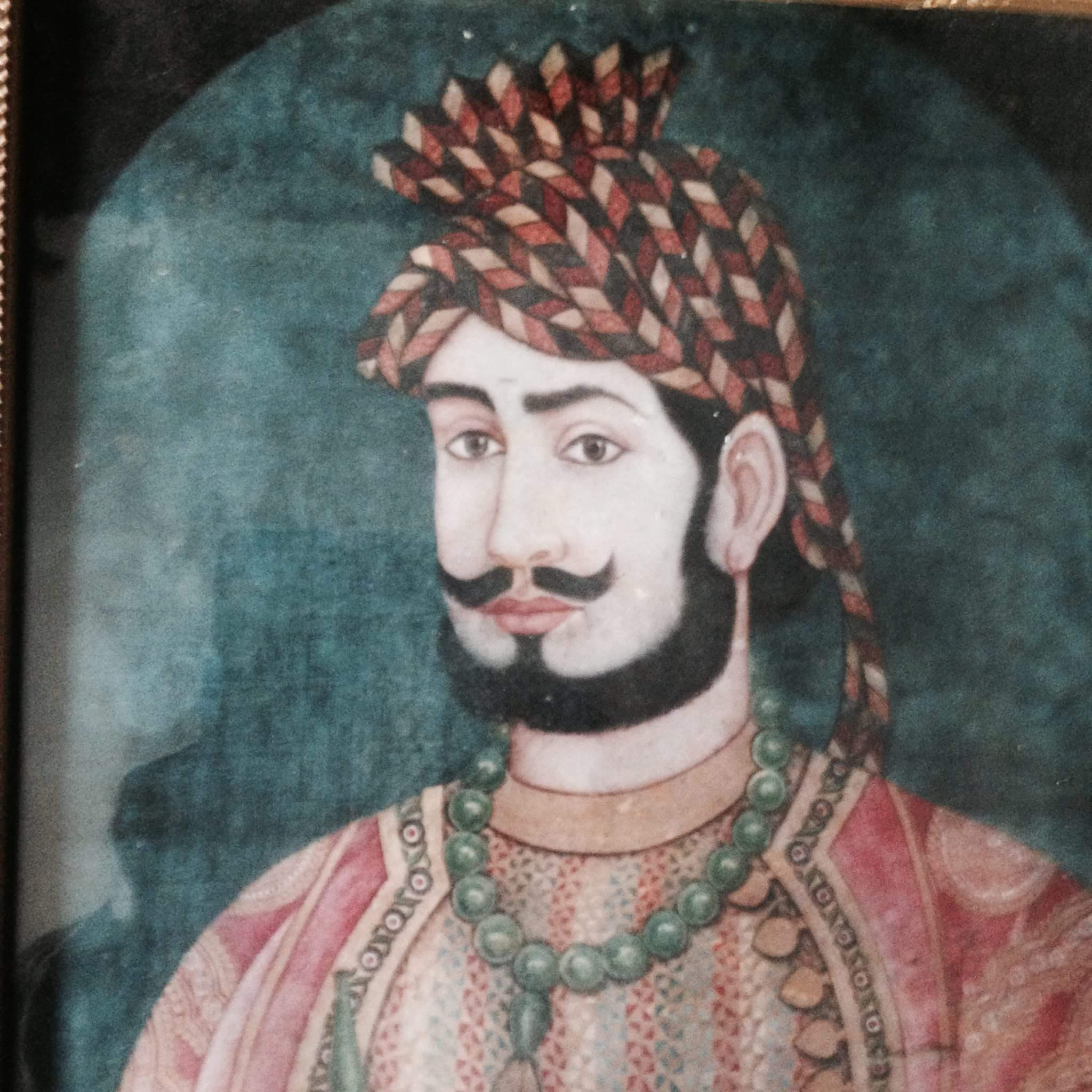
Mathabar Simha Thapa in Panjabi court

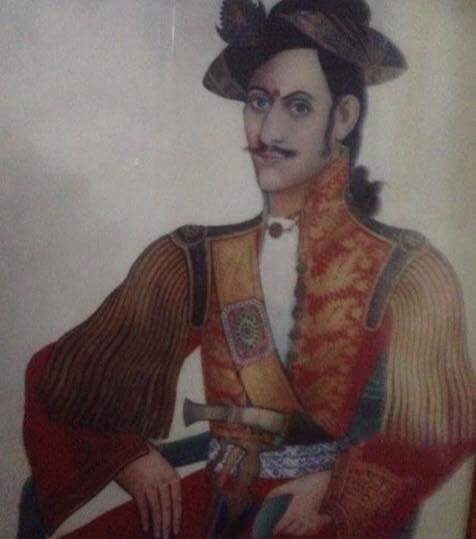
Portrait of Ranabir Singh Thapa

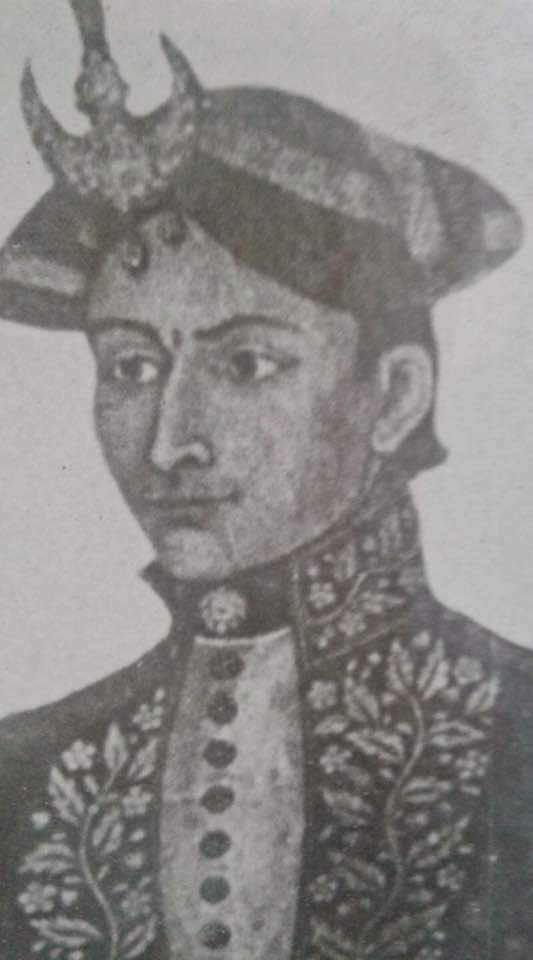
Portrait of Ujir Singh Thapa

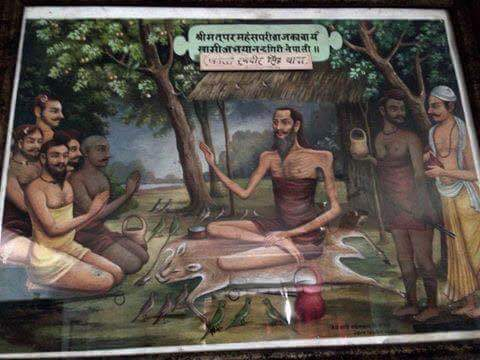
Portrait of Ranabir Singh Thapa as Swami Abhayananda

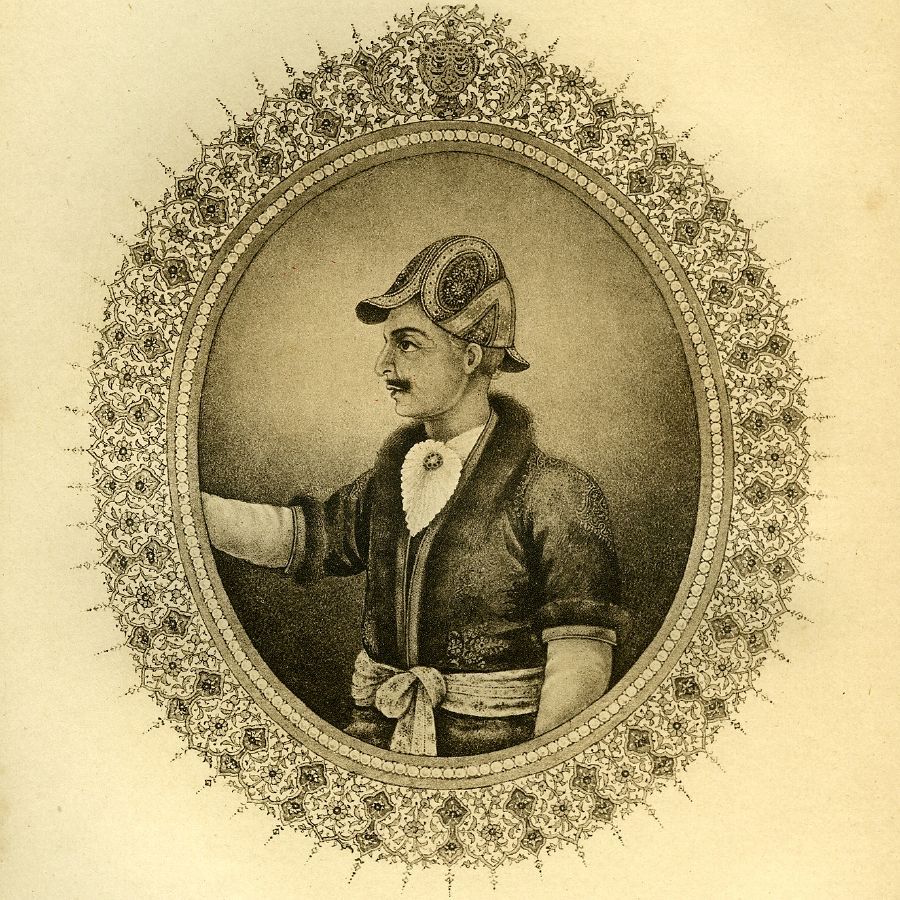
Bhimsen Thapa,

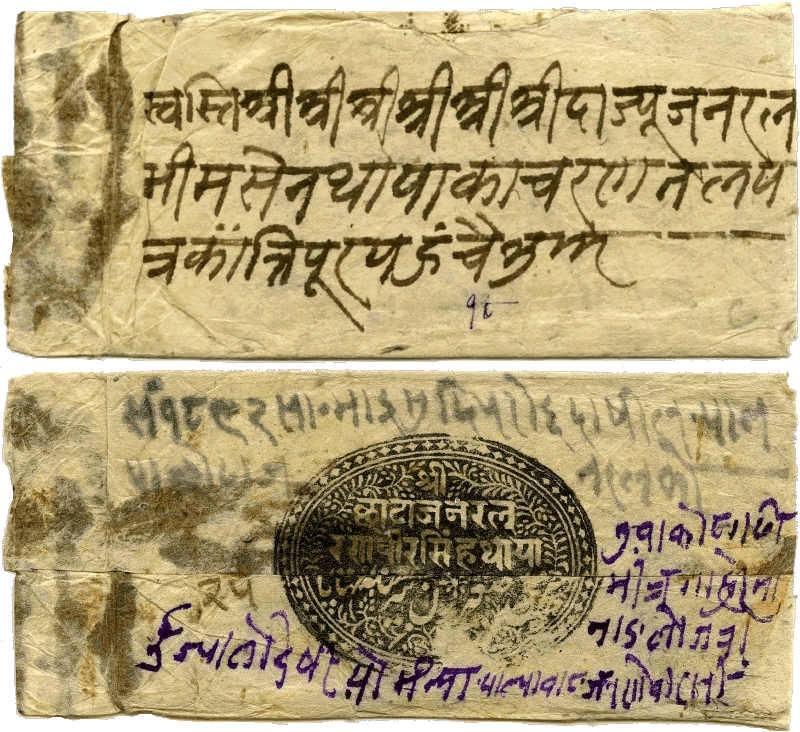
General Ranabir Singh Thapa's letter signed by his private black seal sent to Mukhtiyar (PM) Bhimsen Thapa and 2nd Kazi (Deputy PM) Ranadhoj Thapa

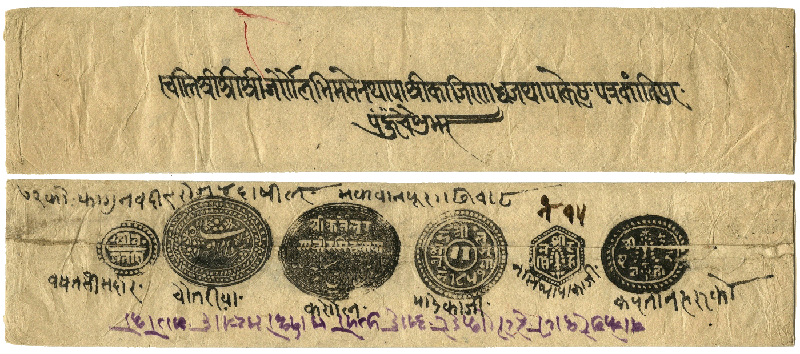
Letter sent to PM Bhimsen Thapa and Kazi Ranadhoj Thapa by (Pvt. seal L to R) Bakhat Singh Sardar, Dalbhanjan Pande (Pande Kazi), Ranabir Singh Thapa, Kaji Narsingh Thapa (Elder Amar Singh Thapa's another son) and sundry captains

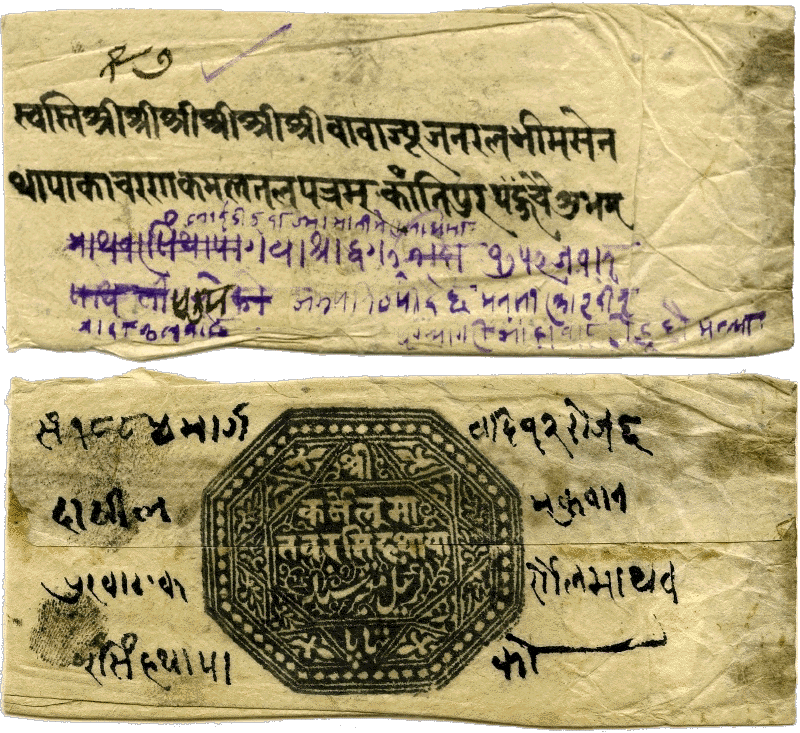
Letter sent to PM Bhimsen Thapa and Kazi Ranadhoj Thapa by then Colonel Mathabar Singh Thapa

== See also ==
- Basnyat family
- Rana dynasty
- Shah dynasty
