= Bhawani Singh Khatri =

Sardar Bhawani Singh Khatri
- सरदार भवानी सिंह खत्री

Governor of Nepal
- Monarch: King Rajendra Bikram Shah

Personal details
- Died: 1846 AD Kathmandu

Military service
- Allegiance: Kingdom of Nepal

Bhawani Singh Khatri was the governor (or sardar) of the kingdom of Nepal in the 19th century under King Rajendra Bikram Shah. He was a close associate of King Rajendra, and was described as his favorite and the most trusted military officer.

== Later life ==
Next morning of the massacre of Kot Parva after which Jang Bahadur Rana became the commander-in-chief of Nepal, reportedly on the order of Queen Rajya Lakshmi Devi, he had a meeting with king Rajendra. After listening to Jung Bahadur, the frustrated king met Queen Rajya and declared that he would depart for Varanasi, India. The king walked out to Tudikhel and was accompanied by Sardar Bhawani Singh Khatri throughout the day. One of Jung Bahadur's brothers persuaded the king to return to the palace, and allegedly on the Queen's order, Bhawani Singh was beheaded that night and the head was sent to the Queen.
