= Rajendra Bikram Shah =

King of Nepal from 1816 to 1847

Rajendra Bikram Shah Dev राजेन्द्र विक्रम शाह देव
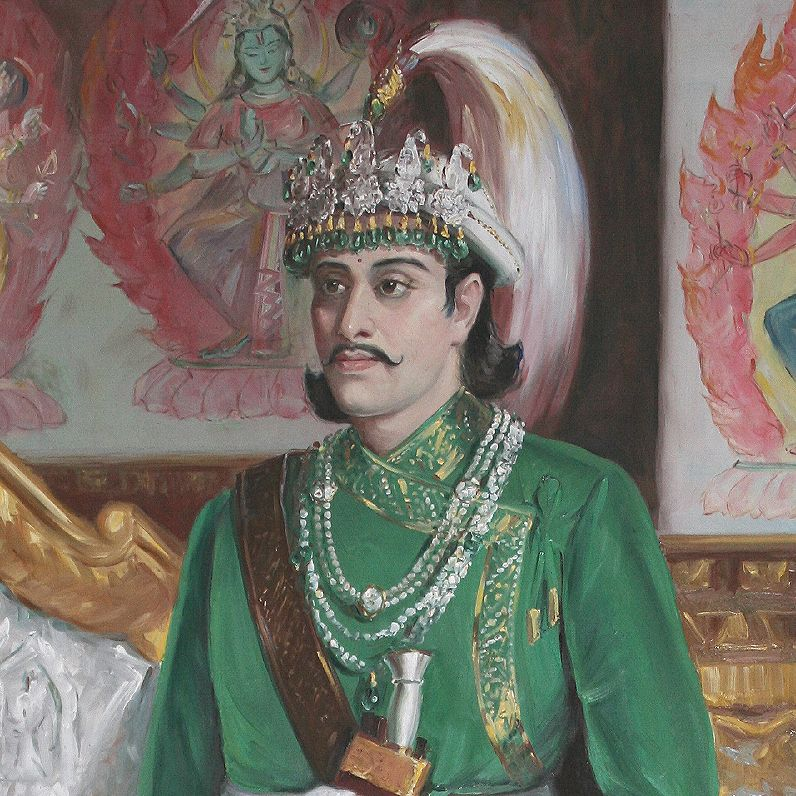

King of Nepal
- Reign: 20 November 1816 – 12 May 1847
- Predecessor: Girvan Yuddha Bikram Shah
- Successor: Surendra Bikram Shah
- Prime ministers: See list: Bhimsen Thapa Rana Jang Pande Ranga Nath Poudyal Chautariya Puskhar Shah Ranga Nath Poudyal Mathabar Singh Thapa Fateh Jung Shah Jung Bahadur Rana
- Born: 3 December 1813; Basantapur, Kingdom of Nepal
- Died: 10 July 1881 (aged 67); Bhaktapur, Kingdom of Nepal
- Spouse: Samrajya Lakshmi Devi; Rajya Lakshmi Devi
- Issue: Surendra Bikram Shah; Upendra Bikram Shah; Ranendra Bikram Shah; Birendra Bikram Shah
Regnal name
- Shree Paanch Maharajadhiraj Rajendra Bikram Shah Dev
- Dynasty: Shah
- Father: Girvan Yuddha Bikram Shah
- Mother: Gorakshya Rajya Lakshmi Devi
- Religion: Hinduism

Rajendra Bikram Shah (Nepali: श्री ५ महाराजाधिराज राजेन्द्र विक्रम शाह देव; 3 December 1813 – 10 July 1881) was King of Nepal. His reign saw the rise of the Ranas; in 1846, Jung Bahadur Rana came to power as prime minister and the next year, Rajendra was forced to abdicate in favor of his son, Surendra, by Junga Bahadur Rana.

== Early life ==
He became king at age three on the death of his father Girvan Yuddha Bikram Shah Deva. As had been the case with his father, most of Rajendra's rule was under the regency of his step-grandmother Queen Lalit Tripura Sundari Devi (died 1832) and Prime Minister Bhimsen Thapa. As regent, Bhimsen Thapa kept the king in isolation—he did not even have the freedom to leave the palace without permission.

== Reign ==
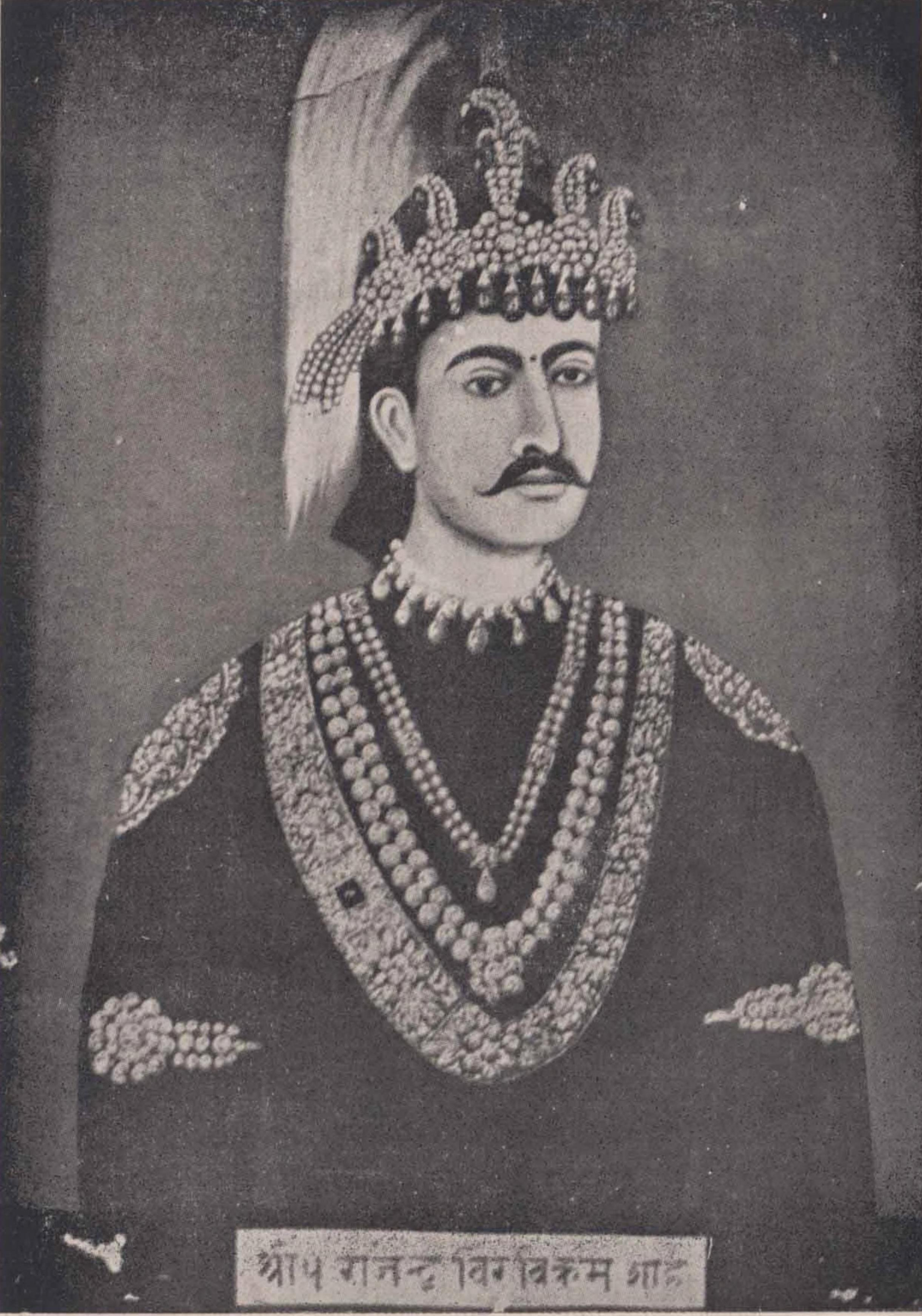
Rajendra Bikram Shah, 1831

Rajendra came of age in 1832, and in 1837 announced his intention to rule independently of the prime minister. He stripped Bhimsen Thapa and Thapa's nephew, Mathabar Singh, of their military authority. Shortly afterward the youngest son of Rajendra's elder queen died, and Bhimsen Thapa was arrested on a trumped-up charge of poisoning the prince. All the property of the Thapas was confiscated. Bhimsen Thapa was acquitted after an eight-month trial, but the Thapas were in disarray. When Rana Jang Pandey became prime minister, he reimprisoned Bhimsen Thapa, who committed suicide in prison in 1839.

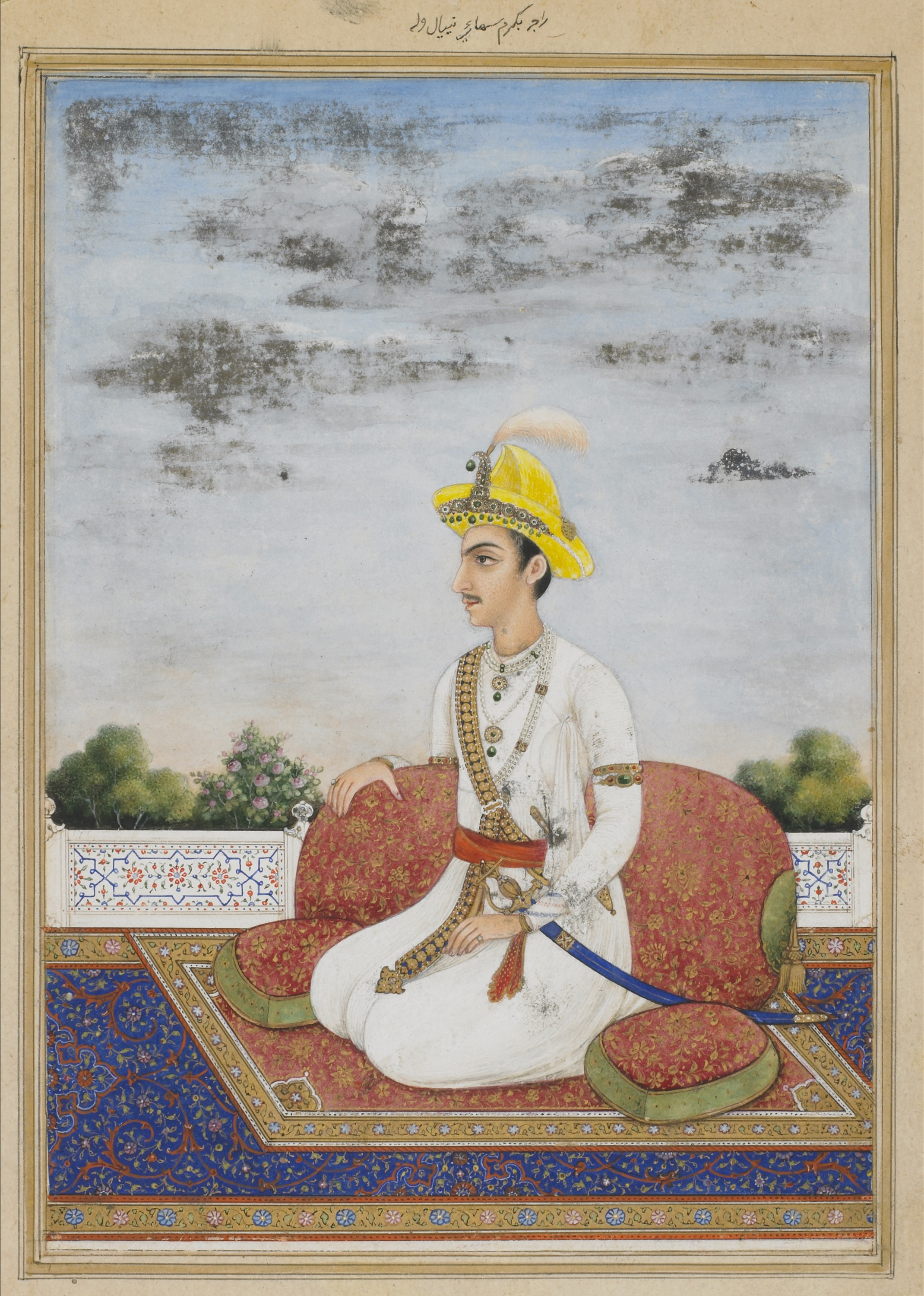
राजा राजेन्द्र विक्रम शाह

King Rajendra is generally described as a weak, incapable and indecisive ruler. He decided to stay out of all the ruling activities and from 1839 to 1841, his senior wife Queen Samrajya was the de facto regent of Nepal. After the senior queen died in 1841, the junior queen, Queen Rajya Lakshmi, became the de facto regent.

In January 1843, Rajendra declared that he would rule the country only with advice and agreement of his junior queen, Rajyalakshmi, and commanded his subjects to obey her even over his own son, Surendra Bikram Shah. Continued infighting among noble factions led eventually to the Kot Massacre in 1846.

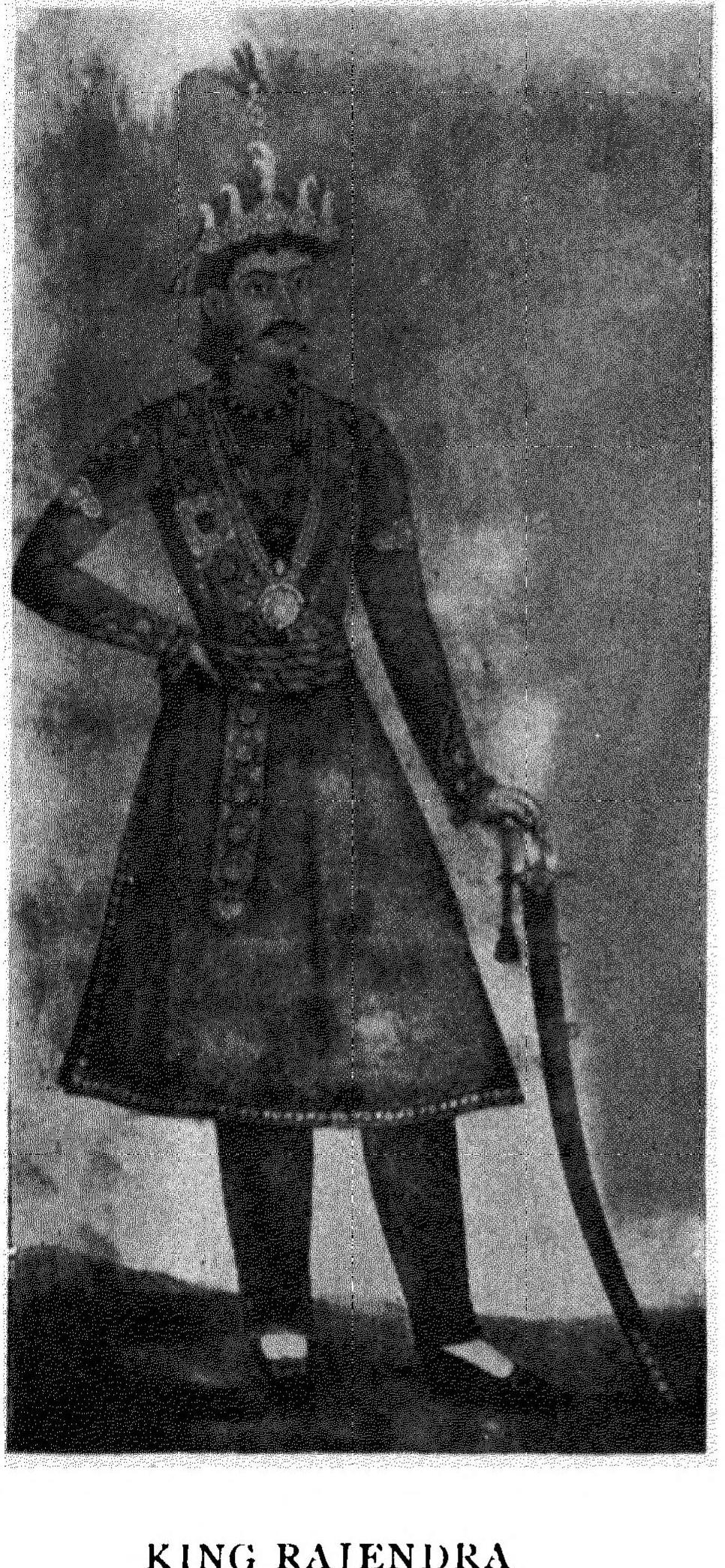
Rajendra Bikram Shah

== Rise of the Ranas ==
Bal Narsingh Kunwar (Junga Bahadur Rana) (Nepali: बल नरसिंह कुँवर (जंगबहादुर राणा)) began the Rana dynasty. He came to power through the 1846 Kot massacre (Nepali: कोत पर्व, Kot Parwa) where 36 members of the palace court including the Prime Minister and a relative of the King, Chautariya Fate Janga Shah, were murdered.

King Rajendra was insulted and his trusted officer, Sardar Bhawani Singh Khatri was beheaded. His junior wife, Queen Rajyalakshmi, had thought that Jung Bahadur Rana would help her to ensure that her son Prince Ranendra succeeds to the throne but Jung Bahadur had made her believe so for his own motives. Queen Rajyalakshmi was enraged and started plotting to kill Jung Bahadur but the plot was revealed. Queen Rajyalakshmi and her two sons were exiled, and King Rajendra accompanied them, for pilgrimage in Varanasi. In his absence, Crown Prince Surendra was made the Prince Regent. From exile, Rajendra sought to regain power by creating and mobilizing an army, but Jung Bahadur learned of Rajendra's plans and attacked his camp in Alau. He was captured while trying to flee and forced to abdicate the throne in favor of his son Surendra.

== Later life ==
Jung Bahadur's forces captured Rajendra in 1847 and brought him to Bhaktapur and later he was permitted to stay in Hanuman Dhoka Palace.

Jung Bahadur Rana arranged it so that nobody could meet the ex-King Rajendra without his permission. He made sure that Rajendra's second son, Prince Upendra, could not visit Rajendra without the consent of the minister. King Surendra had to visit his father once every month. However, Jung Bahadur made sure that the ex-king Rajendra could not be consulted on any foreign and domestic affairs, and he was not permitted to leave the durbar without the consent of the king. For the rest of his life, Rajendra lived under house arrest.

He died in the Bhaktapur Durbar Square on 10 July 1881 at the age of 67 during the time of the reign of his great-grandson.

== See also ==
- Nepali Mandir

== External links/sources ==
- Royal Court of Nepal -- official site
- Rajendra Bikram Shah biography - Nepal Home Page
- Library of Congress Country Studies: Nepal

Rajendra Bikram Shah Shah dynasty Born: 3 December 1813 Died: 10 July 1881
Regnal titles
Preceded by Girvan Yuddha Bikram Shah Deva	King of Nepal; 1816–1847	Succeeded by Surendra Bikram Shah
