= Upendra Bikram Shah =

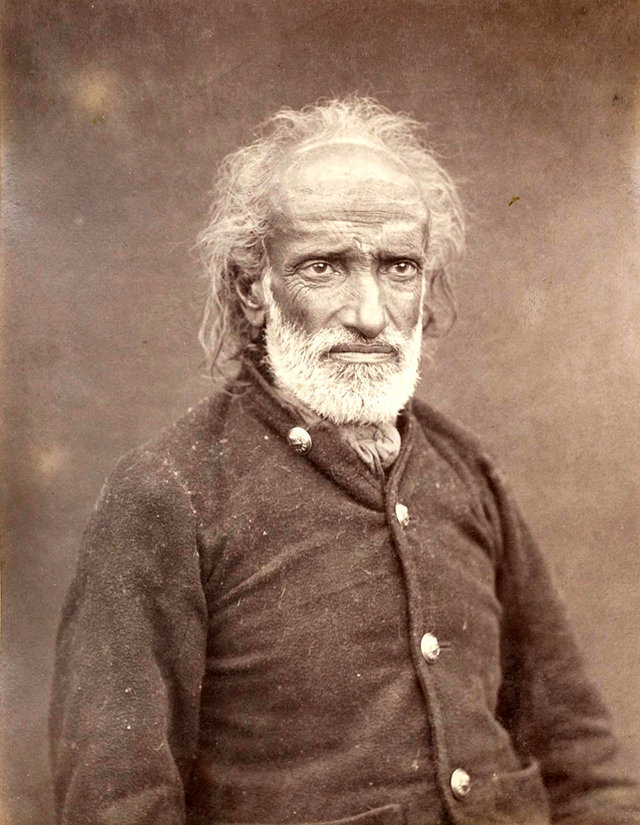
- Upendra Bikram Shah in the 1870s
- Born: Hanuman Dhoka, Kathmandu, Kingdom of Nepal
Names
- Sri Adhirajkumar Upendra Bir Bikram Shah
- Nepali: उपेन्द्र विक्रम शाह
- Dynasty: Shah dynasty
- Father: Rajendra Bikram Shah
- Mother: Samrajya Lakshmi Devi
- Religion: Hinduism

Upendra Bikram Shah (Nepali: उपेन्द्र विक्रम शाह; sometimes known as Mahila Sahibju) was a Nepalese prince.

== Biography ==
Upendra Bikram Shah was born in Hanuman Dhoka to King Rajendra Bikram Shah and Maharani Samrajya Lakshmi Devi. His mother is sometimes called one of the most powerful queens in the history of Nepal.

Shah was sent into Allahabad, British India for conspiring against Jung Bahadur Rana.

In 1854, Shah was given the Bagh Durbar, where, he was later put under house arrest for treason.

He died in Bikram Sambat 1896. Upendra Bikram Shah was also a Tantrik.
