= Samrajya Lakshmi Devi =

Samrajya
- Queen consort of Nepal; Queen regent of Nepal
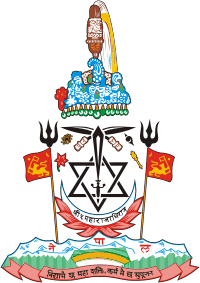
- Born: ca. 1814; Gorakhpur, British India (present-day Uttar Pradesh, India)
- Died: 6 October 1841 (aged 26–27); Pashupatinath, Kingdom of Nepal
- Spouse: Rajendra of Nepal
- Issue: King Surendra; Prince Upendra
Names
- Samrajya Lakshmi Devi
- Dynasty: House of Shah (by marriage)
- Father: Thakur Prabhu Chand
- Mother: Chaurasi Kumari Devi
- Religion: Hinduism

Samrajya Lakshmi Devi (c. 1814 – 6 October 1841) was, as the senior wife of King Rajendra of Nepal, a queen consort of Nepal. She was the mother of King Surendra and Prince Upendra.

Samrajya was the de facto regent from 1839 to 1841. She died of malaria on 6 October 1841.

== Life ==
She was very anxious about the power asserted by the Mukhtiyar Bhimsen Thapa. She harassed the King Rajendra Bikram Shah to put an end to the power of the Mukhtiyar:

"You have given him a sunnad making once for all everything to the Minister, who with his family and creatures eat us all so that neither have we any right nor even means to provide for our children. You are no Raja, others rule and spend, you have your mere gaddi and a mouthful to eat. Such too is my share and your children."

== Books ==
- Pradhan, Kumar L. (2012), Thapa Politics in Nepal: With Special Reference to Bhim Sen Thapa, 1806–1839, New Delhi: Concept Publishing Company, p. 278, ISBN 9788180698132

Royal titles
Preceded by Gorakshya	Queen consort of Nepal; 1824–1841	Succeeded by Rajya
