= Rajya Lakshmi Devi =

Rajya Lakshmi
- Queen consort of Nepal; Queen regent of Nepal
- Born: ca. 1814; Gorakhpur, British India (present-day Uttar Pradesh, India)
- Died: before 1900; Mahamurganj, Varanasi, British India (present-day Uttar Pradesh, India)
- Spouse: King Rajendra
- Issue: Ranendra Bir Bikram Shah; Birendra Bir Bikram Shah
Names
- Rajya Lakshmi Devi
- Dynasty: Shah dynasty (by marriage)
- Religion: Hinduism

Rajya Lakshmi Devi (Nepali राज्यलक्ष्मी देवी) (ca. 1814 – before 1900) was a queen consort of Nepal as the junior wife of King Rajendra of Nepal.

In 1843, Queen Rajya Lakshmi was made the queen regent and co-regent of her husband. Queen Rajya Lakshmi wanted to have her son, Prince Ranendra, to be crowned the next king instead of her stepson Surendra Bikram Shah. She was somewhat responsible for the Kot massacre in 1846, which initiated the 104-year rule of the Rana dynasty in Nepal.

== Early life and background ==
Rajya Lakshmi Devi was born around 1814. She was from Gorakpur, India.

== Queen of Nepal ==
She was married to King Rajendra on February 5, 1824. They had two sons, Ranendra and Birendra.

Queen Rajya Lakshmi was described as ambitious for power. Her husband was usually described as an incapable ruler, and his senior wife, Queen Samrajya, was the de facto regent from 1839 to 1841. After her death in 1841, Queen Rajya Lakshmi was the de facto regent, and in 1843, she was officially made the Queen regent.

Rajya Lakshmi wanted her own son, Prince Ranendra, to become the next king. Jung Bahadur Kunwar might have promised to help her, but in doing this, he had his own motives.

=== Kot massacre ===
Gagan Singh Bhandari, a favorite of Queen Rajya Lakshmi and whom the queen had hoped to use to elevate her son as the king, was found dead. The queen gave orders for the entire administrative establishment of the country to be brought immediately at the courtyard of the palace armoury. Then the queen ordered the man she suspected to be the murderer of Gagan Singh to be executed. After a chaotic situation broke out, Jung Bahadur used the situation for his own advantage and eliminated many nobles.

=== Aftermath of the Kot massacre ===
Following the Kot massacre, Jung Bahadur Kunwar declared himself the prime minister. Queen Rajya Lakshmi- who had always trusted Jung- was begun to be shown disrespect and even the king was insulted. Enraged and insecure, the queen plotted to have Jung killed, but the plot was soon revealed. Jung Bahadur thought that the queen might be a threat to him. He accused the queen of actually plotting to kill the then Crown Prince Surendra and his younger brother, Prince Upendra so that her own son, Prince Ranendra, could become the next king. Jung had royal pandits read out the accusation. Ultimately, the queen and her two sons were exiled to India. King Rajendra accompanied them, and later tried to overthrow Jung Bahadur, but the king was defeated, kept under house arrest, and Prince Surendra was made the new king in 1847. The former king Rajendra continued to live in house arrest until his death in 1881.

== Exile and death ==
Rajya Lakshmi continued to live in Varanasi. Jung Bahadur Rana visited Europe in 1850, and on his way back he visited Varanasi, where Rajya Lakshmi, along with her two sons, met him with submission.

Rajya Lakshmi must have died sometime before 1900.

Royal titles
Preceded by Samrajya	Queen consort of Nepal; 1841–1847	Succeeded by Trailokya
