= Second Fateh Jung Shah ministry =

Government of Nepal from 1845 to 1846

Second Fateh Jung Shah Ministry
- Council of Bharadars of Kingdom of Nepal
- Date formed: September 1845
- Date dissolved: 14 September 1846

People and organisations
- Head of state: King Rajendra of Nepal
- Head of government: Fateh Jung Shah
- Deputy head of government: Gagan Singh Bhandari
- Member party: Non-partisan

History
- Predecessor: Government of Mathabarsingh Thapa
- Successor: Government of Jang Bahadur Rana

Second Fateh Jung Shah Ministry or Second Government of Fateh Jung Shah or Fateh Jung Shah's Second Council of Bharadars was the council of the Bharadars (equivalent to the ministry or the government of Nepal) which was formed in September 1845 (Ashwin 1902) after the assassination of Mukhtiyar Mathabarsingh Thapa. The ministry was led by Fateh Jung Shah in his second term as Mukhtiyar (Prime Minister) of Nepal. However, the virtual Prime Minister was Kaji Gagan Singh Bhandari who had stronghold over large number of military forces than the Mukhtiyar. This council of ministers was dissolved due to the murder of entire council members on 14 September 1846 by the only surviving member Jang Bahadur Kunwar; the incident known as the Kot Massacre.

== The Council ==
The ministry of the Kingdom of Nepal formed in September 1845 (Ashwin 1902) after the death of Prime Minister Mathabarsingh Thapa included Chautariya Fateh Jung Shah, Gagan Singh Bhandari, Abhiman Singh Rana Magar and Dalbhanjan Pande. Kaji Jang Bahadur Kunwar was also reinstated to his post as Kaji and General with 3 regiments under him in the council. (Note: Jang Bahadur Kunwar was appointed to the rank of Kaji after the assassination of Mathabar Singh Thapa.)

Fateh Jung Shah, King Rajendra's favourite courtier, was appointed as Mukhtiyar with control over Western Commands of the Nepalese Army, Department of Foreign Affairs and a direct administration of three military regiments. Gagan Singh Bhandari, the Junior Queen Rajya Lakshmi's favourite courtier, became the most influential member in the State Council where he received direct control of seven military regiments and was assigned the responsibility of supervision over all the arsenals and magazines in the country. He was also assigned the direct administration of the Kathmandu Valley. Abhiman Singh Rana Magar was appointed with the control over the Eastern Commands of the Nepalese Army with personal control of two regiments. Dalbhanjan Pande was awarded the rank of General along with the one regiment of soldiers under his administration. Fateh Jung, Abhiman Singh and Dalbhanjan were inclined to King Rajendra while Gagan Singh was inclined to Junior Queen Rajya Laxmi. However, Jang Bahadur acted neutral to both factions.

=== List of ministers ===
| Portfolio | Minister | Military Regiments Received | Term |
|---|---|---|---|
| Mukhtiyar; Head of the Council of Bharadars; Mul Chautariya (head of all royal ministers); Head of the Western Commands of the Nepalese Army; Department of Foreign Affairs | Fateh Jung Shah | 3 regiments | 1845–1846 |
| Head of the Military Inventory of the Nepalese Army; Head of the Administration of the Kathmandu Valley; Member of the Council of Bharadars | Gagan Singh Bhandari | 7 regiments | 1845–1846 |
| Head of the Eastern Commands of the Nepalese Army; Muluki Dewan (Head of the Department of Home Affairs); Member of the Council of Bharadars | Abhiman Singh Rana Magar | 2 regiments | 1845–1846 |
| Member of the Council of Bharadars | Jang Bahadur Kunwar | 3 regiments | 1845–1846 |
| Member of the Council of Bharadars | Dalbhanjan Pande | 1 regiment | 1845–1846 |

== Dissolution ==
On 31st Bhadra 1902 (September 1846) around 10 pm, Gagan Singh Bhandari was killed in his prayer room at home by a Maithil Brahmin assassin named Lal Jha. Historian Baburam Acharya opines that Lal Jha was most probably supplied with guns and ammunition by Jang Bahadur Kunwar. It was also rumoured that Mukhtiyar Fateh Jung Shah had helped the King in selecting an assassin for Gagan Singh. The investigation of the murder of Gagan Singh led to the Kot Massacre on 14 September 1846 where all the members of the council were killed with the exception of Jang Bahadur Kunwar. Jang Bahadur, his brothers and aides conducted the massacre and afterwards received high posts in the new government.

== Books ==
- Acharya, Baburam (2019). Acharya, Shrikrishna (ed.). Aba Yasto Kahilyai Nahos (in Nepali). Kathmandu: Fine Print Books. ISBN 978-9937-665-40-7.
- Joshi, Bhuwan Lal; Rose, Leo E. (1966), Democratic Innovations in Nepal: A Case Study of Political Acculturation, University of California Press
- Karmacharya, Ganga (2005), Queens in Nepalese Politics: an account of roles of Nepalese queens in state affairs, 1775-1846, Nepal: Educational Publishing House, ISBN 9789994633937
