= Execution of Damodar Pande =

Mulkaji of Nepal

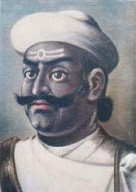
Portrait of Mulkaji Damodar Pande (1752–1804).

Damodar Pande was the Mulkaji of Nepal (equivalent to Prime Minister of Nepal) from 1803 to 1804 and the most influential Kaji between 1794 and 1804. Ex-King of Nepal Rana Bahadur Shah returned to Nepal from his exile in British India and arrested the members of Pandey faction at Thankot, Kathmandu where they were waiting to greet the ex-King with state honors and take the mentally unstable ex-King into isolation. On March 13, 1804, Rana Bahadur ordered the execution of Damodar Pande along with his two eldest and innocent sons (Ranakeshar and Gajakeshar Pande) without a fair trial to avenge his exiled stay (1800-1804) in British India. The younger sons of Damodar, Karbir Pande and Rana Jang Pande, fled to India in the aftermath.

== Background ==
After the inevitable death of Queen Kantavati Devi, King Rana Bahadur Shah suffered a mental breakdown during which he lashed out by desecrating temples and cruelly punishing the attendant physicians and astrologers. He then renounced his ascetic life and attempted to re-assert his royal authority. Since most of the military officers had sided with the courtiers, Rana Bahadur realized that his authority could not be re-established; and he was forced to flee to the British-controlled city of Varanasi in May 1800. The Kathmandu Durbar was willing to appease the British and agreed to sign a commercial treaty so long as the wayward Rana Bahadur and his group were held in India under strict British surveillance. On 28 October 1801, a Treaty of Commerce and Alliance was signed by Guru Gajraj Mishra, on the behalf of Nepal Durbar, and Charles Crawford, on the behalf of East India Company, in Danapur, India. Among the articles in the treaty, it decided on perpetual peace and friendship between the two states, on the pension for Rana Bahadur Shah, the establishment of a British Residency in Kathmandu, and an establishment of trade relations between the two states. The Treaty of 1801 between British East India Company and Kingdom of Nepal was unilaterally annulled by the British on 24 January 1804. The suspension of diplomatic ties also gave the Governor General of India a pretext to allow the ex-King Rana Bahadur to return to Nepal unconditionally.

== Execution ==
Rana Bahadur and his group proceeded towards Kathmandu. Some troops were sent by Kathmandu Durbar to check their progress, but the troops changed their allegiance when they came face to face with the ex-King. Damodar Pande and his men were arrested at Thankot where they were waiting to greet the ex-King with state honors and take him into isolation. After Rana Bahadur's reinstatement to power, he started to extract vengeance on those who had tried to keep him in exile. He exiled Queen Raj Rajeshwari Devi to Helambu, where she became a Buddhist nun, on the charge of siding with Damodar Pande and colluding with the British. Damodar Pande, along with his two eldest sons namely Ranakeshar and Gajakeshar, who were completely innocent, was executed on 13 March 1804; similarly some members of his faction were tortured and executed without any due trial, while many others managed to escape to India. Among those who managed to escape to India were Damodar Pande's sons Karbir Pande and Rana Jang Pande.

== Aftermath ==
Rana Bahadur also punished those who did not help him while in exile. Among them was Prithvi Pal Sen, the king of Palpa, who was tricked into imprisonment, while his kingdom forcefully annexed. Queen Subarna Prabha Devi and her supporters were released and given a general pardon. Those who had helped Rana Bahadur to return to Kathmandu were lavished with rank, land, and wealth. Bhimsen Thapa was made a second kaji; Ranajit Pande, who was the father-in-law of Bhimsen's brother, was made the Mulkaji; Sher Bahadur Shah, Rana Bahadur's half-brother, was made the Mul Chautariya; while Rangnath Paudel was made the Raj Guru (royal spiritual preceptor).
