= Lakhan Thapa =

Nepali revolutionary

Lakhan Thapa Magar
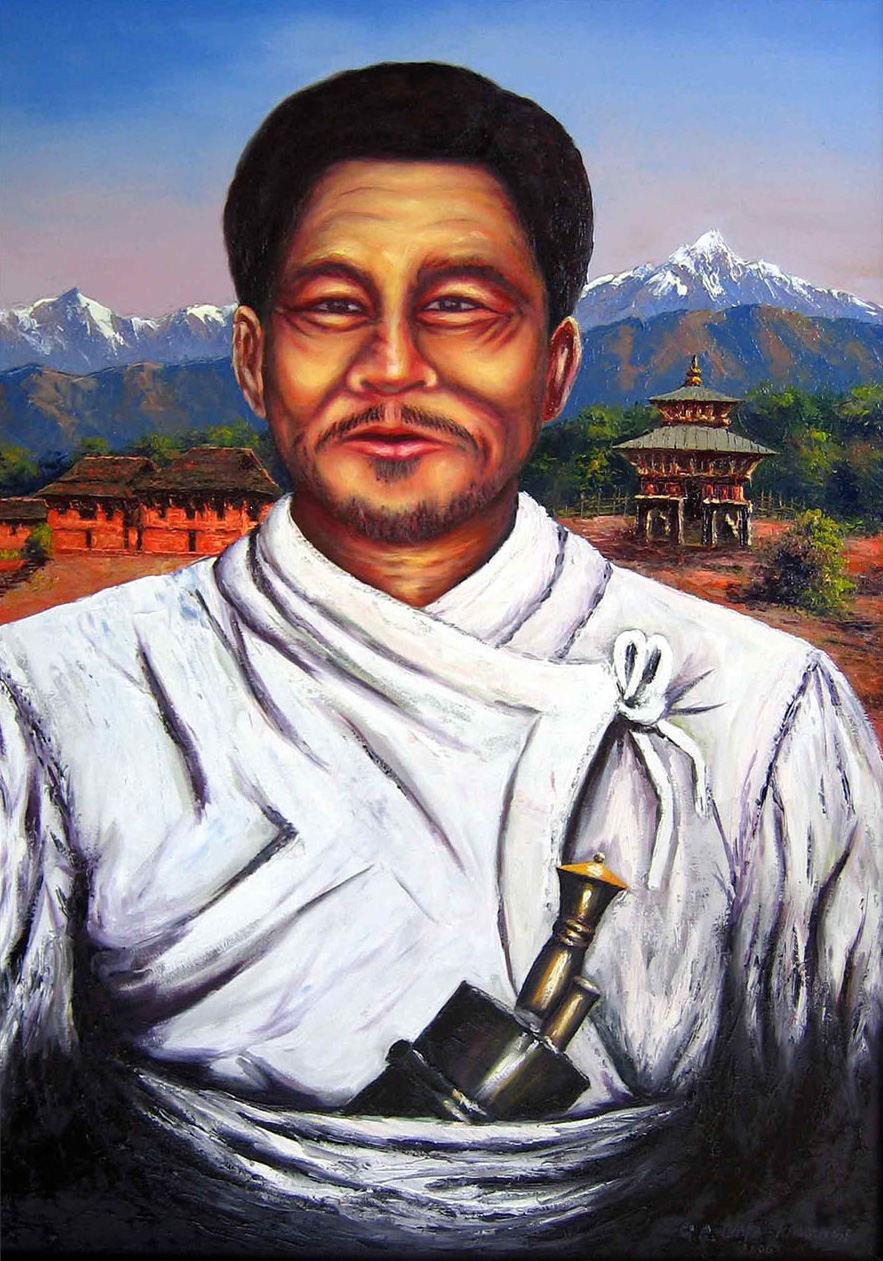
- Born: 1835, Bungkot, Gorkha District, Kingdom of Nepal
- Died: 14 February 1877 (aged 41–42), Bungkot, Gorkha District, Kingdom of Nepal
- Martyred by: Jung Bahadur Rana
- Means of martyrdom: Hanging
- Venerated in: Nepal

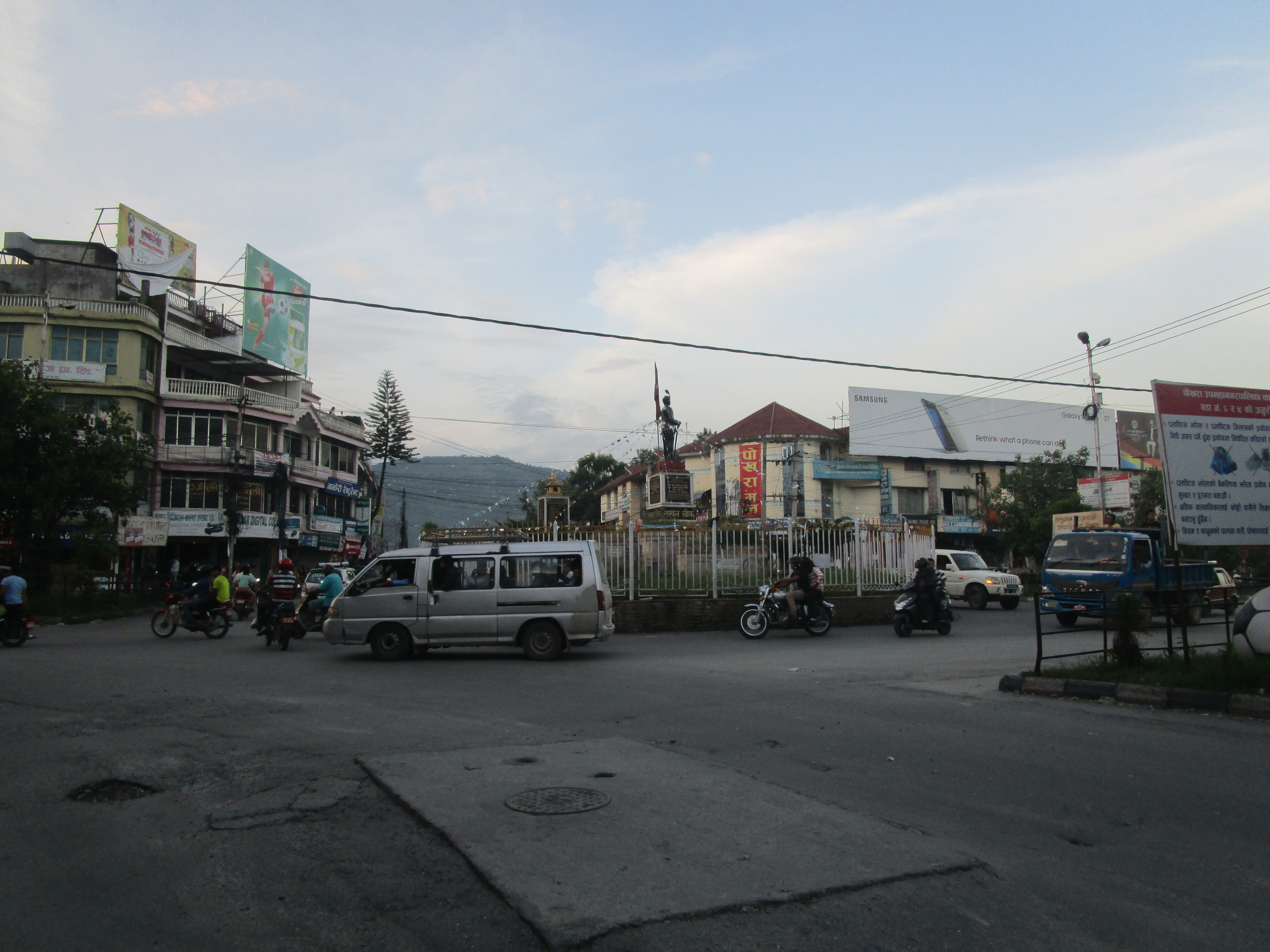
Lakhan Chowk at Pokhara

Lakhan Thapa Magar (1835–1877) was a Nepali revolutionary and local leader in Bungkot, Gorkha District who led a rebellion against Jung Bahadur Rana's authority and the overall rule of the Rana dynasty. The Nepalese government considers him as "the First Martyr of Nepal."

== Kot Massacre of 1846 ==
The Kot Massacre, an internal revolt which occurred on 14 September 1846, led to the death of the king and queen and the establishment of Rana rule in Nepal for over a century. The reigning queen initiated an investigation into the assassination of General Gagan Singh Bhandari. General Abhiman Singh Rana Magar, the first Commander-in-Chief of the Nepali Army, knew the assassin's identity. However, before he could reveal it, Junga Bahadur Rana fatally shot him in an effort to consolidate power. The general, as he died, revealed the assassin's name, and Jung Bahadur Rana subsequently eliminated numerous nobles and political figures, including Lakhan Thapa Magar, to secure his authority.

== Resistance ==
Following the Rana takeover, Lakhan Thapa Magar mobilized local youths and former military personnel to oppose the government. He gathered resources, including weapons and supplies, to initiate an armed rebellion, prompting the Rana administration to deploy troops to Gorkha. Junga Bahadur Rana ordered the capture and execution of Thapa Magar and his supporters. On 14 February 1877, Lakhan Thapa Magar was hanged in front of his residence in Bungkot. Seven of his associates were also executed near the Manakamana Temple.

Thapa Magar's status as a martyrdom remains a subject of historical debate. A descendant of Jung Bahadur Rana has contested the claim, but many Nepali historians assert that Thapa Magar was executed for his resistance.

== Legacy ==
Lakhan Thapa Magar's historical significance was reexamined in the 1990s, during which his image underwent rehabilitation. Historian Janak Lal Sharma, a former Director General of Nepal's Department of Archaeology, argued that the oppressive rule of Jung Bahadur Rana made rebellion inevitable. Some historians have compared Thapa Magar to Indian revolutionary Bhagat Singh, as both are considered political martyrs in their respective countries.

== Family tree ==
- Ram Thapa Magar (elder brother)
- Dhana Mala (sister)
