= Bir Keshar Pande =

Nobleman and military commander of Nepal, killed during the 1846 Kot massacre

Kaji Bir Keshar Pande
- श्री कपर्दार वीर केशर पाँडे

Personal details
- Died: 14 September 1846 Kot Arsenal, Basantapur Darbar
- Children: Uday Bahadur; Colonel Shamsher Bahadur
- Parent: Kaji Ranajit Pande (father)
- Relatives: Bamsa Raj Pande (cousin-uncle); Damodar Pande (cousin-uncle); Ranajit Pande (father); Mathabarsingh Thapa (nephew); Rana Jang Pande (second-cousin)

Military service
- Allegiance: Kingdom of Nepal Nepal
- Branch/service: Nepal Army
- Rank: Kapardar
- Battles/wars: Anglo-Nepalese War

Kaji Bir Keshar Pande (Nepali: वीर केशर पाँडे) a Nepalese politician, military personnel and courtier in the Kingdom of Nepal. He was member of the Gora Pande clan of Gorkha and the son of Kaji Ranajit Pande. Bir Keshar Pande was the owner of Lazimpat Durbar. As Thapathali was abode of the Thapas, Lazimpat was abode of Pande family. At the time of the Kot massacre on 14 September 1846, Lazimpat Durbar was owned by Kaji Bir Keshar Pande and was massacred there. After which lazimpat Durbar was occupied by Kaji Mama Col.Tribikram Singh Thapa for 28 years until he left for Varanasi in 1875.

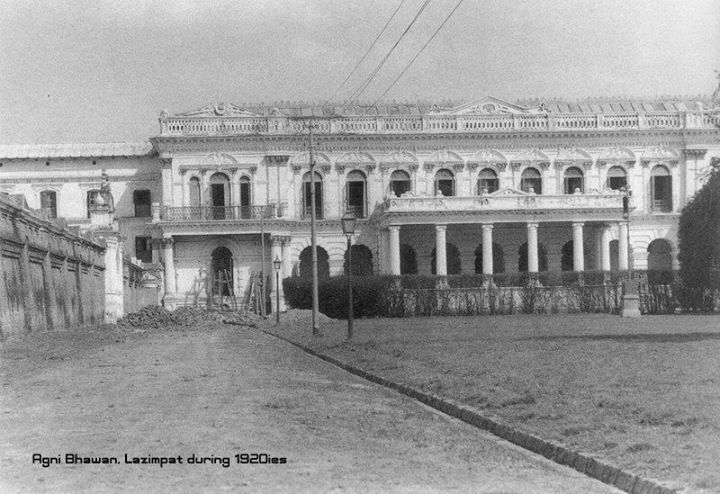
Lazimpat Durbar of Kaji Bir Keshar Pande (Later known as Agni Bhawan) after 1964

== Family ==
He was the son of Kaji Ranajit Pande of Gora (White) Pande faction belonging to Pande family. He was grandson of Kaji Tularam Pande who died in the Battle of Kathmandu. His father Ranajit Pande was once a Mulkaji while the other uncle Bhotu Pande was a military officer in the offence of Sino-Nepalese War.

== Kot Massacre ==
Raged by the news of her beloved and trustworthy general, Queen Rajya Lakshmi Devi vowed to punish the culprit. She immediately ordered all the noblemen and parties for an emergency inquiry. This gathering followed one of the worst massacres in the history of Nepal, called the Kot Massacre of September 14, 1846 that catapulted the Ranas into power. The queen suspected Kapardar Bir Keshar Pande for the killing of her secret lover and ordered Abhiman Singh Rana Magar, the then Commander-in-chief of Nepal Army, to kill the Pande leader. However having known the real culprit, he hesitated in doing so. Fighting broke out in the crowd, and he was wounded by a shot at his chest by Jung Bahadur Rana. The dying General Abhiman Singh Rana Magar, shouted, "Junge(aka Jung Bahadur) was the killer of Gagan Singh"("गगन सिंहको हत्त्यारा जंगे नै हो").

During the free-for-all that followed, swords and knives were used on all sides. Through some scheme that has never been explained adequately, the only leader with organized bodies of troops in the kot area was Jang Bahadur, whose troops suppressed the fighting, killing many of his opponents in the process. When the struggle subsided, the courtyard was strewn with the bodies of dozens of leading nobles and an unknown number of their followers The Pande and Thapa families in particular were devastated during this slaughter. That followed a seek and destroy approach taken by Jung Bahadur Rana against all nobles in the royal house and other in the country, that included many ethnic leaders as well.

== Relation with the Thapas ==
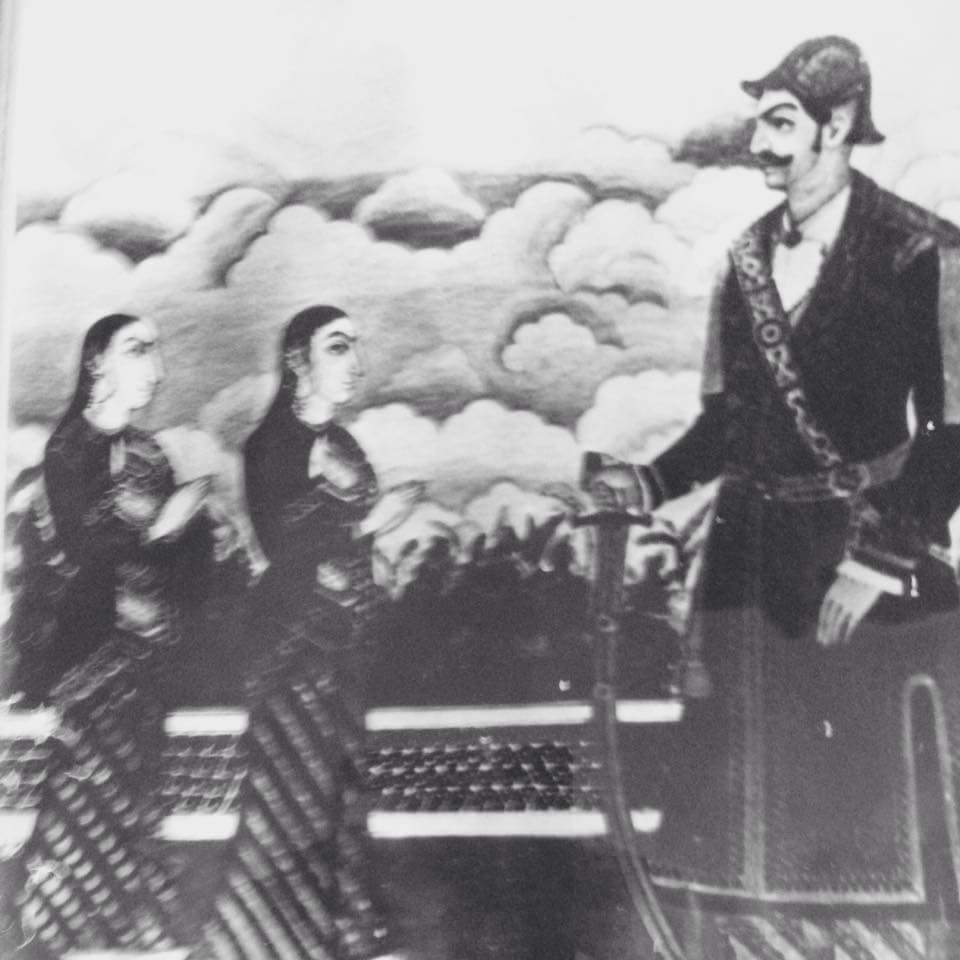
Bhimsen Thapa and his two wives

Bhimsen Thapa had three wives as per the stone inscription of Bhimbishwar Mahadev temple at Bungkot. His only son died at a young age in 1796 and his three daughters – Lalita Devi, Janak Kumari, and Dirgha Kumari were married to Pande nobles – Uday Bahadur Pande, Shamsher Bahadur Pande and Dal Bahadur Pande respectively. Uday Bahadur and Colonel Shamsher Bahadur were the sons of Kaji Bir Keshar Pande and Sardar Dal Bahadur was the son of Bir Keshar's cousin Garud Dhoj Pande, who were son of MulKaji Ranajit Pande.

== Bibliography ==
- Acharya, Baburam (2012), Acharya, Shri Krishna (ed.), Janaral Bhimsen Thapa : Yinko Utthan Tatha Pattan (in Nepali), Kathmandu: Education Book House, p. 228, ISBN 9789937241748
- Karmacharya, Ganga (2005), Queens in Nepalese Politics: an account of roles of Nepalese queens in state affairs, 1775-1846, Nepal: Educational Publishing House, ISBN 9789994633937
- Nepal, Gyanmani (2007), Nepal ko Mahabharat (in Nepali) (3rd ed.), Kathmandu: Sajha, p. 314, ISBN 9789993325857
- Pradhan, Kumar L. (2012), Thapa Politics in Nepal: With Special Reference to Bhim Sen Thapa, 1806–1839, New Delhi: Concept Publishing Company, p. 278, ISBN 9788180698132
- Whelpton, John (1991). Kings, soldiers, and priests: Nepalese politics and the rise of Jang Bahadur Rana, 1830–1857. Manohar Publications. p. 254. ISBN 9788185425641.
