= Takam Kingdom =

Historical Nepalese kingdom (1189 CE – 1488 CE)

Takam Bagalya Kingdom Takam Rajya ताकम राज्य
- 1189 CE–1488 CE
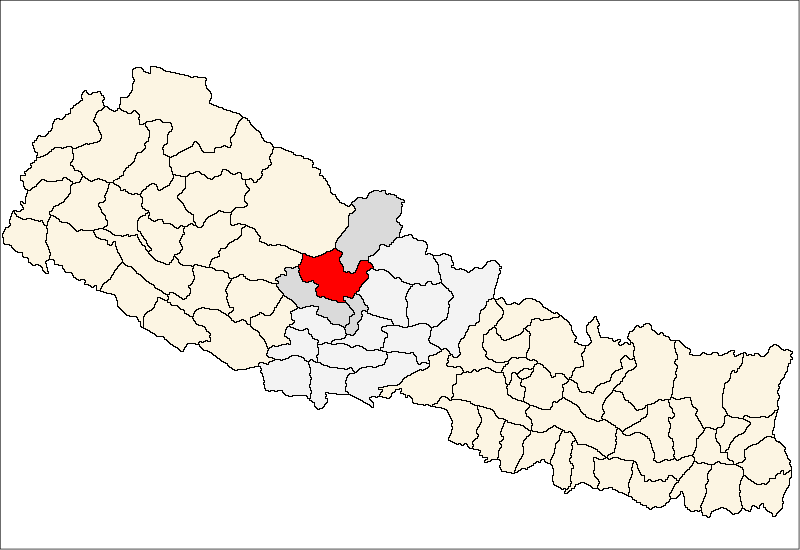
- Present Myagdi District and the-then 4000 Parvat of Bagalya Thapas; Takam kingdom falls on then 4000 Parvat of Bagalya Thapas
- Capital: Takam
- Common languages: Khas language
- Religion: Hinduism
- Government: Absolute Monarchy
- Maharaja
  - 1189–: Kalu Thapa Kshatri
- Tarapati Thapa
- History
  - Established: 1189 CE
  - Disestablished: 1488 CE
Succeeded by
Kingdom of Parbat

Takam Kingdom (Nepali: ताकम राज्य) was a region administrated by the Thapas which turned into a Chaubise Parbat State ruled by King Dimba Bam of Samalvanshi Malla clan.

It was later merged to Kingdom of Nepal on 14 Ashoj 1843 BS by the Gorkhali army under the leadership of Amar Singh Thapa, Yog Narayan Malla, Damodar Pande and Jiba Shah. The present day Takam VDC lies in the region.

== Gallery ==
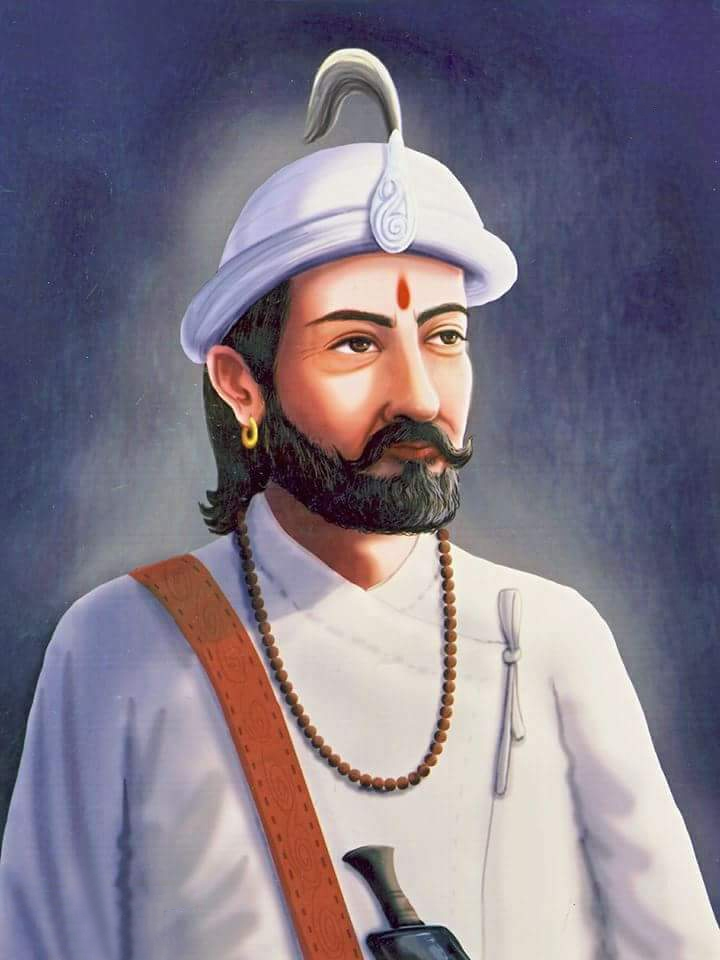
King Kalu Thapa Kshatri, founder of Takam kingdom

== See also ==
- Gorkha Kingdom
- Khasa Kingdom
