= Paudel =

- Pronunciation: /ˈpaʊ.dəl/

Origin
- Meaning: Toponymic surname from Pauri, India

Other names
- Variant forms: Paudel, Paudyal, Poudel, Poudyal
- See also: Aryal, Sigdel, Khadka, Pokharel

Paudel (Nepali: पौडेल, pouḍel), also spelled as Poudel, Paudyal, and Poudyal is a surname found among the Bahun or Hill Brahmin people of western Nepal. It derives from the town of Paudhi in Uttarakhand, India.

== Notable people ==
- Ananta Prasad Paudel, Nepali politician
- Bal Chandra Poudel, Nepali politician
- Bharat Mani Paudel, Nepali comedian and winner of Comedy Champion season 2
- Bishnu Prasad Paudel, Nepali politician
- Dilip Kumar Poudel, Nepali politician and former Chief Justice of Nepal
- Khadak Raj Paudel, Nepali writer, politician, and Minister of Culture, Tourism, and Civil Aviation since 2026
- Lekhnath Paudyal, renowned Nepali poet
- Madonath Paudel, Nepali author and politician
- Prakash Sharma Poudel, Nepali politician
- Purusottam Poudel, Nepali politician
- Rajaram Poudel, Nepali actor and comedian
- Ram Chandra Paudel, President of Nepal since 2023
- Ranga Nath Poudyal, Prime Minister of Nepal during the reign of King Rajendra Bikram Shah
- Rohit Kumar Paudel, captain of the Nepal national cricket team
- Shivahari Poudel, Nepali actor and comedian
- Usha Poudel, Nepali actress and dancer
- Vrajanath Poudyal, Nepali courtier in Shah dynasty of the Kingdom of Nepal
