= Sigdel =

Sigdel सिग्देल
- Language: Nepali

Origin
- Language: Sanskrit
- Region of origin: Nepal

Other names
- See also: Paudel, Pokharel, Khadka

Sigdel (Nepali: सिग्देल) is a Hindu surname found in Nepal. Sigdel surname falls under Atreya clan (lineage of Sage Atri) like other surnames such as Paudel and Bagale Thapa and is commonly used by Bahuns and also Chhetris. People with this surname are living in different belts of Nepal such as Bomatar, Kihun, Bhimad, Tanahun, Nuwakot, Palpa, Bardiya, Jhapa, Biratnagar, Makwanpur and Kavre.

Notable people with surname Sigdel include:

- Aaryan Sigdel, Nepalese actor
- Priya Sigdel, Nepalese beauty pageant titleholder
- Ashok Raj Sigdel, Chief of the Army Staff, Nepal
- Somnath Sigdel, Nepalese Renowned Scholar and Author
- Raj Sigdel, Nepalese singer, music composer, songwriter

== See also ==
- List of most common surnames in Asia
