= Lazimpat Durbar =

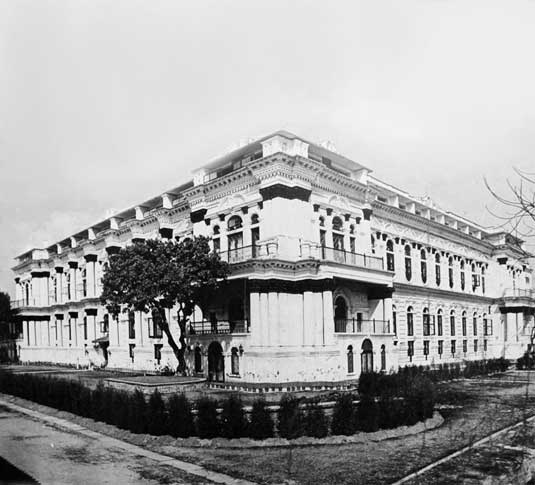
- Reverse angle of Lajimpat Durbar (Then known as Agni Bhawan)

General information
- Architectural style: Neoclassical architecture and European styles of architecture
- Location: Kathmandu, Nepal
- Completed: 1894
- Cost: Unknown
- Client: Kaji Bir Keshar Pande, Bir Shumsher JBR

Technical details
- Structural system: Brick and Mortar

Design and construction
- Architect: Current structure by Jogbir Sthapit

Lazimpat Durbar, Aka Agni Bhawan is a palace complex in Kathmandu, the capital of the Nepal. Initially build and occupied by Kaji Bir Keshar Pande but later palace area was occupied by Bir Shumsher JBR, as prime minister the executive head of Nepal. The palace complex, located next to the historic Narayanhity Palace Museum, was incorporated impressive and vast array of courtyards, gardens and buildings.

== History ==
The palace complex lies in the heart of Kathmandu city, to the north of the Bagmati river. The history of the palace is closely linked with the history of Nepal and its rulers.

=== Under Rana ===
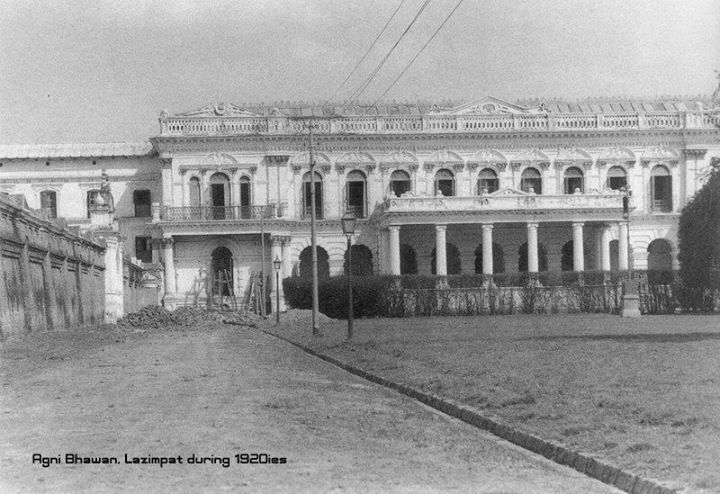
Lazimpat Durbar (then known as Agni Bhawan) after 1964

== Hotel Shanker ==
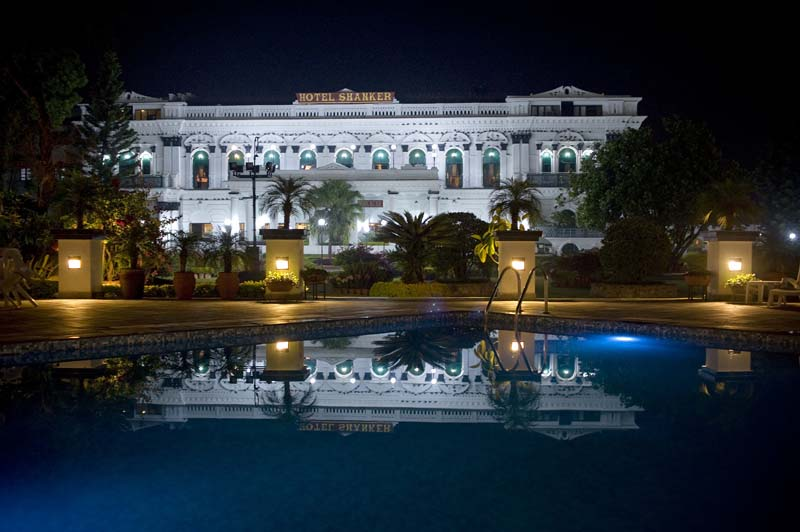
Modern day Hotel Shanker

After Agni Shumsher's death Lazimpat Durbar (then known as Agni Bhawan) was sold to Ram Shanker Shrestha who remodeled the interior into a historic luxury heritage hotel.

== See also ==
- Bir Shumsher JBR
- Hotel Shanker
- Rana palaces of Nepal
