= Bunkot =

Bungkot बुङकोट
- Village development committee
- Location in Nepal Bungkot (Nepal)
- Coordinates: 27.97°N 84.69°E
- Country: Nepal
- Zone: Gandaki Zone
- District: Gorkha District

Population (1991)
  - Total: 6,599
- Time zone: UTC+5:45 (Nepal Time)

Bungkot, formerly known as Bungkot VDC, currently falls under Shahid Lakhan (Lakhan Thapa Magar "First Martyr of Nepal") Rural Municipality ward 7 and ward 8 as Nepal entered in Federalism since 2015. Former Bungkot VDC that was structured with 9 wards as their administrative division is now merged to two wards of Shahid Lakhan Rural Municipality. Previous 1,2,3,4 wards of Bungkot VDC now falls in ward 7 of Shahid Lakhan Rural Municipality, whose administrative center is Khabdi-bhanjyang. Whereas, previous 5,6,7,8,9 wards now falls in ward 8 of the Rural Municipality, whose administrative center is Mailung.

Ward 7 and Ward 8 of Shahid Lakhan Rural Municipality is the most populated ward of the Rural Municipality. There is one hospital, 2 higher secondary school, 1 lower secondary, 6 primary level school and 1 privately owned boarding school in ward 7 and ward 8.

Mr. Sharan Shrestha and Mr. Kashi Nath Amgain is the Ward Chairperson of ward 7 and 8 respectively.

Bungkot is home to different caste, religion and ethnic community. Over 80% of the people are Hindus. The first martyr of Nepal Lakhan Thapa was born in Kahulebhangar, which lies in ward 7 of the Rural Municipality. Almost 80% of the people are literate and follow different occupations. A large number of youths are on Foreign Employment to Saudi Arabia, Malaysia, Dubai, Qatar, South Korea, while a significant number of youths are serving in Army and Police forces. While, farming is the national tradition of Nepali people.

== Geography ==
Bungkot lies in the lap of the Mahabharat range and follows a hilly terrain. The temperature is mild here. The extreme winter temperature is 0 degree Celsius, whereas it goes up to 37 degree Celsius in summer. One of the biggest rivers of Nepal, Budhi Gandaki flows through the eastern border with Dhading district.

The administrative center of Ward 7 (Khabdi-bhanjyang) is approximately 9 km far from the district headquarter. The road id basically earthen road with some gravel patch in some of the route. The Gandaki Provincial Government has allocated 30 Million Nepali rupees to upgrade the road to Bituminous Pavement surface and currently the construction work is going on from Dhungagadhe to Khabdibhanjyang.
