= Gagan Singh Bhandari =

Nepalese general

- गगनसिंह भण्डारी

Military commander
- Monarch: Rajendra Bikram Shah

Personal details
- Born: c. 1796 Gorkha Kingdom
- Died: 14 September 1846 Kathmandu, Nepal
- Known for: Leading general during the reign of King Rajendra; Close associate of Queen Rajya Lakshmi Devi; His assassination triggered the Kot massacre

Military service
- Allegiance: Kingdom of Nepal
- Branch/service: Nepalese Army
- Rank: General
- Battles/wars: Kot massacre

Gagan Singh Bhandari (Nepali: गगनसिंह भंडारी; c. 1796 – 14 September 1846) was a prominent Nepalese general during the mid-19th century. He was born into a Chhetri family from the Gorkha Kingdom. At the height of his influence, General Gagan Singh commanded seven regiments of the army, compared to three under the serving prime minister Fateh Jung Shah, making him one of the most powerful figures in the Nepalese court.

He was known for his political alliance with Queen Rajya Lakshmi Devi, the favored consort of King Rajendra Bikram Shah, who supported his authority and influence within the court. Some historians have alleged that he was romantically involved with the queen, a claim that has been subject to speculation but remains undocumented in primary sources.

Little is known about his early life. He was assassinated under mysterious circumstances while offering evening prayers at his private temple on the night of 14 September 1846. His death marked a major turning point in Nepalese history, eventually leading to the rise of Jung Bahadur Rana and the establishment of the autocratic Rana dynasty.

== Kot massacre ==
Following Gagan Singh's assassination, Queen Rajya Lakshmi Devi convened an emergency gathering of the nobility at the Kot courtyard in Hanuman Dhoka, Kathmandu. In a fit of rage, she demanded the culprit be punished and suspected Bir Keshar Pande of being behind the murder. She ordered Abhiman Singh Rana Magar, the then Commander-in-Chief of the Nepalese Army, to execute Pande on the spot. However, Abhiman Singh reportedly hesitated, having suspected Jung Bahadur Rana as the true culprit.

According to accounts, a violent confrontation ensued. Abhiman Singh was shot in the chest by an officer acting on Jung Bahadur's orders. Before dying, he is said to have shouted, "Junge was the killer of Gagan Singh" (गगन सिंहको हत्त्यारा जंगे नै हो).

The scene quickly descended into chaos. Jung Bahadur’s troops, already positioned strategically, suppressed the disorder, killing many of his rivals. The courtyard was left strewn with the bodies of high-ranking nobles, especially from the Thapa and Pande factions. This event, known as the Kot massacre, enabled Jung Bahadur to consolidate power and eliminate opposition, leading to the establishment of the Rana autocracy.

== Sources ==
- https://web.archive.org/web/20050308064007/http://www.dilliramanregmi.org/century/chapter2.html
- http://www.country-data.com/cgi-bin/query/r-9065.html
