= Pokhrel =

- Pronunciation: /ˈpoʊkrɛl/
- Language: Nepali, Kumaoni, Hindi

Origin
- Meaning: someone from Pokhara

Other names
- Variant forms: Pokhrel, Pokharel, Pokhariyal
- See also: Poudel, Bhattarai, Adhikari, Subedi

Pokhrel or Pokharel or Pokhariyal is a surname found among the Bahuns (Hill Brahmins) of Nepal in Pokhara and Indian Brahmins in Uttarakhand. It derives from the city of Pokhara in Nepal.

== Notable people ==
- Aananda Pokharel, Nepali politician
- Aastha Pokharel, Nepali model
- Bal Krishna Pokharel, Nepali writer and historian
- Bidhyanath Pokhrel, Nepali poet and politician
- Bina Pokharel, Nepali politician
- Cool Pokhrel, Nepali singer
- Dibesh Pokharel, Nepali singer, known by his stage name Arthur Gunn
- Giriraj Mani Pokharel, Nepali politician
- Ishwar Pokhrel, Nepali politician
- Kanhaya Lal Pokhriyal, Indian police official and mountaineer
- Khadga Bahadur Pokharel, Nepali politician
- Krishna Bhakta Pokhrel, Nepali politician
- Krishna Chandra Nepali Pokharel, Nepali politician
- Laxmi Prasad Pokhrel, Nepali politician
- Mariska Pokharel, Nepali actress
- Menuka Kumari Pokharel, Nepali politician
- Narayan Pokharel, Nepali Hindu preacher
- Pushpa Raj Pokharel, Nepali politician
- Ram Chandra Pokhrel, Nepali politician
- Ramesh Pokhriyal, Indian politician, former education minister
- Rishikesh Pokharel, Nepali politician
- Saigrace Pokharel, Nepali filmmaker
- Shankar Pokharel, Nepali politician
- Sugam Pokharel, Nepali singer
- Suman Pokhrel, Nepali poet and playwright
- Sunil Pokharel, Nepali theater director
- Trilochan Pokhrel, Indian independence activist
