= Vrajanath Poudyal =

Nepalese politician, royal priest and Tantrik (born c. 1753)

Pandit Vrajanath Poudyal (Nepali: व्रजनाथ पौड्याल) or Vrajanath Pandit (Nepali: व्रजनाथ पण्डित) was a Nepalese courtier, politician, minister and royal priest of the Shah dynasty. He played political rivalry against the traditional Gorkhali courtiers i.e. Tharghars as well as against the Prince Bahadur Shah of Nepal and Queen Rajendra Laxmi. His son Pandit Ranga Nath Poudyal became Mukhtiyar of Nepal.

== Life ==
=== Early life ===
Pandit Vrajanath Poudyal was born in 1810 B.S. (c. 1753 A.D.) The Dhaibung stone inscription of the Shaka year 1704 (1782/1783 A.D.) translated by Sanskrit poet Pandit Harinath Dhungel states that Vrajanath (referred as Vrajanath Sharma) was the son of father Jayamangala Pandit and mother Gauri. The inscription shows that Vrajanath was the eldest son among the five sons of Jayamangala. His other four brothers were - Raghunath, Jagannath, Lokanath and Hari(nath). His son was the well renowned Ranganath Pandit.

=== Political career ===
Pandit Vrajanath was a non-Gorkhali courtier in the Kingdom of Nepal. King Prithvi Narayan Shah appointed Pandit Vrajanath as personal tutor of Crown Prince Pratap Singh Shah in order to teach him polity, Shastras and other relevant studies. However, Vrajanath worked to please the Crown Prince and supported his Tantric practices. He worked with Karmacharyas of Kathmandu as the Guru in the Tantric practice of Pratap Singh. He further suggested the Crown Prince to worship Goddess Guhyeshwari to achieve success in the Tantric cult.

King Prithvi Narayan despised the Tantric practices of his eldest son and was irritated by the negative influences of Pandit Vrajanath and Sardar Swarup Singh Karki. He, therefore, referred Pandit Vrajanath and Sardar Swarup Singh in the quote: "the Kshetris and the Brahmins of the east and west should not be permitted in the royal court." The non-Gorkhali faction of Pandit Vrajanath, Sardar Swarup Singh and Maiju Rani was heavily disfavoured by the traditional courtiers called Tharghars. However, they remained the most powerful faction in the court due to strong affinity from the nearly similar aged King Pratap Singh.

When Pratap Singh Shah became the King of Nepal, the non-Gorkhali faction consisting Sardar Swarup Singh Karki, Pandit Vrajanath and Maiju Rani grew power and influence in the Shah court. After Swarup Singh confined Bahadur Shah of Nepal and Dal Mardan Shah by influencing King Pratap Singh, Pandit Vrajanath enjoyed the privileges of a Chautariya. This non-Gorkhali faction were successful in their intrigues. They did not wish Bahadur Shah to become a Chautariya after his release. They maintained conflict between King Pratap Singh and Prince Bahadur and Prince Bahadur was made a Amali (local administrator) of Dolakha. They curtailed the access of everyone to the King Pratap. When King Pratap Singh died on 6th Marga 1834 B.S. (1777 CE), he was active in the political intrigue to send the legitimate Queen Rajendra Laxmi to Sati. He wanted to rule in the name of the infant King Rana Bahadur Shah.

== Books ==
- Acharya, Baburam (2019). Acharya, Shrikrishna (ed.). Aba Yasto Kahilyai Nahos (in Nepali). Kathmandu: Fine Print Books. ISBN 978-9937-665-40-7.
- Acharya, Baburam (September 1, 1978), "King Prithvi Narayan Shah" (PDF), Regmi Research Series, 10 (9): 141–144, archived from the original (PDF) on August 7, 2024
- Vaidya, T.R.; Vajracharya, B.R. (1991). "The Role of Swarup Singh Karki During The Second Half of the 18th century Nepal" (PDF). Ancient Nepal. 121-122 December 1990 – March 1991. Department of Archaeology (Nepal). Archived from the original (PDF) on 14 February 2019.
