= Indraman Khatri =

Governor of Nepal

Sardar Indraman Khatri
- सरदार इन्द्रमान खत्री

Governor (Sardar) of Nepal
- Prime Minister: Damodar Pande

Personal details
- Died: 1804 AD Kathmandu

Military service
- Allegiance: Kingdom of Nepal

Indraman Khatri was a governor (or sardar) of the Kingdom of Nepal in the 19th century during the regency of Queen Rajendra Rajya Laxmi and Bahadur Shah.

== Later Life ==
As per the historical records, after the exiled king Rana Bahadur Shah returned to Kathmandu from Varanasi, India; he abandoned his saffron robes and attired in royal clothes, and then entered the royal palace. On the plan of Bhimsen Thapa (who would later become the prime minister) and others, Sardar Indraman Khatri was beheaded along with Prime Minister of Nepal Damodar Pande and other high officials in 1804.
