= Kingdom of Parbat =

Former kingdom located in present-day Nepal

Kingdom of Parbat पर्वत राज्य
- Demonym: Pahari or Parbatiya
- Government: Monarchy
- Historical era: Chaubisi Rajyas
Preceded by	Succeeded by
Takam Kingdom	Kingdom of Nepal
- Today part of: Nepal

The Kingdom of Parbat (Nepali: पर्वत राज्य) was a petty kingdom in the confederation of 24 states known as Chaubisi Rajya. Parbat was one of the powerful kingdoms in the 24 principalities.

== History ==
The Kingdom of Parbat was created in 1436 by King Dimba Bam of the Samalvanshi Thakurs, succeeding the Takam Kingdom. In 1786, Prince Bahadur Shah launched an invasion of the kingdom as a part of the campaign to unify the Nepalese principalities. Parbat was defeated and was under Nepalese control whilst retaining moderate autonomy. Parbat was a vassal state until 1961, when Mahendra of Nepal created the Rajya Rajouta Act which abolished the remaining Baisi and Chaubisi principalities that were under Nepalese vassalage.
