= Ranga Nath Poudyal =

Top administrator in Nepal

Shri Mukhtiyar Pandit Raj Ranga Nath Poudyal
- श्री मुख्तियार पण्डित राज रङ्गनाथ पौड्याल
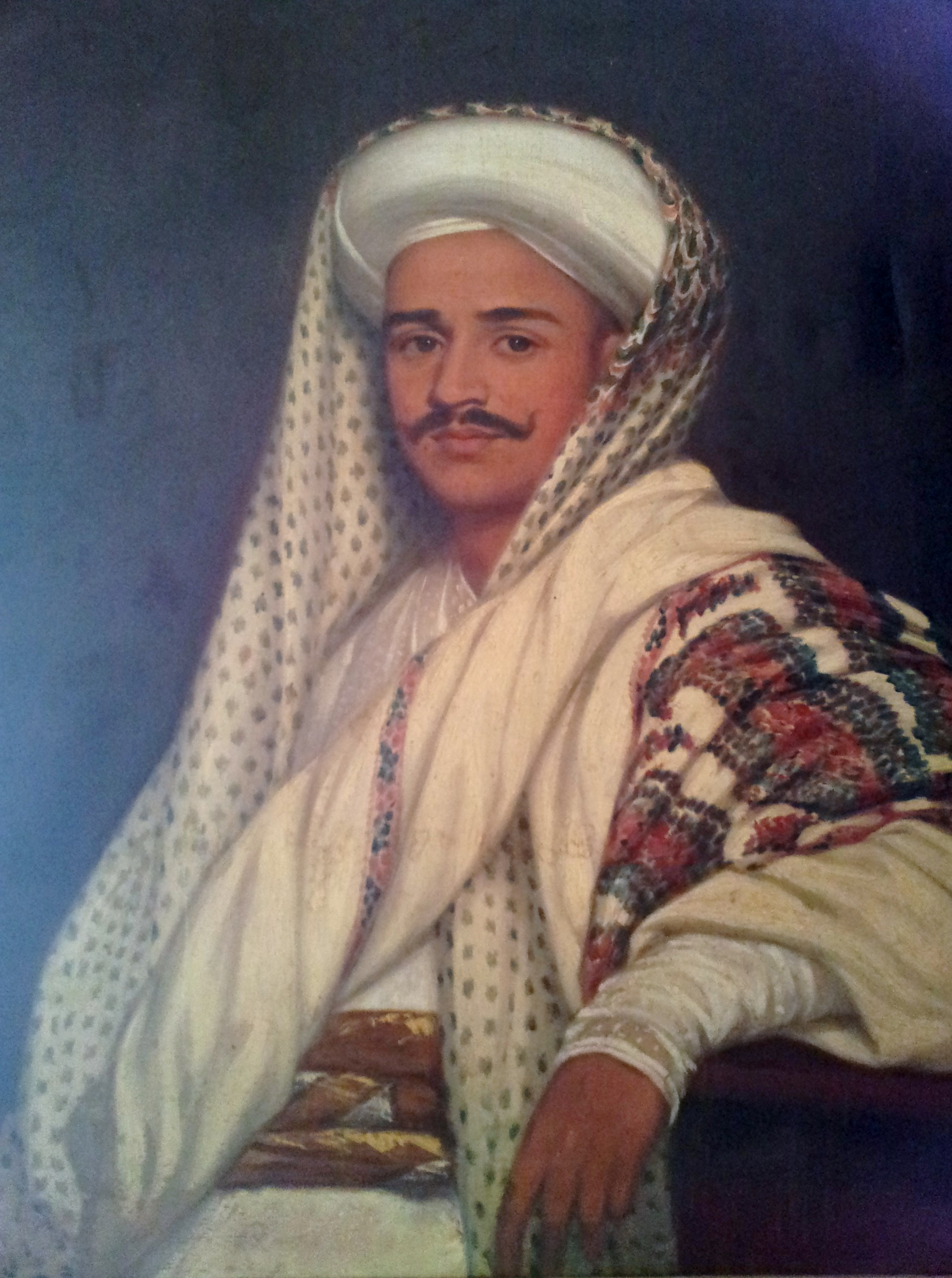
- Portrait of Ranga Nath Poudyal

Mukhtiyar of Nepal
- In office December 1837 – August 1838
- Preceded by: Rana Jang Pande
- Succeeded by: Puskhar Shah
- In office November 1840 – November 1840
- Preceded by: Rana Jang Pande
- Succeeded by: Fateh Jung Shah

Personal details
- Born: 1773 A.D. Makhan Tole, Kathmandu, Kingdom of Nepal
- Parent: Vrajanath Poudyal (father)
- Writing career
- Notable works: Rajbidhansaar & Kapurstwa

Ranga Nath Poudyal Atreya (Nepali: रङ्गनाथ पौड्याल आत्रेय) popularly known as Ranga Nath Pandit, was a Nepalese statesman who served as the Mukhtiyar (equivalent to Prime Minister) of Kingdom of Nepal from December 1837 to August 1838, and again in November 1840 for about 2–3 weeks. He was the first Brahmin Prime Minister of Nepal.

== Early life ==
Ranga Nath Poudyal was born in 1773 A.D. in Makhan Tole, Kathmandu to his father Vrajanath Poudyal, a prominent courtier in the palace who was later exiled to Varanasi. He belonged to Bahun community by ethnicity. Ranga Nath Poudyal spent his childhood years in Varanasi, where he attained mastery Sanskrit. In recognition of his scholarship, he was honored with the title "Pandit Raj" by the then king of Varanasi.

== Political career ==
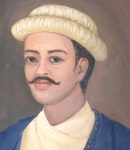
Ranga Nath Poudyal, an ally of Thapa dynasty

Ranga Nath Poudyal met Bhimsen Thapa in Varanasi. He was deeply influenced by Bhimsen Thapa and thus he forged his path to power by establishing himself as the prominent supporter of Bhimsen Thapa. After the execution of Mulkaji (Chief Kaji) Damodar Pande, Ranga Nath Poudyal was appointed as Raj Guru (Royal Preceptor) along with Ranajit Pande as appointed as Mulkaji, Bhimsen Thapa as second Kaji and Sher Bahadur Shah as Mul Chautariya. Ranga Nath Poudyal became the Prime Minister of Nepal at the time of utmost political turmoil. He is remembered as a clever man. Although he was the prominent supporter of Bhimsen Thapa. His political career was doomed after the downfall of Bhimsen Thapa. Ranga Nath Poudyal is often characterized as the spiritual advisor of the court rather than a powerful governor.

== Personal life ==
Ragna Nath Poudyal belonged to the Atreya clan. Not much is known about his personal life. He is believed by many to be spiritual minded.

== See also ==
- Brian Houghton Hodgson
- Bhimsen Thapa
- Rana Jang Pande
- Puskar Shah
- Vajanath Poudyal
- Paudel (surname)
