= Ram Chandra Pokhrel =

Ram Chandra Pokhrel (also Pokharel) (born January 1, 1945) is a politician and journalist in Nepal. He is affiliated with the Nepali Congress party. He is the eldest son of veteran freedom fighter Govardhan Sharma Pokhrel. Pokhrel is a current member of Constituent Assembly and Former Chief Party Secretary of Nepali Congress.

Pokhrel has been heavily involved in the democratic movement and arrested on many occasions. He served as the chairman of the District Development Committee (DDC), Tanahu district from 1992 to 1997. He was elected council member of Vyas municipality—9 Tanahu, Nepal in 1999. In 1968 he founded and served as the principal of the Nirmal high school in Damauli, Tanahun. Until recently, he served a member secretary of the Central Publicity Department in the Nepali Congress Party and member of Foreign Relation Committee. He is older brother of Dr. Jagadish Chandra Pokharel, former vice chairman of the national planning commission of Nepal. HMG NPC. He is also the founding general secretary of the federation of district development committees.

== Journalism career ==
From 1973 to 1980 he worked at a journalist for the national news agency in Nepal, the RSS. He interviewed several prominent individuals, among them Indian Prime Minister, Indira Gandhi in New Delhi (1980). Junko Tabei, the first woman to climb Mt. Everest and Nobel Peace Prize winner Mother Teresa in Kathmandu.

== Political arrests ==
=== Pre-1990 ===
Pokhrel was jailed for over three-and-a-half years by different regimes (total). His first jail time began, when he was barely 17 years old in 1960. King Mahendr'a regime put him behind bars for 18 months without any hearing, when Pokhrel protested again the dissolution of first democratically elected government of B.P. Koirala. Pokhrel has been arrested over 50 times in different occasions.

Pokhrel boycotting the elections to the Rastriya Panchyat 1981; Civil disobedience movement 1986; Led the Mass movement for democracy in Tanahun (1990).

=== After 2002 ===
During the peaceful mass movements led by seven party alliance against the regressive royal move of oct 4 2002, led the mass movement in the district of Tanahun, beaten, arrested and put into custody by the police during protest rallies against the royal government. Arrested while staging protest on April 9, 2006 during the last and decisive movement at Balaju the western part of metro Kathmandu and put into police detention camp at Maharajgunj. The administration issued an order for three months' detention to all 200 held there arrested at different parts of the capital city.

Ram Chandra Pokhrel is current Chief Party Secretary of Nepali Congress.

== District Development Committee ==
As the Chairman of the District Development Committee, he was involved in several major development projects in Tanahun after the restoration of democracy. Prominent among them, Literacy campaign raised literacy from 39% to 63% in the district in five years. Connected all village development committees by road. Increased grain production from 70,000 metric tons to more than 100,000 metric tons per year. Increased vegetable production from 3,000 metric tons to 18,000 metric tons per year attaining self-sufficiency. The district introduced off-season vegetables including cucumbers and cauliflower.

During his tenure, his district Tanahun was recognized as "model district".

== Publications ==
Pokhrel has published eight books, two in the process of publication and he has published over 200 articles. His publication primarily focuses on democratic values/social justice, democratic socialism and local development.

Political books:

- Democratic Socialism
- Biography of B. P. Koirala, 1983

Novels:

- Yo Juni ko Bhet, 1977
- Deep Rekha, 1983
- Ukali Ra Orali
- Das Limbuwan
- Magar Jati ko Aitihasik Parichaya
