= Damodar Pande =

Mul (Chief) Kazi of Nepal

Sri Sri Sri Mulkaji Saheb Damodar Pande
- श्री श्री श्री मूलकाजी साहेब दामोदर पाँडे
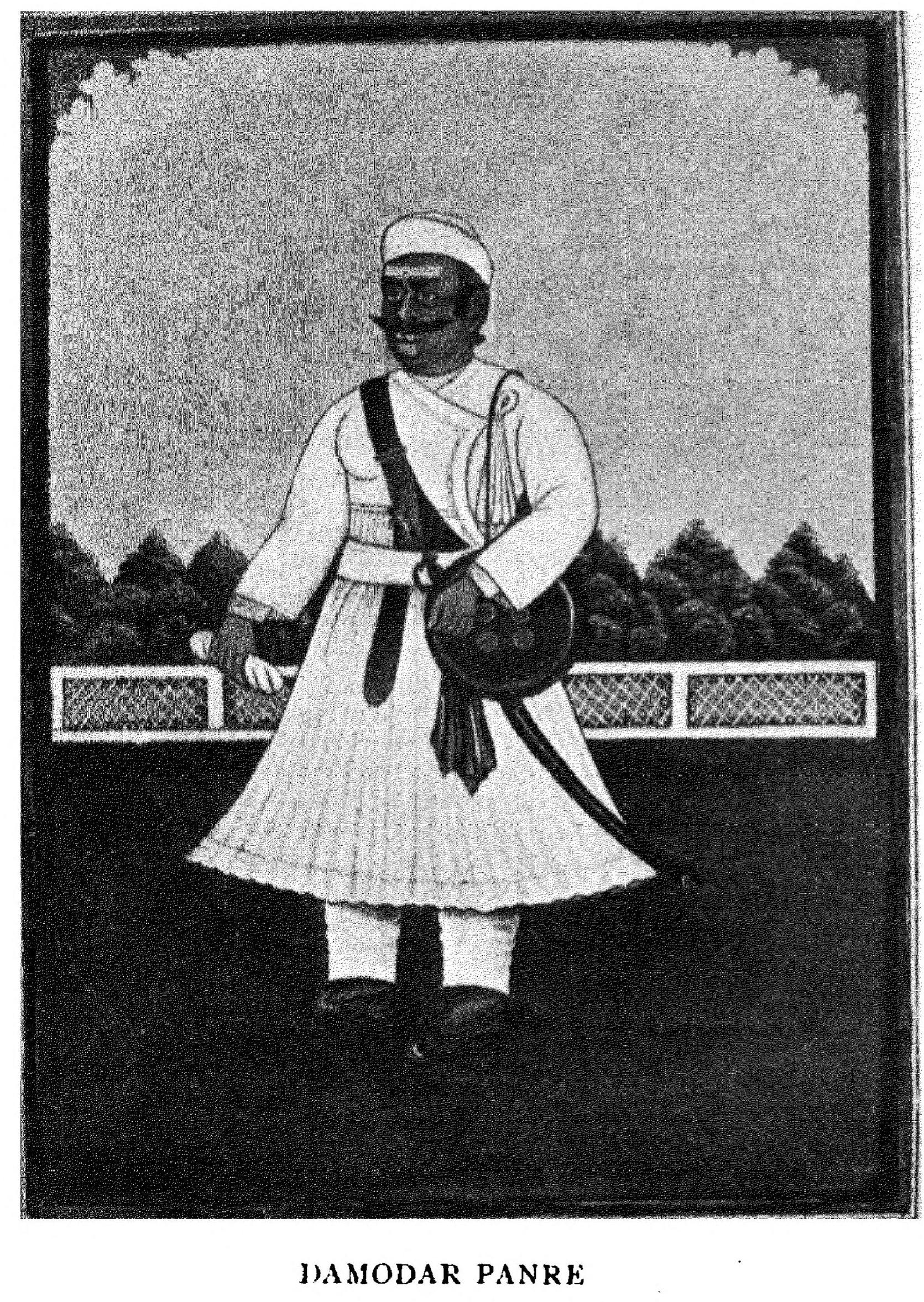

Mulkazi (Prime Minister) of Nepal

मूलकाजी साहेब
- In office February 1803 CE – March 1804 CE
- Monarch: Girvan Yuddha Bikram Shah
- Preceded by: Bakhtawar Singh Basnyat
- Succeeded by: Ranajit Pande

Commander-in-Chief of Nepal Army
- In office TBD – March 1804

Personal details
- Born: 1752
- Died: March 13, 1804 (aged 51–52) Bhadrakali, Kathmandu
- Children: 5 sons: Ranakeshar Pande, Ranabam Pande, Ranadal Pande, Rana Jang Pande, Karbir Pande
- Parent: Kalu Pande (father)

Military service
- Allegiance: Nepal
- Rank: General
- Battles/wars: Sino-Nepalese War (I&II)

Damodar Pande (Nepali: दामोदर पाँडे) (1752 – March 13, 1804) was the Mulkaji of Nepal (equivalent to Prime Minister of Nepal) from 1803 until March 1804 and the most influential Kaji from 1794 to his execution on March 13, 1804. He is also referred to as arguably the first Prime Minister of Nepal. He was the youngest son of Kalu Pande, the famous Kaji of Prithivi Narayan Shah. He was born in 1752 in Gorkha. Damodar Pande was one of the commanders during the Sino-Nepalese War and in Nepal-Tibet War. He was among the successful Gorkhali warriors sent towards the east by Prithivi Narayan Shah.

After his execution, Ranajit Pande (who was his paternal cousin) was established as Mulkaji (Chief Kaji), along with Bhimsen Thapa as second Kaji, Sher Bahadur Shah as Mul Chautariya and Ranga Nath Poudyal as Raj Guru (royal preceptor).

== Family ==
He was born on 1752 A.D. to Kaji of Gorkha, Kalu Pande. He belonged to a Hindu Chhetri family. His elder brother was Vamsharaj Pande, Dewan of Nepal. He had five sons among which Rana Jang Pande became Mukhtiyar of Nepal.

== Sino-Nepalese war ==
=== First Invasion ===
In the year 1788, Bahadur Shah sent Gorkha troops under the joint command of Damodar Pande and Bam Shah to attack Tibet. The Gorkha troops entered Tibet through Kuti (Nyalam Town) and reached as far as Tashilhunpo (about 410 km. from Kuti). A fierce battle was fought at Shikarjong in which the Tibetans were badly defeated. The Panchen Lama and Sakya Lama then requested the Gorkha troops to have peace talks. So the Gorkha troops left Shikarjong and went towards Kuti and Kerung (Gyirong).

When the Qianlong Emperor of China heard the news of the invasion of Tibet by Nepal, he sent a large troop of the Chinese army under the command of General Chanchu. Chancchu learned of the situation from the Tibetan Lamas. He decided to stay in Tibet till the dispute was settled.

The representatives of Tibet and Nepal met at Khiru in 1789 for peace talks. In the talks Tibet was held responsible for the quarrel and were required to give compensation to Nepal for the losses incurred in the war. Tibet had also to pay as tribute to Nepal a sum of Rs. 50,001 every year in return for giving back to Tibet all the territories acquired during the war. It was called the Treaty of Kerung. The Nepalese representatives were given Rs. 50,001 as the first installment. So giving back the territories - Kerung, Kuti, Longa, Jhunga and Falak went back to Nepal. But Tibet refused to pay the tributes after the first year of the conclusion of the treaty. As a result, the war between Nepal and Tibet continued.

=== Second Invasion ===
As Tibet had refused to pay the tribute to Nepal, Bahadur Shah sent an army under Abhiman Singh Basnet to Kerung and another army under the command of Damodar Pande to Kuti in 1791. Damodar Pande attacked Digarcha and captured the property of the monastery there. He also arrested the minister of Lhasa, Dhoren Kazi (Tib. Rdo ring Bstan 'dzin dpal 'byor, b.1760) and returned to Nepal. As soon as this news was heard by the Qianlong Emperor, he sent a strong troop of 70,000 soldiers under the leadership of Fuk'anggan to defend Tibet. Thus in 1792 the Nepal - Tibet war turned into a war between Nepal and the Qing empire.

The Qing Empire asked Nepal to return the property to Tibet which was looted at Digarcha. They also demanded them to give back Shamarpa Lama who had taken asylum in Nepal. But Nepal turned a deaf ear to these demands. The Qing imperial army responded to Nepal with military intervention. The Qing forces marched along the banks of the Trishuli River until they reached Nuwakot. The Nepalese troops attempted to defend against the Qing attack, but were already faced with overwhelming odds. Heavy damage was inflicted on both sides and the Chinese army pushed the Gurkhas back to the inner hills close to the Nepali capital. However, a comprehensive defeat of the Gorkhali army could not be achieved.

At the same time, Nepal was dealing with military confrontations along two other fronts. The nation of Sikkim had begun incursions along Nepal's eastern border. Along the far-western side, the war with Garhwal continued. Within Nepal's own borders, the kingdoms of Achham, Doti and Jumla openly revolted. Thus the problems that Bahadur Shah faced made it much harder to defend against the Qing army. The anxious Bahadur Shah asked for 10 howitzer mountain guns from the British East India Company. Captain William Kirkpatrick arrived in Kathmandu, but he put conditions of business treaty for delivery of the weapons. Wary of the British interest, weapons were not received and the war situation became critical for Bahadur Shah.

After a series of successful battles, the Qing army suffered a major setback when they tried to cross a monsoon-flooded Betrawati, close to a Gorkhali palace in Nuwakot. As the Qing troops had reached south of the Betravati river, near Nuwakot, it was difficult for the Nepalese troops to wait for them at Kathmandu. At Kathmandu, a Nepalese force of less than 200 soldiers attempted to resist the Qing troops at Betravati. On September 19, 1792, Nepalese troops launched a counterattack against the Qing forces encamped at Jitpurfedi. The Nepalese used a tactic where their soldiers carried lit torches in their hands, tying them to the branches of trees, and tying flaming torches on the horns of domestic animals and driving them towards the enemy. The Qing army suffered a defeat, but the loss failed to dislodge them from Nepal.

A stalemate ensued, and with their resources low and looming uncertainty regarding how long they would be able to hold on in addition to the need to continue their expansion drive on the western frontier, the Gorkhalis signed a treaty on the terms dictated by the Qing that required, among other obligations, Nepal to send tributes to the Qing emperor every five years.

=== Treaty of Betrawati ===
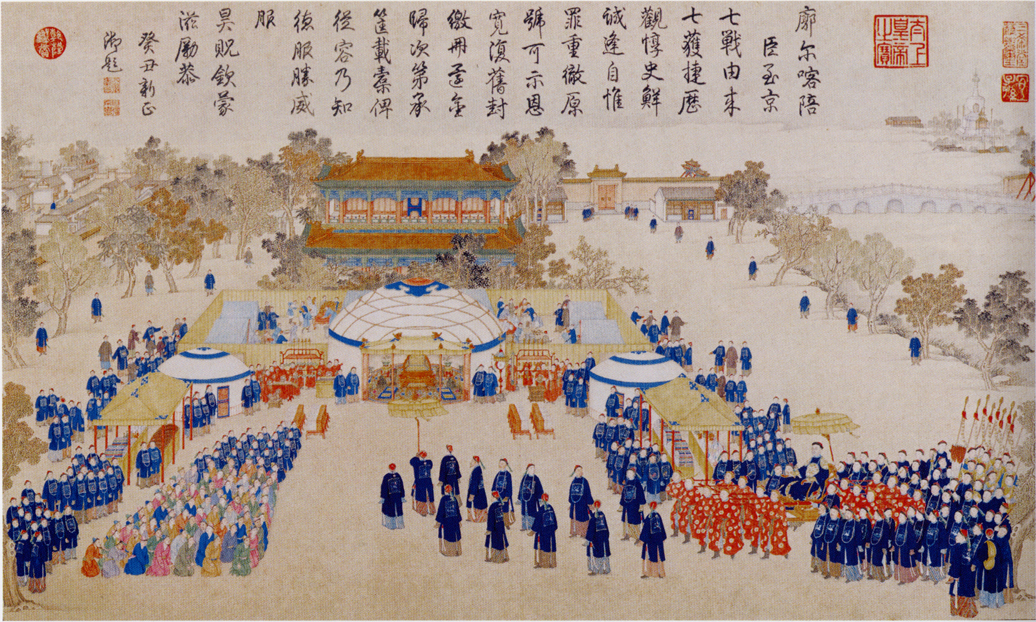
The celebration of consolidation of Tibet after the Gurkha Campaign (Nepal) 1792

On the 8th day of Bhadra, 10,000 Chinese troops advanced forward from Betrawati river. There were three forts passed the Betrawati river namely; Chokde, Dudethumko, and Gerkhu. At Gerkhu, the commanding officer was Kaji Kirtiman Singh Basnyat and at Chokde, the commanding officer was Kaji Damodar Pande. There were serious fightings around all the three forts and heavy repulse from Nepalese forces compelled Chinese troops to retreat to Betrawati river. At Betrawati bridge, the Chinese General Tung Thyang began to punish retreating Chinese soldiers with severe injuries resulting in their death. Two of the Chinese officers who retreated beyond the Betrawati river were punished with injury to their nose. The action of the Chinese General demotivated the troops and increase rapid desertion and retreat through other routes. Many Chinese troops died falling from hills into river and others from the bullets and arrows from Nepalese side. Around 1000 or 1200 Chinese troops were killed in the manner. The Chinese General Tung Thyang lost all hopes of attacking the Nepalese forces and decided to conclude a treaty with Nepal through his letter. The letter from Tung Thyang reached the government of Nepal. In reply, the government of Nepal issued a royal order deputing Kaji Damodar Pande to conclude a treaty with the Chinese Emperor to prevent further hostility and maintain peace with the Emperor. The royal order issued by King Rana Bahadur Shah to Kaji Damodar Pande on Thursday, Bhadra Sudi 13, 1849 (September 1792) is detailed below:

From King Ran Bahadur Shah,

To Damodar Pande.

Greetings. All is well here. We desire the same there. The news here is good. The Chinese Emperor is not insignificant. He is a great Emperor. We could have repulsed them with the blessing of (Goddess Shri Durga) when they came here this time. But it will not be good for the future to maintain hostility with the Emperor. He too desires to conclude a treaty, and that is what we too desire. Tung Thwang has sent a letter asking that one of the four Kajis be sent with letters and present to offer his respects to the Chinese Emperor. Kajis used to be sent formally to conclude treaties with Tanahu and Lamjung. We realize at present that it will not be proper for us not to depute a Kaji to the Emperor. When the matter was discussed with the other Kajis here, they said that Damdhar(Damodar) Pande, the recipient of Birta (land) grants and senior-most Kaji, should go. So you have to fo. If there is any delay, (the interests) of the State will be harmed. You should therefore depart from there. So far as instructions are concerned, you are a Pande of our court. You are not ignorant of (matters) which will benefit the State and bring you credit. You know (such matters). In this respect, act according to your discretion. Submit a reply to this soon, within 1 ghadi (24 minutes) after you receive this royal order. Delay will be harmful.

Dated Thursday, Bhadra Sudi 13, 1849 (September 1792) at Kantipur.

== Rise in power (1794–1804) ==
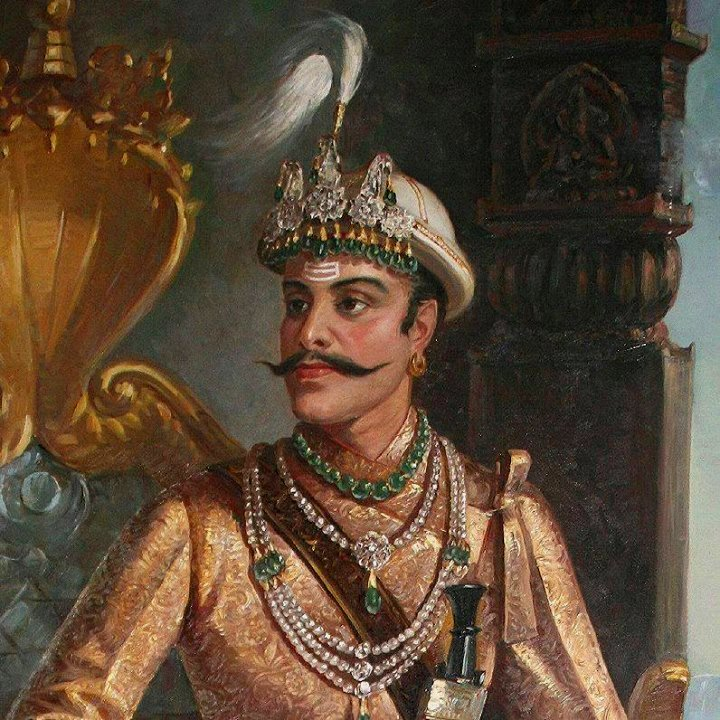
King Rana Bahadur Shah, the King of Nepal from 1777 to 1799.

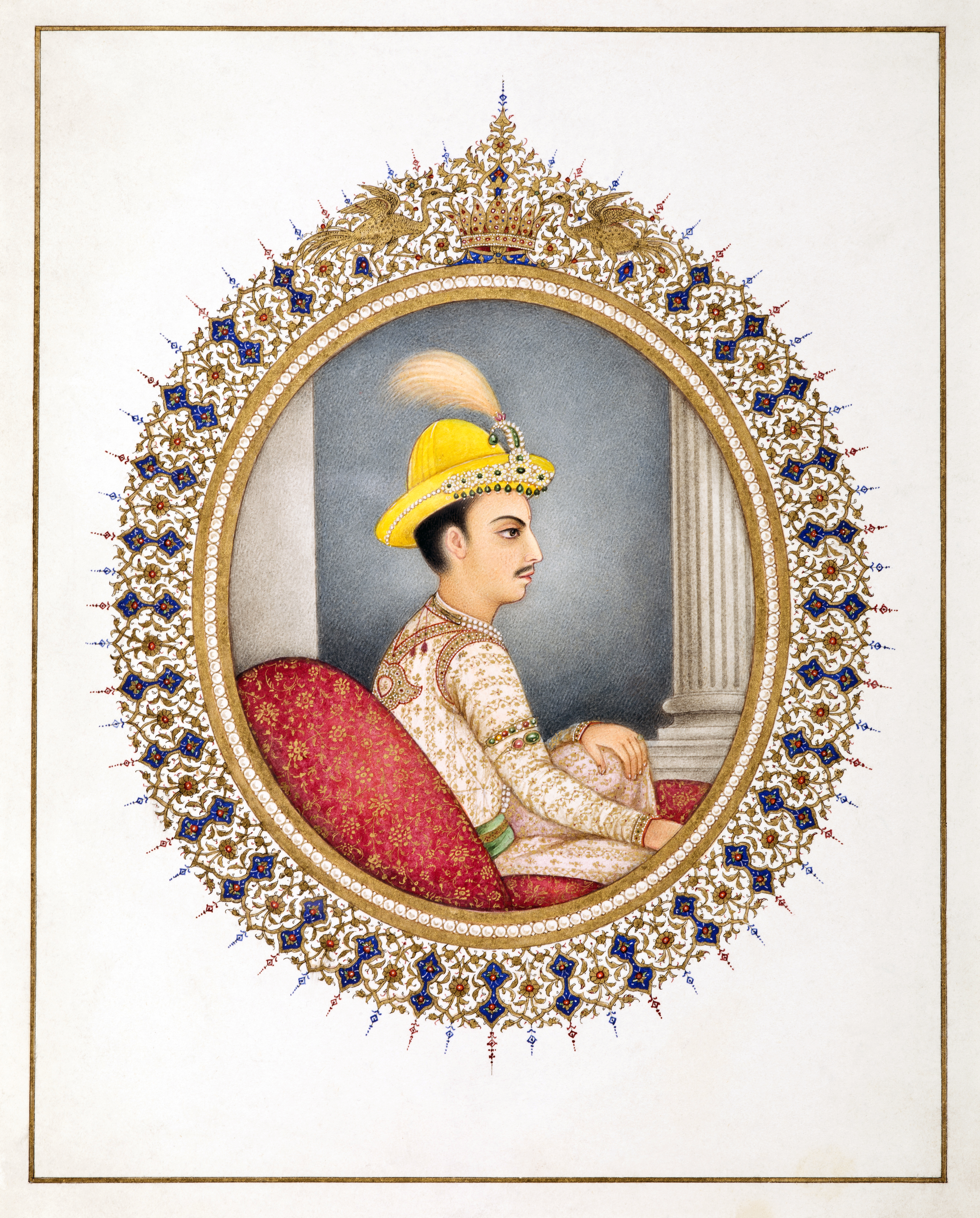
King Girvan Yuddha Bikram Shah (1797–1816)

In 1794, King Rana Bahadur Shah came of age, and his first act was to re-constitute the government such that his uncle, Chief Chautaria Bahadur Shah of Nepal, had no official part to play. Damodar Pande was the most influential Kaji among the four Kajis appointed after removal of Bahadur Shah of Nepal even though Chief (Mul) Kaji was Kirtiman Singh Basnyat. Rana Bahadur Shah was shocked and saddened by the death of his mistress in 1799. Owing to his irrational behavior, he was forced to resign by the citizens. He left the throne to his one and half year old son Girvan Yuddha Shah and fled to Banaras along with his followers like Bhimsen Thapa, Dalbhanjan Pande and his wife, the queen Raj Rajeshwari Devi.

=== Mulkaji(Prime Minister) of Nepal ===
During the minority of the King Girvan Yuddha Shah, Damodar Pande took over the administration as Mulkaji, or prime minister (1799-1804), with complete control over administration and the power to conduct foreign affairs. He set a significant precedent for later Nepalese history, which has seen a recurring struggle for effective power between king and prime minister. The main policy of Damodar Pande was to protect the young king by keeping his unpredictable father in Banaras and to play off against each other the schemes of the retired king's wives. By 1804 this policy had failed. The former king engineered his return and took over as mukhtiyar.

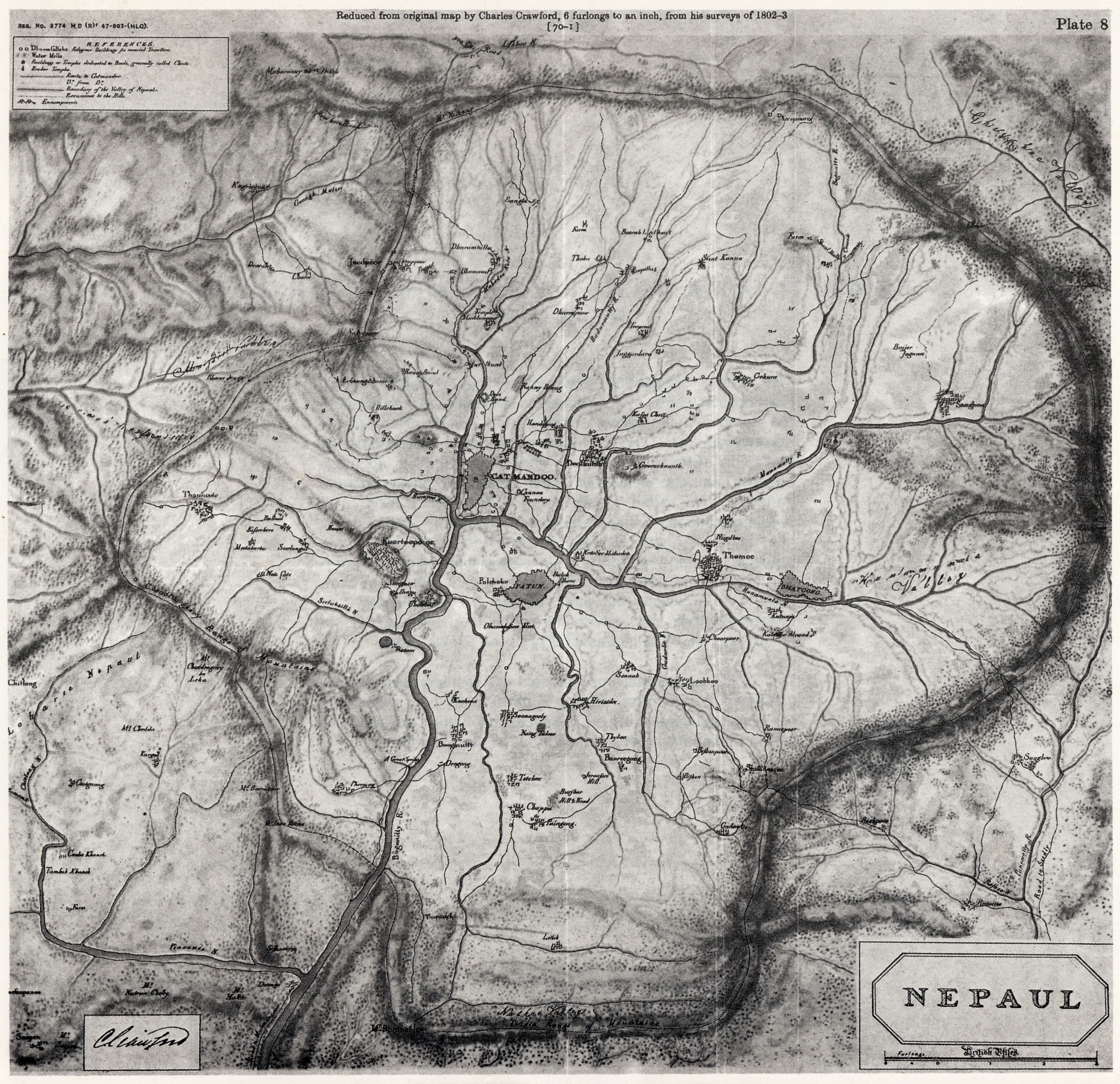
Map of Kathmandu Valley made by Charles Crawford (a member of Captain Knox's entourage) in 1802–03.

Damodar Pande always tried to protect king Girvan Yuddha Shah and keep Rana Bahadur off of Nepal. However, in 1804, March 4, the former king came back and took over the post of Mukhtiyar. Damodar Pande was then beheaded and killed in Thankot.

== Decline from power ==
Kirtiman Singh Basnyat was Mulkazi (Chief Kazi) and a favorite of the Regent Subarna Prabha Devi. He was secretly assassinated on 28 September 1801, by the supporters of Raj Rajeshwari Devi. (Note: Historian Rishikesh Shah (1990) also supports that Kirtiman Singh was killed on the year 1801 A.D. and was succeeded by his brother Bakhtawar Singh Basnyat.) Kazi Damodar Pande was accused of the murder charges. In the resulting confusion, many courtiers were jailed, while some executed, based solely on rumors. Bakhtawar Singh Basnyat, brother of assassinated Kirtiman Singh, was then given the post of Mul Kaji.

Almost eight months after the establishment of the Residency, Rajrajeshowri finally managed to assume the regency on 17 December 1802. After Rajrajeshowri took over the regency, she was pressured by Knox to pay the annual pension of 82,000 rupees to the ex-King as per the obligations of the treaty, which paid off the vast debt that Rana Bahadur Shah had accumulated in Varanasi due to his spendthrift habits. (Note: Rana Bahadur had borrowed a lot of money from many different people: Rs 60,000 from Dwarika Das; Rs 100,000 from Raja Shivalal Dube; Rs 1,400 from Ambasankar Bhattnagar. Similarly, he had borrowed a lot of money from the East India Company as well. However, Rana Bahadur was reckless in the manner he spent the borrowed money. For instance, he had once given an alms of Rs 500 to a Brahmin. For more details see) The Nepalese court also felt it prudent to keep Rana Bahadur in isolation in Nepal itself, rather than in the British controlled India, and that paying off Rana Bahadur's debts could facilitate his return at an opportune moment. Rajrajeshowri's presence in Kathmandu also stirred unrest among the courtiers that aligned themselves around her and Subarnaprabha. Sensing an imminent hostility, Knox aligned himself with Subarnaprabha and attempted to interfere with the internal politics of Nepal. Getting a wind of this matter, Rajrajeshowri dissolved the government and elected new ministers, with Damodar Pande as the Chief (Mul) Kaji in February 1803, while the Resident Knox, finding himself persona non grata and the objectives of his mission frustrated, voluntarily left Kathmandu to reside in Makwanpur citing a cholera epidemic. Subarnaprabha and the members of her faction were arrested.

Such open display of anti-British feelings and humiliation prompted the Governor General of the time Richard Wellesley to recall Knox to India and unilaterally suspend the diplomatic ties. The Treaty of 1801 was also unilaterally annulled by the British on 24 January 1804. The suspension of diplomatic ties also gave the Governor General a pretext to allow the ex-King Rana Bahadur to return to Nepal unconditionally.

=== Return of Rana Bahadur Shah ===
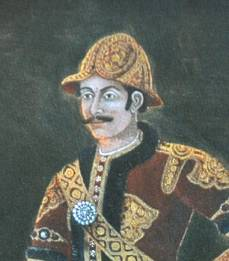
Portrait of Bhimsen Thapa in military uniform.

As soon as they received the news, Rana Bahadur and his group proceeded towards Kathmandu. Some troops were sent by Kathmandu Durbar to check their progress, but the troops changed their allegiance when they came face to face with the ex-King. Damodar Pande and his men were arrested at Thankot where they were waiting to greet the ex-King with state honors and take him into isolation. After Rana Bahadur's reinstatement to power, he started to exact vengeance on those who had tried to keep him in exile. He exiled Rajrajeshhwori to Helambu, where she became a Buddhist nun, on the charge of siding with Damodar Pande and colluding with the British. Damodar Pande, along with his two eldest sons, who were completely innocent, was executed on 13 March 1804; similarly some members of his faction, such as Sardar Indraman Khatri and others, were tortured and executed without any due trial, while many others managed to escape to India. (Note: Among those who managed to escape to India were Damodar Pande's sons Karbir Pande and Ranjang Pande.) Rana Bahadur also punished those who did not help him while in exile. Among them was Prithvi Pal Sen, the king of Palpa, who was tricked into imprisonment, while his kingdom forcefully annexed. Subarnaprabha and her supporters were released and given a general pardon. Those who had helped Rana Bahadur to return to Kathmandu were lavished with rank, land, and wealth. Bhimsen Thapa was made a second kaji; Ranjit Pande, who was the father-in-law of Bhimsen's brother, was made the Mul Kaji; Sher Bahadur Shah, Rana Bahadur's half-brother, was made the Mul Chautariya; while Rangnath Paudel was made the Rajguru (royal spiritual preceptor).

== Death ==
In 1804, March 1, the former king came back and took over the post of Mukhtiyar. March 13, Damodar Pande was then beheaded along with his two eldest son Ranakeshar and Gajkeshar, after he was imprisoned in Bhadrakali.
