= Narayan Pokharel =

Nepalese Hindu preacher (1958–2005)

Narayan Prasad Pokharel

Personal life
- Born: 1958 Baguwa, Gorkha District
- Died: 2005 (aged 46–47)
- Cause of death: Assassination by Maoist rebel

Religious life
- Religion: Hinduism

Narayan Prasad Pokharel (1958–2005) was president of the Nepal branch of the World Hindu Federation. He was killed by gunfire while attending a religious festival after being attacked by six gunmen who belonged to the Communist Party of Nepal (Maoist) led by Pushpa Kamal Dahal (Prachanda) during the country's civil war in Dudrakshya village, Rupandehi District, Nepal.

Maoist rebels perpetrated the killing. The killers descended on the festival in motorcycles at dawn and shot Pokharel nine times as he stood outside the guest house where he was staying.

The Maoists issued a statement condemning Pokharel for "indulging in sexual exploitation, amassing property illegally, misusing the name of Dalits and trying to garner popular support in favour of monarchy". The killing was reportedly carried out by the Dalit Mukti Morcha, an underground, banned organisation affiliated to the Maoists whose members were mostly Dalits, the Untouchables at the bottom of traditional Hindu caste-system. The Maoist rebels had been waging a violent campaign to topple the Hindu monarchy.

The conservative World Hindu Federation is headquartered in India and has branches in many countries throughout the world.

Narayan Pokharel was survived by his two wives and ten children.

Nepal's government in June 2009 announced it would honor him as a 'religious martyr'.
