= Karbir Pande =

Nepali Ruler

Kaji Karbir Pande
- श्री काजी करबिर पाँडे

Kaji (Nepal)
- In office TBD–TBD
- Preceded by: TBD
- Succeeded by: TBD

Personal details
- Died: 18 April 1843
- Parent: Mulkaji Damodar Pande (father)
- Relatives: Bamsa Raj Pande (uncle); Damodar Pande (father); Kalu Pande (grand father); Rana Jang Pande (brother)

Military service
- Allegiance: Kingdom of Nepal Nepal
- Branch/service: Nepal Army
- Rank: Kaji

Kaji Karbir Pande (Nepali: करबिर पाँडे) was one of the sons of Mulkaji Damodar Pande. After King Rana Bahadur's reinstatement to power, he ordered the execution of Damodar Pande, along with his two eldest sons, who were completely innocent, to be executed on 13 March 1804; similarly, some members of his faction were tortured and executed without any due trial, while many others managed to escape to India. Karbir Pande was among those who managed to escape to India along with his brother Rana Jang Pande and cousin Ranabam Pande.

== Career ==
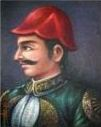
Rana Jang Pande, Karbir's brother

In January 1838, King Rajendra of Nepal promoted Rana Jang Pande to the post of Commander in the armed forces and his brother Karbir Pande as Kapardar ("Palace Chief Guard"). As a result, almost one hundred officers and soldiers resigned from the Singha Nath Battalion, openly calling themselves the private followers of Mathawar Singh, which showcased the popularity of Mathawar Singh in the military forces.

== Death ==
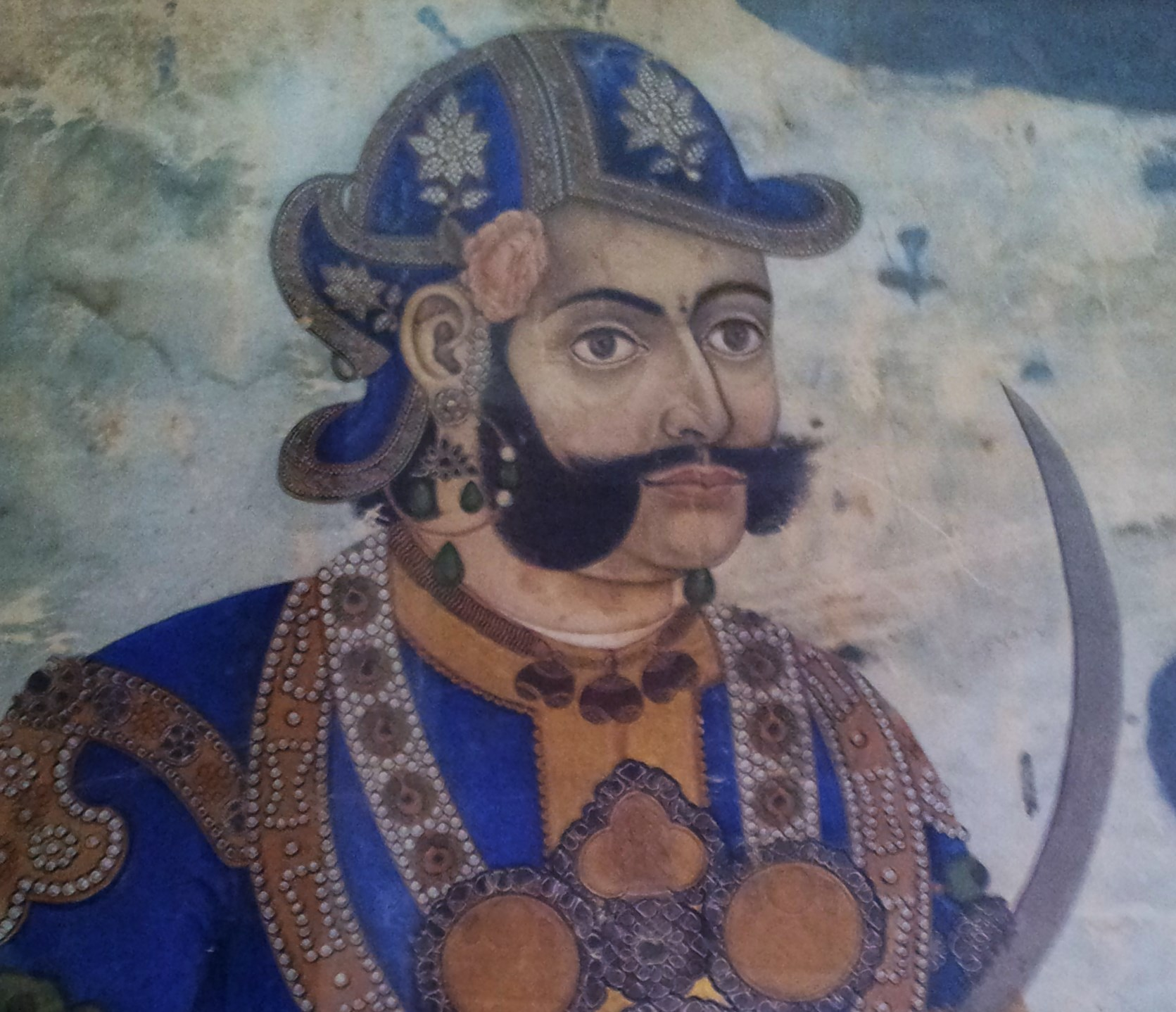
Portrait of Mathabar Singh Thapa in National Museum of Nepal, Chhauni

Mathabarsingh Thapa arrived in Kathmandu Valley on 17 April 1843, where a great welcome was organized for him. After Mathabarsingh Thapa secured his position in the palace, he successfully led to the murder of Karbir Pande along with all his political adversaries, namely, Kulraj Pande, Ranadal Pande, Indrabir Thapa, Ranabam Thapa, Kanak Singh Basnet, Gurulal Adhikari and many others, on several pretexts. Karbir Pande's ailing elder brother, Rana Jang Pande, was forced to see the murdered dead bodies of his brothers and nephews on April 18, 1843. Rana Jang, lying ill in his bed, was not given a death sentence. Rana Jang was shocked to death after seeing the dead bodies of his brothers and nephews on 18 April 1843.
