= Abhiman Singh Rana Magar =

19th-century Nepalese general and first victim of the 1846 Kot massacre

- अभिमान सिंह राना मगर
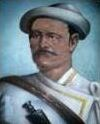
- Commander-in-Chief Abhiman Singh Rana Magar

Commander-in-Chief of the Nepalese Army
- Monarch: Rajendra Bikram Shah
- Prime Minister: Fateh Jung Shah

Personal details
- Died: 15 September 1846 Kathmandu, Nepal
- Known for: First victim of the Kot massacre; high-ranking Magar military officer; symbol of the Magar political legacy

Military service
- Allegiance: Kingdom of Nepal
- Branch/service: Nepalese Army
- Rank: General
- Battles/wars: Kot massacre

Commander-in-Chief Abhiman Singh Rana Magar (Nepali: अभिमान सिंह राना मगर) was a Nepalese army general and minister who served under King Rajendra Bikram Shah until his death on 15 September 1846. He is known as the first victim of the Kot massacre, a pivotal event in Nepalese history. According to a government letter sent to the British Resident, Major Lawrence, in Kathmandu, the massacre resulted in the deaths of 32 nobles (Bhardars), paving the way for Jung Bahadur Rana to consolidate power and eventually establish the Rana dynasty.

Historians offer differing interpretations of Abhiman Singh's political role. Some accounts suggest that he was reluctant to pursue the position of Prime Minister, while others assert that the queen had supported his potential appointment.

== Birth, childhood and education ==
No records so far are available as to who his parents were, birthplace, childhood and education also. But it can be fairly said that he was a 'literate person' because his signatures can be found in the government papers jointly signed together with then Prime Ministers Bhimsen Thapa and Mathabarsingh Thapa also.

== Prime Ministerial contender ==
The British Resident to Nepal Major Lawrence's letter, paragraph four, of August 26, 1845, to British Government clearly states that General Abhiman Singh Rana Magar was also a prime ministerial contender as the seat had fallen vacant since sometime already. But he seemed to be 'declining the dangerous office'. (Stiller 1981:285).

In another letter to his government on September 23, 1845, Resident Lawrence wrote, a council of minister was formed consisting of "Chautaria Fatteh Jung and Kazis Gagan Singh, Abhiman Rana and Dalbhanjan Pandey" . Minister Abhiman Singh Rana Magar, retaining his job in the army as general, had two regiments under him. He was Mulki Dewan, which would mean a minister responsible for home affairs: managing internal affairs east of Palpa.

== The Kot Massacre, September 15, 1846 ==
General Gagan Singh Bhandari was mysteriously killed while he was worshipping some deity at his residence on September 14, 1846. The Queen Laxmi Devi ordered all Bhardars to report themselves to the Kot, at present day Hanuman Dhoka in Kathmandu. The furious Queen, as a wounded lioness, ordered out loud to bring in front of her and punish whoever might have killed General Gagan Singh. Jung Bahadur's gesture toward Kaji Bir Keshar Pande (a rival of Kazi Gagan Singh Bhandari) prompted the dangerously enraged Queen to order Abhiman Singh Rana to sever the former's head. The reason probably because, he was then interior minister - 'Mulki Dewan' of the country. But Abhiman Singh Rana Magar begged King's approval to execute the job. A heated debate followed and the situation turned so tense and dangerous, Abhiman Singh Rana Magar wanted to dash out. A sepoy at the gate blocked and bayoneted at his chest. The dying Abhiman Singh Rana Magar wrote a letter in Nepali 'Ja' on the Kot wall with the blood gushing out of his chest suggestive of Jung Bahadur Rana being the culprit. In the government letter to the British resident in Kathmandu 32 Bhardars are listed as killed but the number should have been far more than stated.
