= Chautariya Pushkar Shah =

Nepalese politician and diplomat (1784–1841)

Pushkar Shah
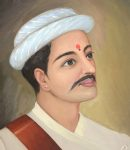
- General Sri Sri Sri Chautariya Pushkar Shah

Mukhtiyar of Nepal
- In office 1838–1839
- Preceded by: Ranganath Paudel
- Succeeded by: Rana Jang Pandey

Personal details
- Born: Pushkar Shah; August 16, 1784 Kathmandu, Nepal
- Died: 1841 (aged 56–57)

Mukhtiyar General Sri Sri Sri Chautariya Pushkar Shah (16 August 1784 – 1841) was a prominent Nepalese statesman, diplomat, and military leader. He served as Mukhtiyar (prime minister) of Nepal from August 1838 to early 1839. He is notable for his diplomatic missions to China and for attempting to establish strategic alliances with regional powers to protect Nepal’s sovereignty during the early 19th century.

== Early life ==
Pushkar Shah was born on 16 August 1784 in Kathmandu, into a collateral branch of the Shah dynasty. He received private education in administration, military strategy, and diplomacy, preparing him for high office. His family connections allowed him access to influential positions within the royal court.

== Governor of Doti ==
From 1831 to 1837, Pushkar Shah served as the governor of Doti, a strategically significant western region. In this role, he reinforced Nepalese administrative control, managed local disputes, and maintained vigilance against potential incursions from neighboring territories. He also began developing his reputation as a capable diplomat and statesman.

== Diplomatic Mission to China ==
In 1837, Pushkar Shah led the tenth quinquennial Nepalese mission to China under the Qing Emperor Daoguang. The mission aimed to reaffirm Nepal-China diplomatic ties, negotiate trade matters, and explore support against British colonial expansion in South Asia.

=== Delegation ===
The diplomatic delegation included:

- Captain Kirti Dhoj Pande (deputy leader)
- Rana Bikram Shah
- Khardar Purna Nanda
- Vansaraj Thapa (interpreter)
- Mahiman Karki, Amrit Mahat, Dal Bir Khatri
- Gajadhar Padhya, Bhau Singh, Yaktabar (Shaktabar) Jaisi
- Mammu Miya, Bhariya Nayak Padma Narayan, Gotha Rana, Dambar Thapa

=== Journey and Observances ===
The mission departed Kathmandu on 14 July 1837. Pushkar Shah strictly observed Hindu religious practices throughout the journey, consuming only food prepared by his own cooks and refusing tea offered by others. Upon arrival in Peking (Beijing), the delegation received a formal audience with the Daoguang Emperor, marking a successful diplomatic engagement.

=== Political Context ===
The mission coincided with political unrest in Nepal, including the dismissal and imprisonment of long-serving Prime Minister Bhimsen Thapa. Pushkar Shah navigated these internal challenges carefully while maintaining the mission's objectives. The delegation returned to Kathmandu on 25 September 1838 with the Chinese Emperor’s parwana, after a journey of nearly 14 months.

== Secret Strategic Alliance Efforts ==
=== Alliance with Ranjit Singh of Punjab ===
While Governor of Doti, Pushkar Shah attempted to explore a secret alliance between Nepal and Ranjit Singh of the Punjab region against the British East India Company. This reflects Nepal’s strategy to safeguard sovereignty by building regional partnerships.

=== Alliance with Qing China ===
Pushkar Shah’s mission to China was also motivated by strategic concerns. Nepal sought military and financial support from the Qing court to counterbalance British influence. Despite detailed petitions, the Qing Emperor did not provide troops or subsidies, requesting Nepal to maintain peace with the British.

== Mukhtiyar of Nepal ==
Pushkar Shah was appointed Mukhtiyar in 1838. Although his tenure lasted less than a year, he had a significant influence on high-level policy and foreign diplomacy, contributing to the maintenance of Nepalese political stability during a turbulent period. His appointment reflected the king’s trust in his integrity and diplomatic skill. Due to his strong anti-British stance and readiness to consider military action, his position alarmed the British authorities, who formally requested his removal. Initially, the king resisted these demands, but eventually he acquiesced in order to preserve domestic tranquility and avoid escalating tensions with the British Empire.

== Legacy ==
Pushkar Shah is remembered as a distinguished diplomat, military leader, and statesman who played a pivotal role during a critical period in the history of the Gorkhali nation. His notable contributions include:

- Leading a landmark diplomatic mission to China, which strengthened Nepal's relations with the Qing Empire and enhanced its international standing.
- Pursuing strategic regional alliances to safeguard the sovereignty and territorial integrity of the Gorkhali nation.
- Serving with distinction during a politically turbulent era, navigating complex internal and external challenges.
- Upholding and advancing the administrative and military traditions of the Shah dynasty, ensuring continuity of governance and statecraft.

== Death ==
Pushkar Shah died in 1841, remembered as a diplomat, military strategist, and statesman whose leadership helped the Gorkhali nation manage both domestic instability and the pressures of regional geopolitics during a pivotal period in its history.
