= Kot massacre =

1846 killing of Nepalese government officials and royals

Kot Massacre
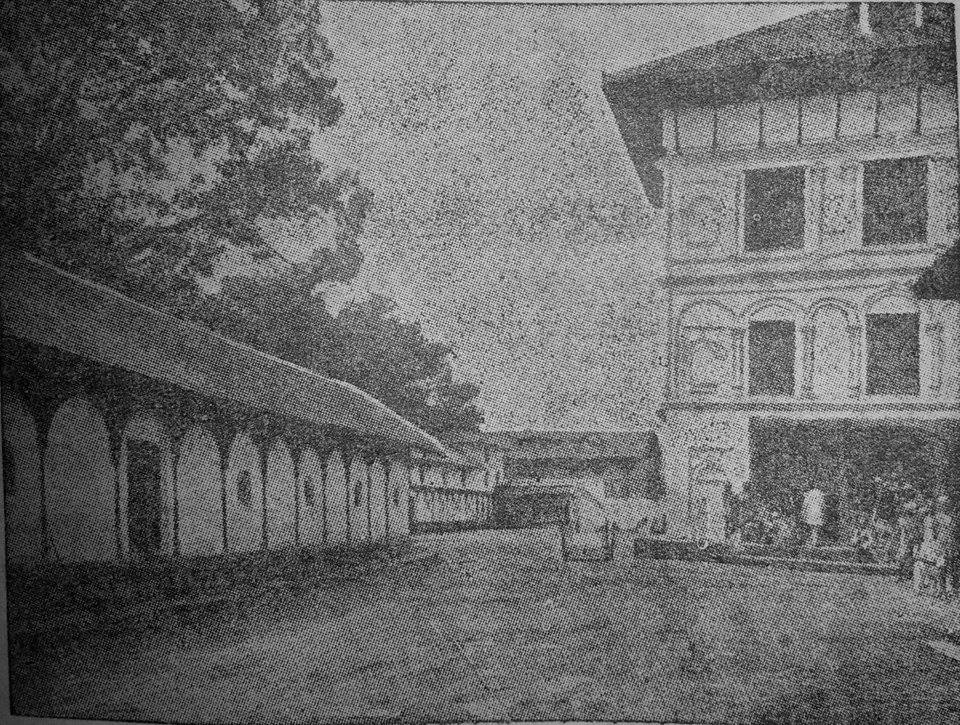
- Kot arsenal at Basantapur Durbar, Kathmandu
- Location: Basantapur Durbar, Kathmandu
- Date: 14 September 1846; 180 years ago night (Nepal Standard Time)
- Attack type: political assassination (open court massacre)
- Weapons: Talwar, rifle, Khukuri
- Deaths: 30-40 civil, military officers and palace guards (including then Prime Minister of Nepal Fateh Jung Shah; Kaji Dalbhanjan Pande; Kaji Abhiman Singh Rana Magar; Kaji Bir Keshar Pande)
- Perpetrators: Jung brothers: (Jung Bahadur Rana, Bam Bahadur Kunwar, Bhaktabir Kunwar, Badri Narsingh Kunwar, Jaya Bahadur Kunwar, Krishna Bahadur Kunwar, Ranodip Singh Kunwar, Jagat Shamsher Kunwar, Dhir Shamsher Kunwar); Jung supporters:Rana Mehar Adhikari, Bhotu Ghale

The Kot massacre (Nepali: कोत पर्व) took place on 14 September 1846 when then Kaji Jung Bahadur Kunwar and his brothers killed about 30-40 civil officials, military officers and palace guards of the Nepalese palace court including the Prime Minister of Nepal and a relative of the King, Chautariya Fateh Jung Shah along with other senior-most ministers and army generals at the palace armory (Kot) of Hanuman Dhoka in Kathmandu.

The Kot meeting was called upon by Queen Rajya Laxmi Devi after the same night murder of her confidante Kaji Gagan Singh Bhandari while performing worship at his prayer room. The Kot meeting turned ugly and eventually, the Jung brothers and their supporters led an open court full-fledged assault on all rival participants in the meeting. This massacre led to the loss of power of political clans such as Chautariyas, Pandes, Thapas, and Basnyats and that of King Rajendra Bikram Shah and Queen Rajya Laxmi Devi and ultimately the establishment of the Rana autocracy in Nepal.

== Background ==
At the peak of instability in Nepalese politics, a coalition ministry was formed in September 1845, headed by Fateh Jung Chautaria, but the real power behind the throne was General Gagan Singh Bhandari, (Note: He is also referred to as Gagan Singh Bhandari in certain texts.) who controlled seven regiments in the army compared to the three under the prime minister. Abhiman Singh Rana Magar and Jung Bahadur Kunwar also served as commanders, each with three regiments. It is occasionally alleged that general Gagan Singh Khawas also had an illicit relationship with Queen Rajya Laxmi Devi. Since the king was mentally unfit to rule, it was the queen who handled affairs of state on his behalf, and in this capacity, it was necessary for her to converse occasionally with the general.

Gagan Singh Bhandari was found dead on the balcony of his palace during the night of 16 September 1846. The queen commanded Bahadur, who happened to be ready with his regiments, to assemble the entire administrative establishment of the country immediately at the courtyard of the palace armoury. Following the queen's orders, Jung Bahadur ordered his men to let people inside the Kot but not to let them out without Queen's or his own orders.

== Overview ==
Following the Queen's order, courtiers hurried to the Kot as soon as they heard the royal summons. Many of the courtiers were unarmed except for a sword, as they had responded immediately to the royal summons. The troops allocated by Jung Bahadur Rana also had taken most of the arms of courtiers who had managed to bring them. Queen Laxmi Devi and King Rajendra Bikram Shah were also present in Kot.

At almost midnight, most of the courtiers were present at Kot. Everyone there was full of fears and skeptical thoughts. General Abhiman Singh Rana Magar spoke to the King about the possibility of a massacre. His presence had relieved some of the members present. Abhiman Singh also fetched three troops under his control to Kot.

Prime Minister Chautariya Fateh Jung Shah had still not arrived. Jung Bahadur Rana called his younger brother Bam Bahadur Kunwar Rana to fetch Fateh Jung. Emotions ran high among the assembled bands of nobles and their followers, who listened to the Queen give an emotional harangue blaming the Pandes and demanding that Abhiman Singh Rana Magar execute Kaji Bir Keshar Pande, whom she suspected for the death of Gagan Singh. Abhiman Singh Rana Magar hesitated and looked to the King. The King hesitated and said to punish the guilty only after a proper investigation of the matter. He pointed out that he must have a discussion with Prime Minister regarding this matter and left. He then left Hanuman Dhoka palace and went to the British residency. When he was denied an audience with the Resident at such a late hour, he went to Narayanhiti Palace. In Narayanhiti, King Rajendra had some time alone with the Prime Minister. Either King Rajendra had not wanted to give information about the conditions at Kot or Fateh Jung had not understood the point. In either case, Fateh Jung went to Kot with minimal security.

Meanwhile, at Kot, surrounded by Jung Bahadur's regiments, tension grew high as most of the nobles and Prime Minister Fateh Jung Shah gathered there. Seeing a high possibility of bloodshed, Jung Bahadur, Fateh Jung and Abhiman Singh Rana Magar decided that Jung Bahadur and Fateh Jung should try to calm the Queen, and Abhiman Singh Rana Magar, who had disobeyed the Queen's orders, would stay behind. As the two went to find the Queen, Abhiman Singh Rana Magar decided to move his own regiments to Kot, but he was prevented from leaving. Abhiman Singh Rana Magar tried to force his way out, and was killed in the process. After panic ensued, the bloodshed began. Many Thapas, Pandes and Basnyats died, including Fateh Jung, Khadga Bikram Shah and Dalbhanjan Pande. Some escaped by climbing over walls and roofs and even through the drainage systems. Jung Bahadur Rana easily used the situation to eliminate his rivals.

== Aftermath ==
Jung Bahadur Rana was made Prime Minister by the queen immediately after the massacre. Feeling he presented a threat to her power, the Queen conspired to eliminate Jung Bahadur and elevate her son to the throne. The Basnyat Conspiracy—so called because many of its participants belonged to one of the last leading noble families, the Basnyat—was betrayed and its ringleaders were rounded up and executed at Bhandarkhal massacre. A meeting of leading notables, packed with Rana supporters, found the Queen guilty of complicity in the plot, stripped her of her powers, and sent her into exile at Varanasi, along with King Rajendra Shah. The King began plotting his return from India. In 1847, Jung Bahadur Rana informed the troops of the exiled King's activities, announced his dethronement, and elevated Rajendra's son to the throne as Surendra Bikram Shah. King Rajendra Bikram Shah was captured later that year in the Terai and brought back as a prisoner to Bhadgaon, where he spent the rest of his life under house arrest. Jung Bahadur Rana then established the Rana dynasty, which ruled Nepal for more than a century.

== See also ==
- List of massacres in Nepal
