= Fateh Jung Shah =

6th Prime Minister of Nepal (1805–1846)

Shri Chautariya Mukhtiyar Saheb Fateh Jung Shah
- फत्तेजङ्ग शाह
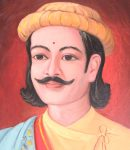
- Portrait of Fateh Jung Shah

Prime Minister of Nepal
- In office 19 September 1845 – 14 September 1846
- Monarch: Rajendra Bikram Shah
- Preceded by: Mathabar Singh Thapa
- Succeeded by: Jung Bahadur Rana

Mukhtiyar of Nepal
- In office 1 November 1840 – 2 January 1843
- Monarch: Rajendra Bikram Shah
- Preceded by: Rana Jang Pande
- Succeeded by: Mathabar Singh Thapa

Personal details
- Born: 1805 A.D. Gorkha, Nepal
- Died: 14 September 1846 (aged 40–41) Kathmandu, Nepal
- Cause of death: Kot Massacre
- Children: 3 sons, Khadga Bikram Shah; Guru Prasad Shah; Guna Bahadur Shah
- Parents: Prana Shah (father); Moha Kumari Devi (mother)
- Relatives: Chautariya family
- Education: Private tutoring
- Nickname: Fateh Jung Chautariya

Fateh Jung Shah, (Note: Nepali: फत्तेजङ्ग शाह) was a Nepalese statesman and administrator, who served as the Mukhtiyar of Kingdom of Nepal from 1 November 1840 to 25 December 1843. (Note: Mukhtiyar is translated as Chief Authority and was roughly equivalent to a Prime Minister or Head of Government.) He later served as the Prime Minister of Kingdom of Nepal from 19 September 1845 until his assisination on 14 September 1846, after the office of Prime Minister was established by Mathabar Singh Thapa on 1 January 1845, replacing the earlier Mukhtiyar system. He belonged to the royal lineage of the Chautariya family. He was killed during the Kot Massacre of 1846.

== Early life and background ==
Fateh Jung Shah was born on 1805 A.D. as eldest son of Sri Chautaria Prana Shah and Chautaryani Moha Kumari Devi. He was 6th generation of King Prithvi Narayan Shah of Gorkha. He was nephew of PM Chautariya Pushkar Shah. His 4 brothers were Colonel Sri Chautaria Guru Prasad Shah, Rajguru Ram Krishna Bahadur Shah, Captain Sardar Bir Bahadur Shah and Colonel Sri Chautaria Rana Sher Shah. His sister was Hiranya Garbha Devi, third wife of PM Jung Bahadur Rana. He was educated privately.

== Works ==
He was appointed Mukhtiyar (1840–1843). He lived in exile at Gaya, India from 1843 to 1845. Later, he was promoted to Full General and Commander of Three Regiments in 1845 after the exile. He then served as Mukhtiyar and Minister of Foreign Affairs (1845–1846).

== Children ==
He had three sons including Sri Chautaria Khadga Bikram Shah (Khadga Babusaheb) who was killed with him at the September 1846 Kot Massacre. The other two were Guru Prasad Shah and Guna Bahadur Shah.

== Siblings ==
His 4 brothers were Colonel Sri Chautaria Guru Prasad Shah, Rajguru Ram Krishna Bahadur Shah, Captain Sardar Bir Bahadur Shah and Colonel Sri Chautaria Rana Sher Shah. His sister was Hiranya Garbha Devi.

== Death ==
He was killed in Kot Massacre at the courtyard of Hanuman Dhoka Palace on 14 September 1846.

== See also ==
- Kingdom of Grokha
- Kot massacre
- List of Nepali political clans
- List of prime ministers of Nepal
- List of Chief of the Nepali Army
- Timeline of Nepalese history
