= Mukhtiyar =

Highest executive office in the Kingdom of Nepal (1804–1845)

- मुख्तियार
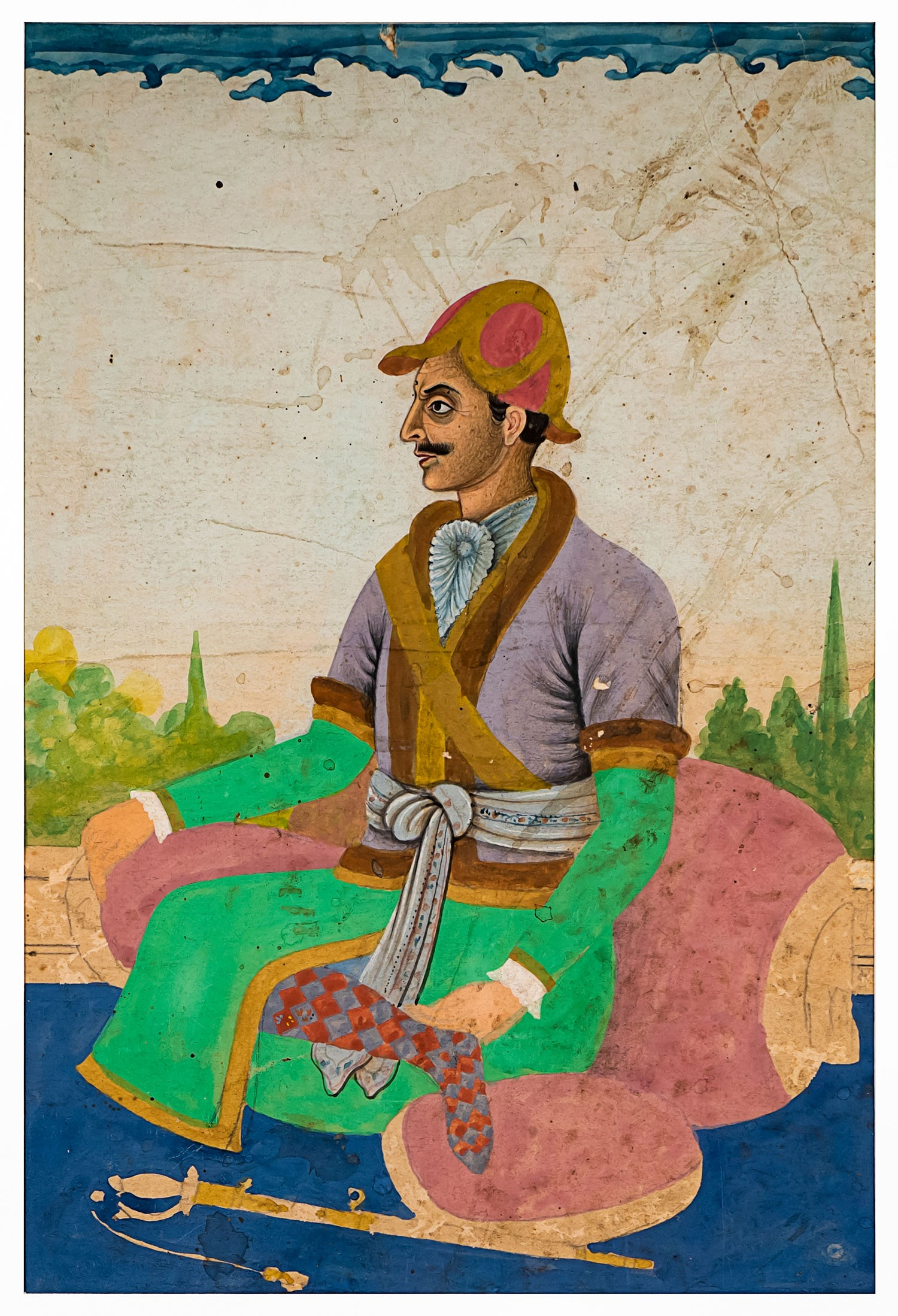
- longest reigning and most influential Mukhtiyar Bhimsen Thapa
- Government of Nepal
- Style: Shri Mukhtiyar Saa'b
- Status: Head of government
- Reports to: King of Nepal; Bharadars
- Residence: See list: Basantapur Durbar (Rana Bahadur Shah); Bagh Durbar (Bhimsen Thapa); Others
- Seat: Hanuman Dhoka
- Appointer: King of Nepal
- Term length: No fixed term; served at the pleasure of the King
- Precursor: Mulkaji
- Formation: 1804; 222 years ago
- First holder: Rana Bahadur Shah
- Final holder: Mathabarsingh Thapa
- Abolished: 1845; 181 years ago
- Succession: Prime Minister

The Mukhtiyar (Nepali: मुख्तियार) was a powerful office in the 19th-century Kingdom of Nepal, equivalent to a prime minister and second only to the Shah monarchs in authority. Serving as the highest executive position from 1804 to 1845, the Mukhtiyar effectively controlled the administration, military, and state affairs on behalf of the monarch. A total of seven individuals were appointed to the office during this period, two of whom served two separate terms. The office was abolished in 1845 and was succeeded by the office of Prime Minister.

== Etymology ==
Mukhtiyar is formed from two words: Mukhya and Akhtiyar. Mukhya means Chief and Akhtiyar means Authority. Altogether it means the "Executive Head of the State". Kumar Pradhan suggests that the word has Arabic origin and denotes "competent-to-do" or broadly "Commander-in-Chief".

== History ==
In 1806, the self denounced King Rana Bahadur Shah was made Mukhtiyar (chief authority) and Bhimsen Thapa tried to implement his schemes through Rana Bahadur. On the night of 25 April 1806, Sher Bahadur Shah, step-brother of Mukhtiyar in desperation drew a sword and killed Rana Bahadur Shah before being cut down by nearby courtiers, Bam Shah and Bal Narsingh Kunwar, also allies of Bhimsen. It triggered the Bhandarkhal massacre on the royal garden. On the grounds of the chaotic situation of the Bhandarkhal massacre, Bhimsen rose to the title of Mukhtiyar. The position of Mukhtiyar was under Pajani (Annual Renewal) system. During the annual muster of 1833, King Rajendra Bikram Shah delayed the retainment of Bhimsen's own position as the Mukhtiyar. On the false charge of murder of infant Prince Devendra on 1837, Bhimsen, his brother Ranbir Singh, his nephew Mathbar Singh, their families, the court physicians, Ekdev and Eksurya Upadhyay, and his deputy Bhajuman Baidya, with a few more of the nearest relatives of the Thapas were incarcerated, proclaimed outcasts, and their properties confiscated. Immediately after the incarceration of the Thapas, a new government with joint Mukhtiyars was formed with Ranganath Paudel as the head of civil administration, and Dalbhanjan Pande and Rana Jang Pande as joint heads of military administration. After about three months in power, under pressure from the opposing factions, the King removed Rana Jang as Mukhtiyar and Ranganath Paudel, who was favorably inclined towards the Thapas, was chosen as the sole Mukhtiyar. However, Ranganath Poudel, finding himself unsupported by the King, resigned from the Mukhtiyari, which was then conferred on Pushkar Shah; but Puskhar Shah was only a nominal head, and the actual authority was bestowed on Ranajang Pande. At the beginning of 1839, Ranjang Pande was made the sole Mukhtiyar. but Ranajang's inability to control the general lawlessness in the country forced him to resign from the office, which was then conferred on Puskar Shah, based on Senior Queen Samrajya Lakshmi's recommendation. There was also a brief army mutiny in June 1840. Brian Hodgson sent an indiscriminating report of mutiny to Governor General and he demanded the dissolution of the reigning government. Pushkar Shah and his Pande associates were dismissed by the King, and Fateh Jung Shah was appointed Mukhtiyar in November 1840. The Queen, seeking support of her own son's claims to the throne over those of Surendra, invited Mathabar Singh Thapa back after almost six years in exile. He was greeted with a grand welcome and was offered to lead the government. By December 1843, Mathabar Singh was appointed prime minister. Thus, the first Mukhtiyar to title himself as a prime minister, as per the British convention, was Mathabar Singh Thapa.

== List of Mukhtiyars ==
No.	Portrait	Name (Birth–Death)	Term of office	
No.	Portrait	Name (Birth–Death)	Took office	Left office
1		Rana Bahadur Shah (1775–1806)	26 February 1806	26 April 1806
2		Bhimsen Thapa (1775–1839)	1806	1837
3		Rana Jung Pande (1789–1843); 1st term	1837	1837
4		Ranga Nath Poudyal (1773–?); 1st term	1837	1838
5		Puskhar Shah (1784–1846)	1838	1839
(3)		Rana Jung Pande (1789–1843); 2nd term	1839	1840
(4)		Ranga Nath Poudyal (1773–?); 2nd term	1840	1840
6		Fateh Jung Shah (1805–1846); 1st term	November 1840	January 1843
7		Mathabar Singh Thapa (1798–1845)	November 1843	25 December 1843

== See also ==
- Kaji (Nepal)
- Mulkaji
- Government of Nepal
- Prime Minister of Nepal
- List of prime ministers of Nepal
- Chief of the Nepalese Army

== Bibliography ==
- Acharya, Baburam (1971), "The Fall of Bhimsen Thapa and The Rise of Jang Bahadur Rana" (PDF), Regmi Research Series, 3, Kathmandu: 214–219
- Acharya, Baburam (2012), Acharya, Shri Krishna (ed.), Janaral Bhimsen Thapa : Yinko Utthan Tatha Pattan (in Nepali), Kathmandu: Education Book House, p. 228, ISBN 9789937241748
- Kandel, Devi Prasad (2011). Pre-Rana Administrative System. Chitwan: Siddhababa Offset Press. p. 95.
- Nepal, Gyanmani (2007), Nepal ko Mahabharat (in Nepali) (3rd ed.), Kathmandu: Sajha, p. 314, ISBN 9789993325857
- Oldfield, Henry Ambrose (1880), Sketches from Nipal, Vol 1, vol. 1, London: W.H. Allan & Co.
- Pemble, John (2009), "Forgetting and remembering Britain's Gurkha War", Asian Affairs, 40 (3): 361–376, doi:10.1080/03068370903195154
- Pradhan, Kumar L. (2012), Thapa Politics in Nepal: With Special Reference to Bhim Sen Thapa, 1806–1839, New Delhi: Concept Publishing Company, p. 278, ISBN 9788180698132
