= Kunwar =

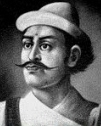
Sardar Ram Krishna Kunwar, prominent male ancestor of Ranas of Nepal

Kunwar (also spelt Kanwar, Kuar or Kaur) for Rajput is an Indian Royal title denoting a prince. It is derived from the Sanskrit word Rajkumar. It was traditionally associated with the feudal Rajputs such as the son of a Rana, Babu and Thakur. The title is used in royal Muslim Rajput families also.

The following are notable uses of the name Kunwar (also spelled as Konwar in Assam).

== In India ==
- Kunwar Amar, Indian dancer and actor
- Kunwar Mohammad Ashraf Ali Khan (1898-1975) Nawab of Sadabad and politician from Muslim Rajput family
- Gomdhar Konwar, a prince of the Ahom royal family of Assam, known for having led one of the first revolts against the British in India. Konwar was declared the last King of Assam.
- Devanand Konwar (1934-2020), Senior congressman from Assam, former Governor of the Indian states of Tripura, Bihar and West Bengal
- Kushal Konwar (1905-1943), Indian freedom fighter from Assam descended from Ahom Royal Family. He was hanged in 1942 during the Quit India Movement.
- Anita Kunwar, Indian actor
- Lal Kunwar, Empress of Mughal Empire
- Kunwar Narayan (1927-2017), Indian poet
- Kunwar Jitin Prasad (born 1973), Indian politician
- Babu Kunwar Singh (1777-1858; also known as Babu Konwar Singh and Kuer Singh), leader during the Indian Rebellion of 1857
- Kunwar Singh (1878-1959), first Indian Governor of Bombay, Prime Minister of Jammu and Kashmir (during Maharaja Hari Singh's rule) and also Dewan of Jodhpur
- Kunwar Bhim Singh (born 1941), Indian politician, activist, lawyer and author
- Kunwar Digvijay Singh (1922-1978), popularly known as "Babu", Indian field hockey player
- Kunwar Manvendra Singh (born 1950), Indian politician
- Kunwar Natwar Singh (born 1931), Indian politician
- Kunwar Nau Nihal Singh (1821-1840), ruler of the Punjab region of the Indian subcontinent
- Kunwar Pranav Singh (born 1966), Indian politician
- Kunwar Rewati Raman Singh (born 1943), Indian politician
- Kunwar Sarvraj Singh (born 1952), Indian politician
- Kunwar Sarvesh Kumar Singh (born 1952), Indian businessman and politician
- Kunwar Vikram Singh (born 1970), Indian royal

== In Nepal ==
- Baburam Kunwar (born 1960), first governor of Gandaki Province
- Bal Narsingh Kunwar (1783-1841), Nepalese military officer and courtier
- Balbhadra Kunwar (1789-1823), Nepalese military commander
- Bam Bahadur Kunwar (1818-1857), Ninth Prime Minister of Nepal
- Chandrabir Kunwar (died 1814), Nepalese governor and military commander
- Kabita Kunwar (born 2003), Nepalese cricketer
- Ram Krishna Kunwar (died 1771), Nepalese warlord during rule of King Prithvi Narayan Shah
- Ramjee Kunwar (born 1956), Trade Union Activist and politician
- Ranajit Kunwar (1753-c.1815), Nepalese military commander and governor
- Ranodip Singh Kunwar (1825-1885), Tenth Prime Minister of Nepal and Fifth Brother of Jung Bahadur
- Uttam Kunwar (1938–1982), Nepalese journalist and writer
- Dhir Shamsher Kunwar Rana (1828-1884), Commander-in-chief of the Nepalese Army, youngest brother of Jung Bahadur
- Jung Bahadur Kunwar Rana (1817-1877), Eighth Prime Minister of Nepal and Founder of Rana dynasty in Nepal
- Kunwar Indrajit Singh (1906-1982), 20th Prime Minister of Nepal. Royalty of Doti Region. Born as Indradhwoj Shahi later adopted title of Kunwar

== In Pakistan ==
- Kunwar Ali Roshan, Pakistani filmmaker
- Kunwar Khalid Yunus (born 1964), Pakistani politician

== See also ==
- Kunwar family, Nepalese dynasty of nobles of Gorkha Kingdom
- Kunwar family of Gorkha, a political Chhetri family of Nepal
- Veer Kunwar Singh University, a university in India
