= Dhir Shumsher Rana =

Nepalese politician, army general, and minister of state

Commanding-General Shree Isht Devata Charan Shree Madhara Jang Kumara Kumarangtamaya Shree Dhir Shumsher Rana Rana
- धीर शम्शेर कुँवर राणा
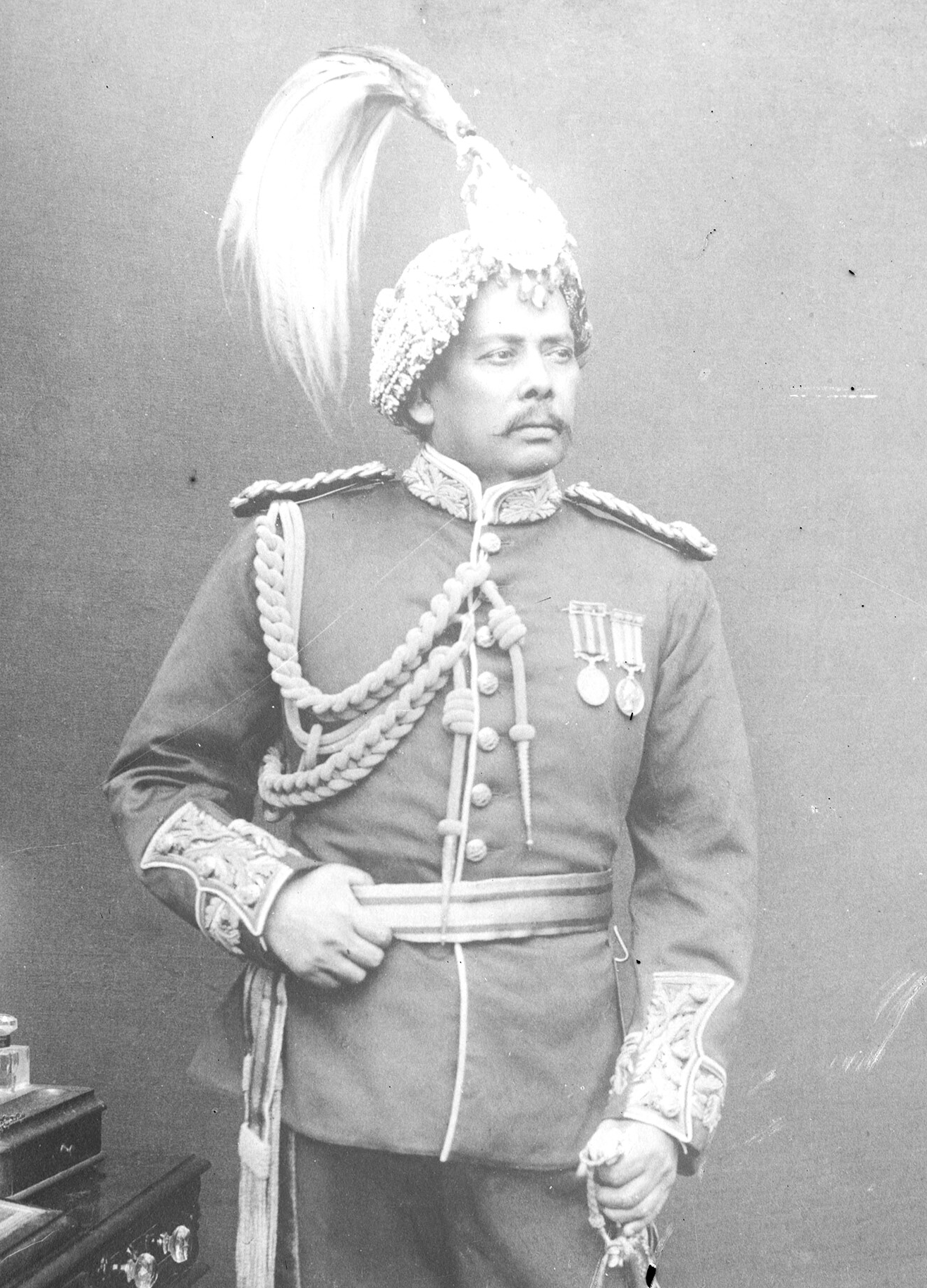
- Commander-In-Chief of the Nepalese Army Dhir Shumsher Kunwar Ranaji (1828–1884)

Commander-In-Chief of the Nepalese Army
- In office 11 May 1879 – 14 October 1884
- Monarchs: Surendra of Nepal; Prithvi Bir Bikram Shah
- Preceded by: Jagat Shumsher Rana
- Succeeded by: Jit Jung Rana

Personal details
- Born: c. 1828
- Died: 14 October 1884 Kathmandu, Kingdom of Nepal
- Spouse(s): Nanda Kumari Thapa (third wife); Juhar Kumari Devi (fifth wife)
- Children: see below
- Parents: Bal Narsingh Kunwar (father); Ganesh Kumari Thapa (Thapa dynasty) (mother)
- Relatives: see Kunwar family; see Rana dynasty; see Thapa dynasty; see Pande dynasty

Military service
- Allegiance: Nepal
- Battles/wars: Nepalese-Tibetan War; Indian Mutiny of 1857

Dhir Shumsher Kunwar (1828 – 1884 Kathmandu), after 1848 known as Dhir Shumsher Kunwar Ranaji (Nepali: धीर शम्शेर कुँवर राणाजी) or Dhir Shumsher Jang Kunwar Ranaji or shortly Dhir Shumsher Rana posthumously known as Dhir Shumsher Jang Bahadur Rana, was a Nepalese politician, army general, and minister of state. He served as the Commander-In-Chief of the Nepalese Army from 1879 to 1884.

He was born in Kunwar family as the youngest son of Kaji Bal Narsingh Kunwar and Ganesh Kumari Thapa, daughter of Kaji Nain Singh Thapa of Thapa dynasty. Dhir Shumsher was the youngest brother of Jang Bahadur Kunwar Ranaji, who rose to premiership of Nepal after the murders of influential persons – Mathabarsingh Thapa and Gagan Singh Bhandari and the Kot Massacre. Dhir was personally involved in the massacre, protecting his nearly slaughtered brother Krishna Bahadur Kunwar Rana. Dhir became military colonel after the incident. He was in the entourage of Jung Bahadur's visit of Europe in the early 1850s.

Dhir Shumsher led the Nepalese Army in the two victorious campaigns i.e. Nepalese-Tibetan War in 1855–1856 and in the Indian Mutiny of 1857. He consolidated greater power when his elder brother Commander-in-Chief Jagat Shamsher Kunwar Rana died in 1879. Onwards, he became the Commander-In-Chief of the Nepalese Army and was the stronghold behind the premiership of Shri Tin Maharaja Ranodip Singh Bahadur Kunwar Rana. He protected the premiership of his brother from a coup attempt by Jagat Jung Rana, eldest son of Jang Bahadur and Crown Prince Trailokya of Nepal in 1881–82 known as "38 Saalko Parva". His presence prevented the clash of his 17 sons against the sons of Jung Bahadur. His death in 1884 paved way for the consolidation of power by his 17 sons (Shamsher Ranas) through the murder of Premier Ranodip Singh Kunwar.

== Early life ==
He was born circa 1828 in the Kunwar family as the youngest son of Kaji Bal Narsingh Kunwar and Ganesh Kumari Thapa, daughter of Kaji Nain Singh Thapa and Rana Kumari Pande. His brothers from Ganesh Kumari were – Jang Bahadur, Bam Bahadur, Badri Narsingh, Krishna Bahadur, Ranodip Singh and Jagat Shamsher. His step brothers include – Bhakta Bir and Jaya Bahadur. He was known as "Sannani" in his family.

== Life ==
=== Kot Massacre and Europe visit ===
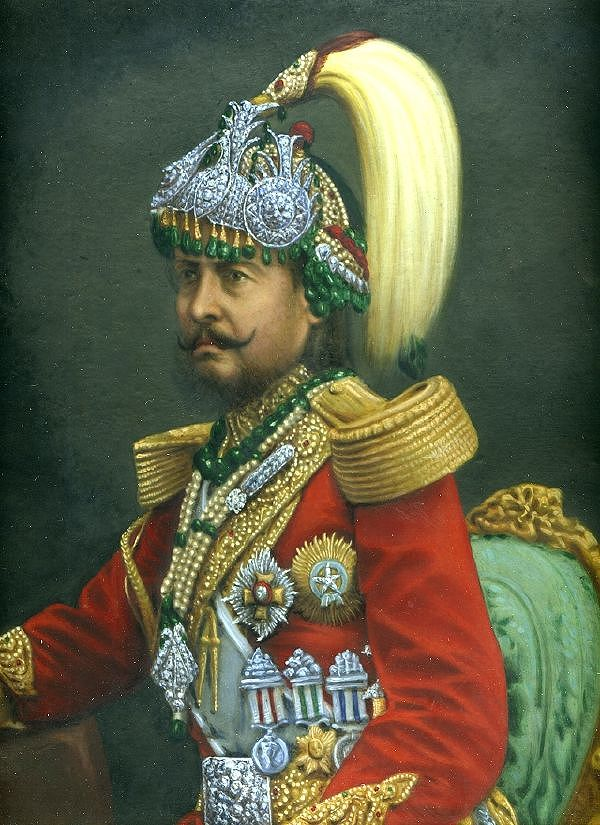
Jung Bahadur Kunwar, eldest brother of Dhir

Jung Bahadur Kunwar and his brothers massacred around 29 nobles in the Kot Massacre and consolidated the key administrative posts. Dhir Shumsher, the youngest brother of Jang Bahadur was crucial in the Kot Massacre, when he struck Khadga Vikram, who had attempted to attack one of his brothers, Krishna Bahadur Kunwar Rana. He received the military rank of colonel (Note: The use of English terms for their grades of command was common in the Nepalese army, but the powers of the different ranks did not correspond with those of the British system. The title of General was assumed by Bhimsen Thapa, as Commander-in-chief, and enjoyed by himself alone; of Colonels there were three or four only; all principal officers of the court, commanding more than one battalion. The title of Major was held by the adjutant of a battalion or independent company; and Captain was the next grade to colonel, implying the command of a corps. Luftun, or Lieutenant, was the style of the officers commanding companies under the Captain; and then followed the subaltern ranks of Soobadar, Jemadar, and Havildar, without any Ensigns.) on the subsequent day of Kot Massacre. He accompanied his eldest brother Prime Minister Jang Bahadur Rana in the 1851 Europe visit. He experienced new social entertainments during the tour of England. In one of the organized wrestling matches, Dhir defeated an English wrestling Champion. In his Paris tour, he received minor injuries when he was struck by a bullet from a young girl who misfired a shot from Jang Bahadur's pistol.

In the Vikram year 1910 (1853 A.D.), General Dhir Shumsher occupied the sixth position in the government among the members of the Rana family, and his yearly emoluments amounted to NPR 21,853.00.

=== 1855–56 Tibetan War ===
Government of Nepal declared war on Tibet on the grounds of mistreatment of Nepalese Newari traders and Nepalese representative (Nayak) in Lhasa, and Nepalese mission to Peking. The Kuti front was led by General Dhir Shumsher with 4678 troops under his control. On 3 April 1855, General Dhir Shumsher defeated a small Tibetan forces at Chusan and captured the Kuti front and further advanced to Suna Gompa. His victory at Kuti front was described by Jung Bahadur as:

Your occupation of Kuti has been a magnificent feat of valour. When a commander wins a battle with heavy casualties among his men, the credit is not so great. But when a battle is won without any loss of life, it is undoubtedly a fact to be commanded. I am very much pleased at the manner in which you have captured Kuti without any harm to the men under your command.

He built a logistics base in Duguna village near Listi in Nepal at the border. He led an attack on the fortress of Sona Gompa which had 8000 troops. The battle was fought with great difficulty on both sides and eventually, Tibetans retreated. On 5 November 1855, the Tibetan forces under General Kalon Shatra launched two simultaneous attacks in on the Nepalese camps at Kuti and Dzongka. The Nepalese forces faced heavily damage in Kuti by the surprise assault and the forces retreated to the border. In December 1855, Dhir Shumsher recaptured Kuti with the reinforcements sent by Jung Bahadur through a multi-directional assault on the Tibetan forces. (Note: The reinforcement sent was nine regiments.) He burned the town of Kuti before returning to Listi in Nepal. Later, Dhir Shumsher estimated to British Resident C.E.R. Girdlestone that a campaign in Tibet would cost NRs. 60 lakhs more than Nepal could hope to receive compensation and indemnification from Lhasa.

=== Indian Mutiny ===
Dhir Shumsher was ordered by Jang Bahadur to command 3000 Nepalese troops to Lucknow, Benaras and Patna in order to suppress Indian Mutiny of 1857. The Gorkhali forces restored the British authority in Lucknow and Gorakhpur and also succeeded in Bihar, Azampur, Jaunpur, Allahabad and Oudh. However, Dhir Shumsher had anti-British policy and he opposed Jang Bahadur's move to support British in the Indian Mutiny.

=== Middle years ===
According to the roll of succession of Ranas framed by Jang Bahadur on 10 Sudi Magh, 1924 V.S. (3 February 1868), Dhir was fourth in the position to the Prime Minister and was Commanding-General of the Eastern Command of Nepal Army. In 1871, Commanding-General Dhir Shumsher received wastelands in the Eastern hill region between Dudhkoshi river and Mechi River for the cultivation of tea.

=== Trials in Dharmakachari ===
Dharmakachari, the anti-corruption court, (Note: The Dharmakachari, or Anti-corruption Court, was established by Prime Minister Jung Bahadur in 1870 A.D. to try case of bribery, corruption, maladministration, violation of the law and the life, involving offices of all ranks (including Ranas) from the Prime Minister downwards. However, historian Baburam Acharya blames that Jung Bahadur had a political motive in creating this court, namely, to downgrade his brothers by bringing false charges against them and to upgrade his sons. The Kachahari was headed by an officer of the rank of Subba, and consisted of eleven members. It was dissolved by Prime Minister Ranoddip Singh in 1878. Another journal written by Kashinath Acharya Dikshit states that …During his later years, Jang Bahadur was dissatisfied with the manner in which his brothers functioned. He therefore formed a Dharmakachahari to hear cases of corruption against members of the Rana family.) held Ranoddip Singh and Jagat Shamsher guilty of taking bribes. But no charge was proved against Dhir Shumsher.

=== Family feuds and coup attempts ===
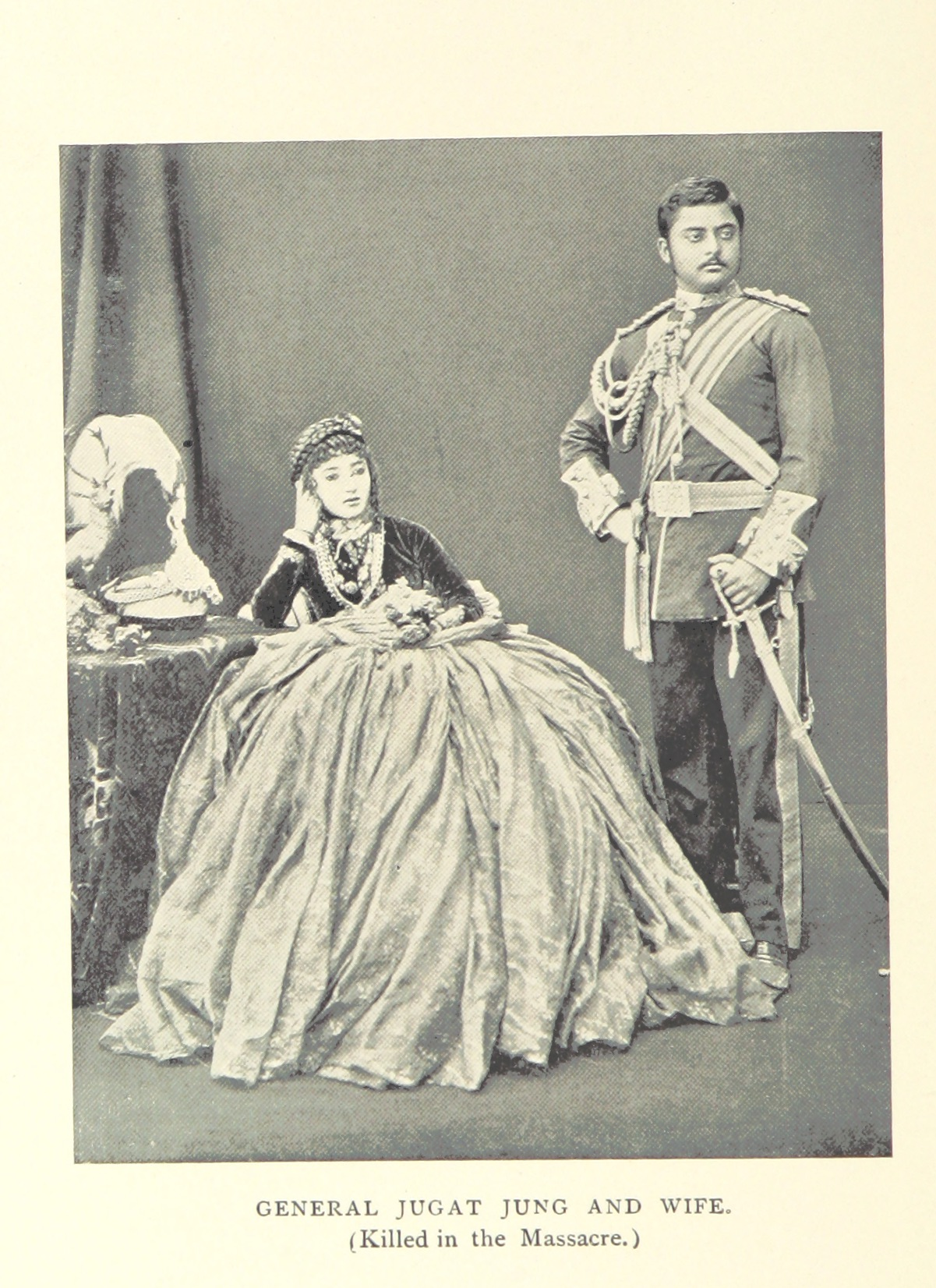
Jagat Jang, eldest son of Jang Bahadur, a nephew of Dhir Shumsher

Jang Bahadur died on Falgun 1933 V.S. (March 1877) at Rautahat. (Note: However, as per historians Bhuwan Joshi and Leo E. Rose, Jang Bahadur died in February 1877.) Dhir Shumsher circulated a rumour that Jang Bahadur was critically ill, upon which the Crown Prince Trailokya of Nepal and Jang Bahadur's sons rushed to Patharghatta. Dhir attended the funeral of Jang Bahadur with the Crown Prince Trailokya with whom he had quarreled throughout the way. On their absence in Kathmandu, he immediately imposed King Surendra of Nepal to declare Ranodip Singh Kunwar as Prime Minister of Nepal. Through this move, he destroyed the plot of Jang Bahadur's eldest son Jagat Jang and Crown Prince Trailokya's motive to force King Surendra to abdicate the throne and appoint Jagat Jang as the Prime Minister. When Prince Trailokya came back to Kathmandu after the funeral, he attempted to overthrow Dhir Shumsher from political scenario with the assistance of Jagat Jang Rana, the son of deceased Jang Bahadur.

When Commander-in-Chief Jagat Shamsher Kunwar Rana died in 1879, Dhir Shumsher succeeded him in the position. Dhir Shumsher did not want to transfer his current position of Senior Commanding-General of Western Commanding forces to Jagat Jang because the forces under Western Command were huge. This event further incensed the relationship of Dhir Shumsher with his nephew Jagat Jang. Shrivikram Singh Thapa, Sangramasur Bisht and a faction of Bharadars attempted twice in the year 1938 Vikram Samvat (1881–1882) to destroy both Ranodip Singh Kunwar (Prime Minister of Nepal) and Commander-In-Chief Dhir Shumsher Rana. Both attempts were aborted, and for the third attempt, the date of execution was fixed on last day of Poush (14 December 1881). In December 1881, Prime Minister Ranodip Singh went on a hunting trip to Terai. The conspirating faction sought the assistance of Lieutenant Uttardhwaj (Note: Historians Bhuwan Joshi and Leo E. Rose as well as Historian Ishwari Prasad referred the whistleblower as grandson of Gagan Singh.) who had ancestral rivalry with the Shrivikram Singh, a member of the conspirator group. Due to the rivalry, Lt. Uttardhwaj revealed the plot to Dhir Shumsher who was in Kathmandu. Dhir Shumsher immediately informed his brother Prime Minister Ranodip Singh Kunwar in Terai camp to arrest the conspirators in his entourage. Also, Dhir Shumsher arrested conspirators in Kathmandu on Magh Badi 2, 1938 Vikram Samvat with the help of Bam Bikram, a member of the conspiracy group. On the same night, the conspirators in the camp of Ranodip Singh were arrested and brought to Kathmandu. On Magh Badi 4, 1938 V.S. (January 1882), one of the conspirators, Subedar Simha Jang Pande took committed suicide by poison on the banks of Bagmati river at Teku while Sangramsur Bisht and Amrit Simha Adhikari revealed the conspiracy where Crown Prince Trailokya and Prince Narendra were involved. Jagat Jung and Bambir Bikram were removed out of role of succession of Ranas. Former Prime Minister Mathabarsingh Thapa's two sons – Colonel Bikram Singh Thapa and Colonel Amar Singh Thapa were also convicted aloongwith Colonel Indra Singh Shripali Tandon, Dhir Man Singh Basnyat and Kulman Singh Basnyat. A lot of nobles and courtiers were beheaded, imprisoned and degraded from their caste after the Prime Minister Ranodip Singh returned on Magh Badi 11, 1938.

=== Administration ===
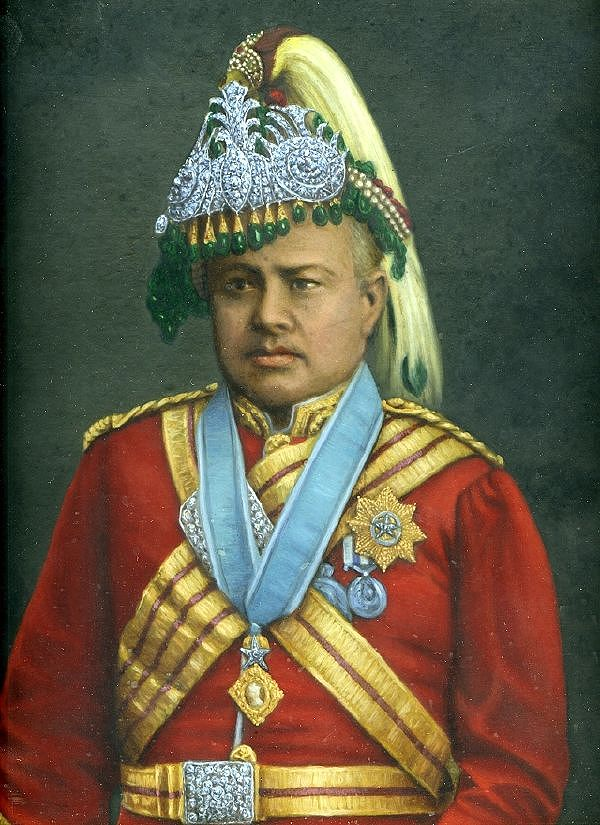
Prime Minister Ranodip Singh Kunwar; elder brother of Dhir Shumsher

Historians John Whelpton, Ishwari Prasad contended that Dhir Shumsher was the main support to the administration of Prime Minister Ranodip Singh Kunwar. Historian Perceval Landon described him as Chief Executive of Nepal when he was appointed as Commander-in-Chief. Until his death in 1884, Dhir Shumsher controlled the real authority as Ranodip Singh had an ill health and was a fragile ruler. Ranodip Singh did not act anything contrary to Dhir Shumsher and always contended him. Similarly, Dhir did not allow the British authorities to receive any Gorkhali recruits from Nepal while Ranodip Singh favoured it. His death allowed Ranodip Singh to permit Gorkhali recruitment in British Army.

As a Commanding General, Dhir Shumsher directed Subba Jayashankar Pande with the reduction of land taxes in Dang on Baisakh Badi 2, 1936 (Vikrama). (Note: From Commanding-General Dhir Shumsher Jung Bahadur, To Subba Jayashankar Pande. The Chaudharis and Mahatos of Dang have submitted the following report: On Raikar lands, (taxes) have been remitted (on plots allotted to) plowhands and other agriculture laborers. The territories comprising the Rajya of Salyan will not became populous, if some tax concessions are not granted there. The ryots demand that they should be given the facilities that have been sanctioned in the adjoining areas. Reports have been received from the revenue office (Mal Kachahari) of the Rajya that the ryots will be satisfied, and lands will be reclaimed, if (the land tax) is reduced to one-seventh (of the produce) in those villages (mouja) where it is being collected at present at the rate of one-sixth, and to one-sixth (of the produce) in these villages where it is being collected at present at the rate of one-fifth, as in Chitaun. On Karkit Badi 9, 1935 (Vikrama) we had approved this proposal. However, no tax-remission was allowed (for plots occupied by) plowhands and other agricultural laborers. We hereby confirm that order. Baisakh Badi 2, 1936 (Vikrama).) On Ashadh Badi 10, 1938 (Vikrama), he also redirected Subba Pande to collect land taxes of the occupied wastelands in the region. (Note: From Commanding-General Dhir Shumsher Jung Bahadur, To Subba Jayashankar Pande. You have submitted the following proposal: Unirrigable lands in Tuhi, Babaipar, and other areas of Dang, are lying waste because of the depredations of tigers, bears, and wild boar. Ryots have removed rocks and boulders from these lands and reclaimed them. If the tax on such lands is fixed on a contractual basis at Rs 2½ per plow, it would be collected easily, and settlement would be promoted there. Otherwise, the ryots will continue occupying these lands, and no revenue will be collected from them. We hereby approve this proposal. We also direct that new ryots should not be made liable to make the same payments as these cultivating old lands. Ashadh Badi 10, 1938 (Vikrama).) He also reinstated the mail services at Chitwan executed from the orders of Kartik Badi 9, 1939 Vikrama (October 1882).

== Allowances ==
As a Commander-in-Chief, Dhir Shumsher received an annual allowance of NRs 16,000.

== Family and personal life ==
He had five wives. He married a sister of Lalit Man Singh Basnyat, Nanda Kumari Thapa (sister of Keshar Singh Thapa) and Juhar Kumari Devi of a noble Rajput family of Kangra.

=== Sons ===
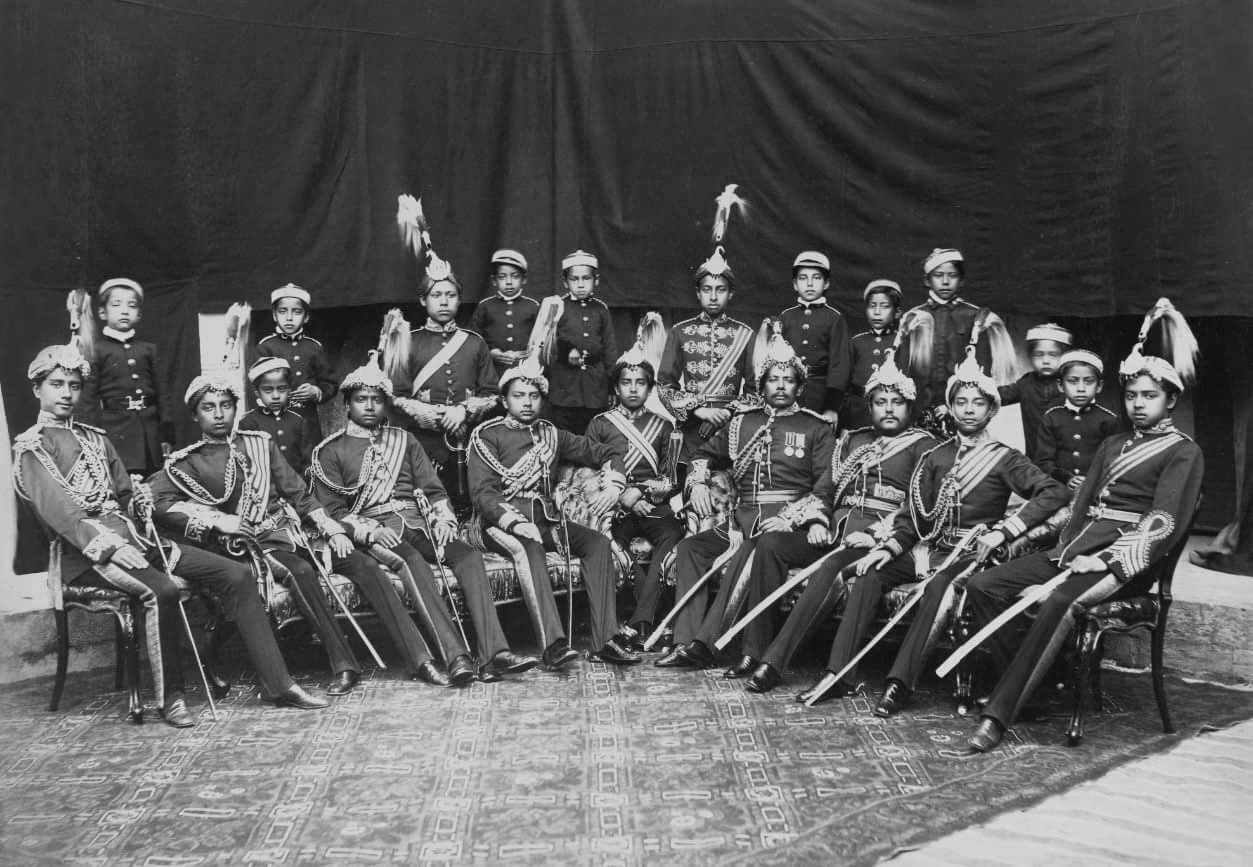
Dhir Shumsher Rana and all his 17 sons, making the Shamsher Rana faction of Rana dynasty

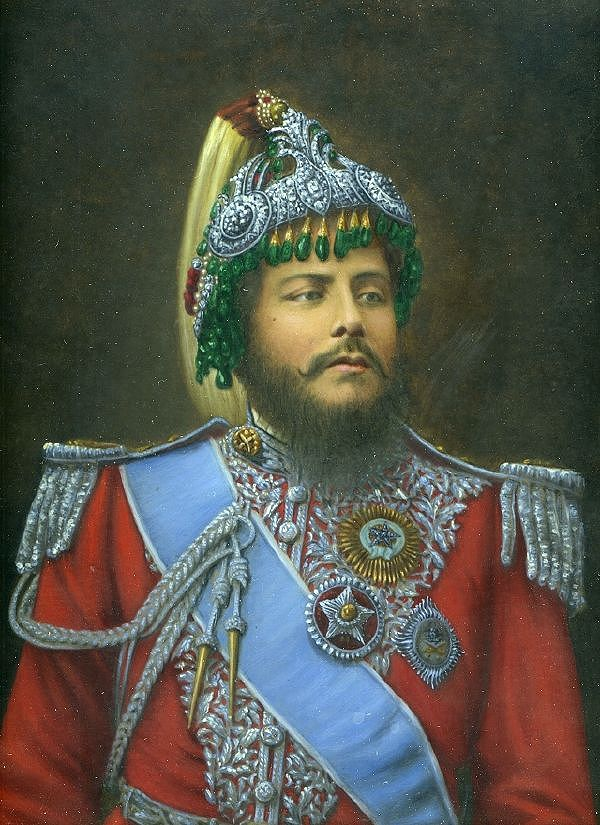
Bir Shamsher Jang Bahadur Rana, eldest son of Dhir Shumsher; later Maharaja of Kaski and Lamjung and Prime Minister of Nepal

He had 17 sons and 17 daughters. The seventeen sons of Dhir Shumsher were known as Shamsher faction, Satra Bhai ('seventeen brothers'), or the Shamsher Rana dynasty. They began to append the name and title of Jang Bahadur Rana to their own name. They became influential with five of them being Commander-in-chief of the Nepalese Army Prime Minister of Nepal and Maharaja of Kaski and Lamjung in continuous succession between 1885 and 1945. Similarly, only two grandsons of Dhir Shumsher became the Maharaja of Lamjung and Kaski. Many historians contend that the Shumsher Ranas were responsible for the dark period in the history of Nepal. Among the seventeen sons, only nine were high caste Ranas (A or B) while remaining eight were C Class Ranas who were born out of mistresses and ritually low caste women. The list of seventeen sons of Dhir Shumsher are:

1. Bir Shamsher Jang Bahadur Rana (by sister of Lalit Man Singh Basnet) (Prime Minister of Nepal)
2. Dambar Shamsher Jung Bahadur Rana (by Gharti lady) (Aide-de-camp general of the Prime Minister)
3. Khadga Shamsher Jang Bahadur Rana (by Nanda Kumari Thapa) (Commander-in-chief of the Nepalese Army)
4. Rana Shumsher Jung Bahadur Rana (Commander-in-chief of the Nepalese Army)
5. Dev Shamsher Jang Bahadur Rana (by Nanda Kumari Thapa) (Prime Minister of Nepal)
6. Chandra Shamsher Jang Bahadur Rana (by Nanda Kumari Thapa) (Prime Minister of Nepal)
7. Bhim Shamsher Jung Bahadur Rana (by Nanda Kumari Thapa) (Prime Minister of Nepal)
8. Fatte Shamsher Jung Bahadur Rana
9. Lalit Shamsher Jung Bahadur Rana
10. Jit Shamsher Jung Bahadur Rana
11. Durga Shamsher Jung Bahadur Rana
12. Purna Shamsher Jung Bahadur Rana
13. Jadu Shamsher Jung Bahadur Rana
14. Shere Shamsher Jung Bahadur Rana
15. Juddha Shamsher Jung Bahadur Rana (by Juhar Kumari Devi, a Rajput wife from Kangra) (Prime Minister of Nepal)
16. Khamba Shamsher Jung Bahadur Rana
17. Harka Shamsher Jung Bahadur Rana

Among the Shamsher factions, families of Chandra Shamsher and Juddha Shamsher were mostly A Class and later they removed all B and C Class Ranas from power in March 1934.

=== Daughters ===
One of daughter of Dhir Shumsher, Princess Khadga Divyeshwari Devi was married to Chautariya Lakshmi Narayan Shah of Salyan. In Vikrama 1966, she received a house on inheritable Bakas-Birta tenure from King Prithvi Bir Bikram Shah Dev.

== Personality ==
Indian Historian Ishwari Prasad opines that Dhir Shumsher "…possessed the qualities of a soldier and a statesman and was fully acquainted with the condition of Nepal." Laurence Oliphant who met Jang Bahadur and Dhir Shumsher at Ceylon in their return journey from Europe wrote following about Dhir:

Colonel Dhir is most jovial, light-hearted and unselfish being imaginably, brave as lion – as recent events in Nepal have proved – always anxious to please and full of amusing conversation. I know of no one I would rather have by my side in a row than the young Colonel, and his brother Jung evidently thought so too when he chose him to assist in the capture of the conspirators in the attempt on his life.

Historian Ishwari Prasad writes about:

A sagacious and farsighted military leader, Dhir was man of extraordinary commonsense and political insight and enjoyed fully the confidence of his intrepid and statesman like his brother. There was no matter of administrative details with which he was not acquainted and his intimate knowledge of the affairs of Nepal and his power of quick and correct decision entitled him to be regarded as a pillar of the state by his contemporaries.

Writer Madhvi Yashin described Dhir as "…a man of blood and iron." Similarly, Writer Charles Allen also described Dhir as "… both a hard-bitten warrior and a statesman." He further contends that Dhir "…He effectively ruled Nepal in his brother’s name and through a series of succession passed to his own male line."

== Memorials ==
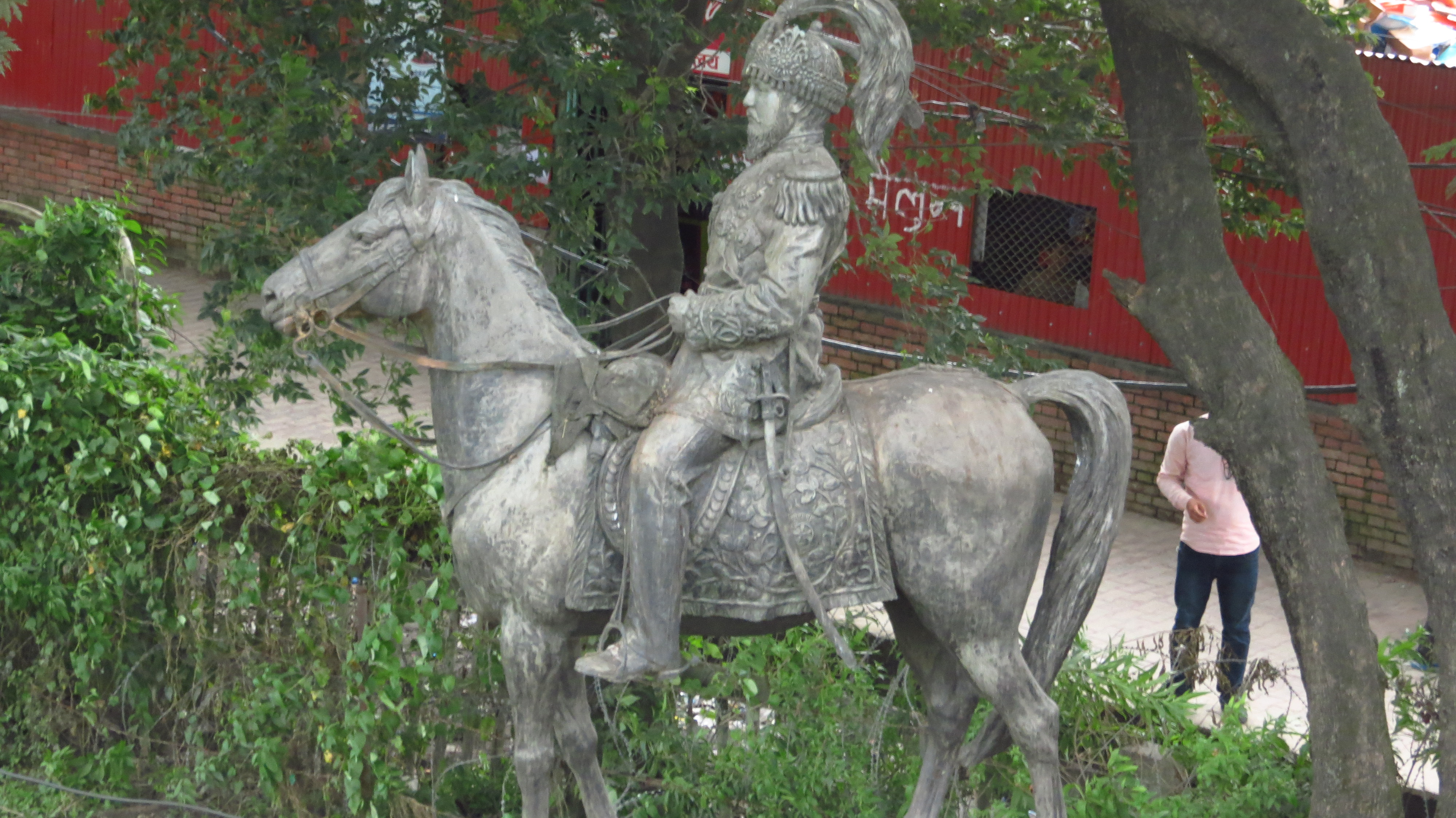
equestrian statue of Dhir Shumsher

An equestrian statue of Dhir Shumsher was constructed at the middle of Tundikhel.

== Death and aftermath ==
Dhir Shumsher did not manage the role of succession to favour his eldest son Bir Shamsher. Dhir Shumsher died on 14 October 1884. His death cleared way for his sons to overpower their cousins and conduct the 1885 Shamsher coup where Prime Minister Ranodip Singh Kunwar and Jung Bahadur's eldest son Jagat Jung was killed as all factions of Ranas knew that Jagat Jung would murder and destroy Shamsher family if he succeeded the uncle Maharaja Ranodip Singh Kunwar. By the coup of 1885, Shamsher brothers established the "rule of seventeen brothers" and a new era in Nepal.

== Ancestry ==
Ancestors of Dhir Shumsher Rana

16. Ahirama Kunwar
8. Ramakrishna Kunwar
4. Ranajit Kunwar
2. Bal Narsingh Kunwar
1. Dhir Shumsher Kunwar Rana
24. Birbhadra Thapa
12. Amar Singh Thapa (sanukaji)
6. Nain Singh Thapa
13. Satya Rupa Maya
3. Ganesh Kumari Thapa
28. Tularam Pande
14. Ranajit Pande
7. Rana Kumari Pande

== Gallery ==
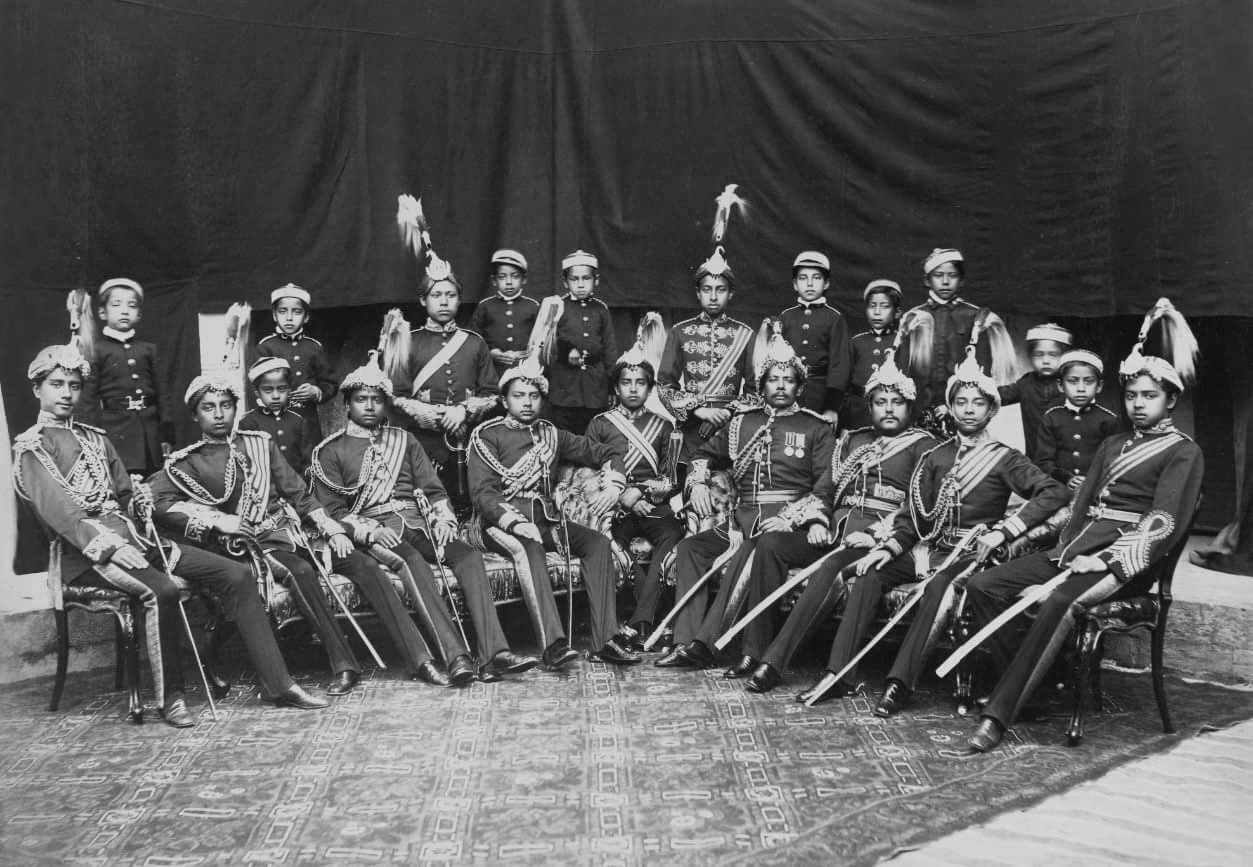
Dhir Shumsher Rana and all his 17 sons making Shamsher dynasty

== Books ==
- Acharya, Baburam (1 May 1974) [1972], "The 1882 IncidentsX" (PDF), Regmi Research Series, 6 (5): 91–94
- Regmi, Mahesh Chandra (1 February 1975a), "Some Administration Office of the Rana Period" (PDF), Regmi Research Series, 7 (2): 31–34
- Narharinath, Yogi (1 February 1975b), "Land Taxes in DangX" (PDF), Regmi Research Series, 7 (2): 35
- Regmi, Mahesh Chandra (1 January 1976a), "The Rana Elite" (PDF), Regmi Research Series, 8 (1): 16–19
- Regmi, Mahesh Chandra (1 October 1976b), "New Cash Crops in the Tarai Region" (PDF), Regmi Research Series, 8 (10): 195–198
- Regmi, Mahesh Chandra (June 1983a), "Mail Services to Chitwan, 1882" (PDF), Regmi Research Series, 15 (6): 82–84
- Regmi, Mahesh Chandra (September 1983b), "Allowances for Rana Colonels" (PDF), Regmi Research Series, 15 (9): 144
- Regmi, Mahesh Chandra (July 1989), "Some Bakas-Birta Grants" (PDF), Regmi Research Series, 21 (7): 91–94
- Whelpton, John (2005). A History of Nepal. Cambridge University Press. ISBN 978-0521804707.
- Adhikari, Indra (2015), Military and Democracy in Nepal, Routledge, ISBN 9781317589068
- Prasad, Ishwari (1 January 1996). The Life and Times of Maharaja Juddha Shumsher Jung Bahadur Rana of Nepal. APH Publishing. ISBN 978-81-7024-756-2.
- Shaha, Rishikesh (1990), Modern Nepal 1769–1885, Riverdale Company, ISBN 0-913215-64-3
- Joshi, Bhuwan Lal; Rose, Leo E. (1966), Democratic Innovations in Nepal: A Case Study of Political Acculturation, University of California Press
- Rose, Leo E. (1971). Nepal; strategy for survival. University of California Press. ISBN 9780520016439.
- Prinsep, Henry Thoby (1825). History of the Political and Military Transactions in India During the Administration of the Marquess of Hastings, 1813–1823. Vol. 1. London: Kingsbury, Parbury & Allen. OCLC 152785969.
- Girdlestone, C.E.R. (June 1884) [16 January 1884], "Girdlestone to GOI", Secret E., 442
- Tribhuvan University (1978). Voice of History. Vol. 4–6. Kirtipur: Tribhuvan University.
- Kumar, Satish (1967). Rana polity in Nepal; origin and growth. Asia Pub. House.
- Singh, Nagendra Kr (1997). Nepal: Refugee to Ruler: A Militant Race of Nepal. APH Publishing. p. 125. ISBN 9788170248477.
- Tyagi, Sushila (1974). Indo-Nepalese Relations: (1858 - 1914). India: Concept Publishing Company.
- Upadhyaya, Shreeram Prasad (1 January 1992). Indo-Nepal trade relations: a historical analysis of Nepal's trade with the British India. India: Nirala Publications. ISBN 9788185693200.
- Yashin, Madhvi (1994). India's foreign policy: the Dufferin years. India: Raj Publications. ISBN 9788186208014.
- Allen, Charles (2010). The Buddha and Dr. Führer: An Archaeological Scandal. India: Penguin Books India, 2010. ISBN 9780143415749.
- Uprety, Prem Raman (1980). Nepal-Tibet Relations, 1850-1930: Years of Hopes, Challenges, and Frustrations. Puga Nara.
- Rahul, Ram (1996). Royal Nepal: a political history. Vikas publishing house. ISBN 9788125900702.
- Adhikari, Krishna Kant (1984), Nepal Under Jang Bahadur, 1846-1877, vol. 1, Nepal: Buku, ISBN 9788180698132
