= Kunwar family =

Noble Chhetri family of Gorkha Kingdom

Kunwar family कुँवर वंश/कुँवर खलक
- Noble house
- Parent family: Kunwar khas chhetri
- Country: Kingdom of Nepal; Gorkha Kingdom
- Founded: 18th century
- Founder: Ahirama Kunwar (historical); Ram Singh Rana (legendary)
- Current head: currently as pretender
- Final ruler: Jang Bahadur Kunwar Rana (Ramkrishna family); Balbhadra Kunwar (Jayakrishna family)
- Titles: Hereditary Title of Kaji; Governor of Janalikot Achham District(Khulal Kunwar); Sardar of Kingdom of Gorkha; Governor of Garhwal Province; Governor of Jumla Province; Governor of Dhankuta Province; Governor of Pyuthan Province; Governor of Dadheldhura Province
- Styles: Kaaji Saheb; Kunwar Ranaji, Kunwar Kaji
- Estates: Bhanwarkot and Dhulikhel
- Dissolution: 15 May 1848 (conversion to Rana dynasty)
- Cadet branches: Rana dynasty
- A section of Kunwars titled themselves as "Rana" onwards 1848 CE.

The Kunwar family (Nepali: कुँवर परिवार) was a noble Khas-Chhetri family in the Gorkha Kingdom and the Kingdom of Nepal. The Kunwars were linked to the Thapa dynasty and family of Amar Singh Thapa by marital lineages and, thus, to Pande dynasty through the Thapa dynasty. Three branches of the Kunwars; Ramakrishna, Jayakrishna and Amar Singh Kunwar were formed with opposite political aspirations. Bal Narsingh Kunwar (of Ramkrishna section) supported Mukhtiyar Bhimsen Thapa while Chandrabir Kunwar (of Jayakrishna section) supported Bada Kaji Amar Singh Thapa due to their marital relations with those families. Later, the Ramakrishna section of the family including Amarsingh established the Rana dynasty of Nepal and styled themselves as Rana Rajputs while Jayakrishna most section remained as Kunwars.

== Origins ==
=== Genealogy ===
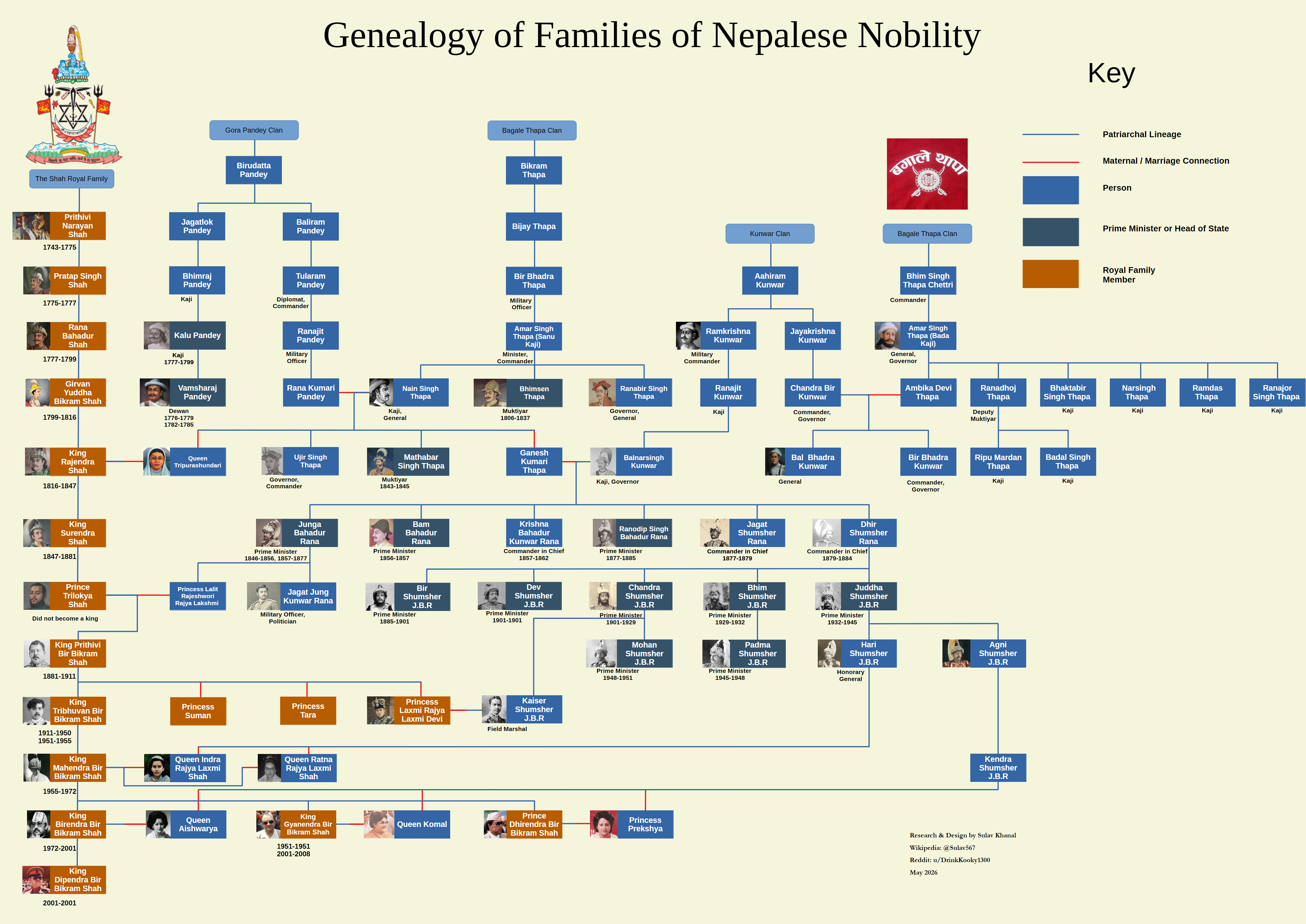
The relation between the Thapa, Kunwar, Rana, Pandey, and Shah families of Nepal showcasing the transfer of power throughout the history of Nepal.

The Kunwars of Nepal claim descent from a Rajput man named Ram Singh, who was said to belong to Kshatriya Varna. He was considered to have settled in Bhirkot, Nepal in 1404 A.D. The chronicler Daniel Wright has published a genealogy of the Kunwar family. The genealogy begins with Tattā Rāṇā as the Raja (King) of Chittaurgarh. His nephew, Fakht Siṃha Rāṇā, had a son named Rāma Siṃha Rāṇā who came to hills with four followers after the siege of Chittaurgarh. (Note: Daniel Wright did not mentioned the location of the hill where Ram Singh settled while a Kunwar pretender claims it to be Bhirkot in Western Nepal. However, he claims the date of migration of Ram Singh after the fall of Chittaur as on 1404 A.D. while historical fall of Chittaur occurred on 1303 A.D., 1535 A.D. and 1568 A.D.) He and his four followers joined the services of a hill Raja for ten or twelve months. The Raja learned the art of fencing from Rāma Siṃha and made him a personal tutor. He wanted to retain Rāma Siṃha in his country. Thus, the hill Raja asked for the daughter of Raja (King) of Bīnātī, a Bagāle Kṣetrī and married her to Rāma Siṃha. They had six sons over 10 –12 years, one of whom was given the title of Kum̐vara Khaḍkā for bravery displayed in the battle against Raja of Satān Koṭ. The title passed down to his descendants. Rāma Siṃha suddenly met his younger brother who requested him to return to Chittaur for once and Rāma Siṃha died on the way there. The hill Raja made Rāma Siṃha's son, Rāut Kunwar, was a nobleman (Sardār) and commander of the army. Ahirāma Kunwar, the son of Rāut Kunwar, was invited by the King of Kaski and was ennobled with a birta or jagir of Dhuage Saghu village. The King of Kaski asked the hand of Ahirāma's daughter, who was a great beauty, through only Kalas Puja to which Ahirāma replied to give his daughter only through a legal marriage. The king brought his troops and tried to take over the village by force. Ahirāma was supported by the village inhabitants belonging to the Parājulī Thāpā caste and a war was broke out. On the same day, Ahirāma took his immediate family including three sons, Ram Krishna Kunwar, Jaya Krishna Kunwar and Amar Singh Kunwar, to the King of Gorkha, Prithvi Narayan Shah, where the lands of Kunwar-Khola were given to them as birta.

John Whelpton opines that the legend of the Kunwar family's origins, which says their progenitor to have entered hill and married a daughter of Bagale Kshetri, might have linked their family to the Bagale Thapa, a clan of Mukhtiyar Bhimsen Thapa.

=== Caste Background ===
This family was a minor section of the Khas-Chhetri aristocratic families of Gorkha under King Prithvi Narayan Shah. Kunwar was historically a Chhetri and a Khadka clan. The Kunwar family genealogy also states the title of 'Kunwar Khadka' taken by the ancestors of the Kunwar family.After his premiership, Kunwars through a royal order took up the title of Rana and claimed themselves as Rajput family of Chittor in India. According to writer Purushottama Śamaśera Ja Ba Rāṇā, the Kunwar family belonged to the House of "Gehlauta Chhettriya" which was one of the 36 Raj Bamshis (royal caste). The cadet branch of the Kunwars, the Rana dynasty, claimed to be Rajputs of western Indian origin, rather than the native Khas Kshatriyas despite they spoke Khas language and attempted to disassociate from their Khas past. According to some historians, Nepalese ruling families have claimed Indian Rajput descent for political purposes.

== Historicity ==
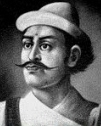
Sardar Ram Krishna Kunwar, a prominent member of Kunwar family of Nepal

Ahiram Kunwar was a nobleman of the Kingdom of Kaski. Later, he went to the Kingdom of Gorkha and joined service to King Prithvi Narayan Shah. Ahiram Kunwar had three sons: Ram Krishna Kunwar, Jaya Krishna Kunwar and Amar Singh Kunwar. Ram Krishna was a prominent military general of King Prithvi Narayan Shah. In a letter to Ramkrishna, King Prithvi Narayan Shah was unhappy about the death of Kaji Kalu Pande and thought it was impossible to conquer Kathmandu Valley after the death of Kalu Pande. After the annexation of Kathmandu valley, in his letter King Prithvi Narayan Shah praised the valour and wisdom of Ramkrishna in annexation of Kathmandu, Lalitpur and Bhaktapur (i.e. a Nepal valley at the time) in 1768-69 A.D. The Gorkhali monarch also expresses condolence in that letter over the death of one of the brothers of Ram Krishna in the battle of Timal. Another index letter sent by King Rana Bahadur Shah to Jaya Krishna Kunwar in 1843 Vikram Samvat (i.e. 1786 A.D.) confirms that Jaya Krishna did not die in the battle of Timal, which could point to the death of his youngest brother, Amar Singh Kunwar, in the battle. When Ram Krishna was conferred the confiscated properties (including the residence) of former Kathmandu King Jaya Prakash Malla, he donated the properties to "Guthi" for supplying foods to pilgrims in the Shivaratri festival. King Prithvi Narayan Shah had deployed Sardar Ram Krishna to the invasion of Kirant regional areas comprising; Pallo Kirant, Wallo Kirant and Majh Kirant. In 13th of Bhadra 1829 Vikram Samvat (i.e. 29 August 1772), Ram Krishna crossed Dudhkoshi river to invade King Karna Sen of Kirant and Saptari region with fellow commander Abhiman Singh Basnyat. He crossed Arun River to reach Chainpur. Later, he achieved victory over the Kirant region. King Prithvi Narayan Shah bestowed 22 pairs of Shirpau (special headgear) in appreciation to Ram Krishna Kunwar after his victory over the Kirant region.

=== Ram Krishna family/Rana Kunwars ===
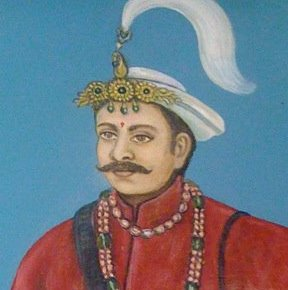
Kaji Bal Narsingh Kunwar, a prominent member of Ramkrishna branch of Kunwars

Ram Krishna had only one son named Ranajit Kunwar. Ranajit Kunwar was a Subah (governor) of the Jumla province in the Kingdom of Nepal. The people of Jumla had rebelled against Ranajit Kunwar in 1849 V.S. Ranajit participated in the famed battle of Khadbuda on Magh 20, 1860 V.S. (January 1804) where the Gorkhalis under Amar Singh Thapa defeated King Pradyumna Shah of Garhwal under his Gujjar commander Ram Dayal Singh who led 12,000 soldiers of Ramghads, Pundirs, Gujjars and Rajputs. Ranajit had three sons: Bal Narsingh Kunwar, Balram Kunwar and Rewant Kunwar. Bal Narsingh was initially a follower of the renounced King Rana Bahadur Shah and Kaji Bhimsen Thapa, and followed the King in his exile to Banaras on 1 May 1800. On the night of 25 April 1806, King Rana Bahadur was murdered by his step-brother Sher Bahadur in desperation after which Bal Narsingh immediately killed the King's assassin. He was a close ally of the influential minister Bhimsen Thapa, who initiated a great massacre at the Bhandarkhal garden following the chaos from the King's murder. Following closeness to Mukhtiyar Bhimsen, he became the son-in-law of Bhimsen's brother Kaji Nain Singh Thapa of Thapa dynasty. The close relatives and supporters of the Thapa faction replaced the old courtiers and administrators. The Kunwar family (of Bal Narsingh) came to power being relatives of powerful Mukhtiyar Bhimsen Thapa. Sons of Bal Narsingh were related to the Pande dynasty by their maternal grandmother Rana Kumari Pande who was the daughter of Mulkaji Ranajit Pande. Bal Narsingh retired as Kaji in 1838 AD. Balram Kunwar, the middle brother of Bal Narsingh, spent ten years as a captain. Rewanta Kunwar, the youngest brother of Bal Narsingh, was Kaji until 1830 AD. Rewant was appointed as the mission head to resolve grievances of the people of Kumaon. Rewanta was involved in the Anglo-Nepalese war as reinforcement and took a position in Jayantgadh with cousin Balbhadra Kunwar.

Jang Bahadur Kunwar, the son of Bal Narsingh, consolidated the position of Prime Minister of Nepal after having initiated the Kot massacre (Kot Parva) and the Bhandarkhal Parva (massacre). This fraction became known as the Rana dynasty after styling themselves as Kunwar Ranaji after having claimed descent from Ranas of Mewar on May 15, 1848 and ultimately became royal after declaration of Jang as Maharaja (Great King) of Kaski and Lamjung on August 6, 1856,.

=== Jaya Krishna family ===
Jaya Krishna Kunwar had a son named Chandrabir Kunwar. Chandra Bir was the Subah (governor) of one-third of the Garhwal province in the Kingdom of Nepal. He replaced Hasti Dal Shah as the Subba of Garhwal. Chandrabir was a resident of Bhanwarkot. He married the sister of Kaji Ranajor Thapa and was a son-in-law of Bada Amar Singh Thapa He had three sons: Bira Bhadra Kunwar, Bir Bhadra Kunwar and Balbhadra Kunwar. Birabhadra Kunwar was the Sardar until 1818 AD, when he was appointed Captain and remained in office until 1838 AD. A royal order by the government of Bhimsen Thapa was issued in 1887 Vikram Samvat Chaitra Badi 6, to Captain Birabhadra to resolve the irrigation dispute in Mahottari Another was issued in 1887 Vikram Samvat Chaitra Badi 8, to collect taxes at the fixed rate and refund the excess collection. Similarly, Birabhadra had ample instructions directed to him for running the administration of Saptari and Mahottari around 1887 V.S.

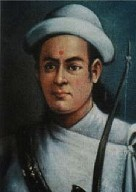
Captain Balbhadra Kunwar, commander of Nalapani fort in the distinguished Battle of Nalapani

Balbhadra Kunwar fought as a significant commander in the Anglo-Nepalese War and rose to heroics. When Major-General Rollo Gillespie's division penetrated Nepal's frontier to initiate Anglo-Nepalese war, Captain (Note: "The use of English terms for their grades of command was common in the Gurkha army, but the powers of the different ranks did not correspond with those of the British system. The title of general was assumed by Bhimsen Thapa, as commander-in-chief, and enjoyed by himself alone; of colonels there were three or four only; all principal officers of the court, commanding more than one battalion. The title of major was held by the adjutant of a battalion or independent company; and captain was the next grade to colonel, implying the command of a corps. Luftun, or lieutenant, was the style of the officers commanding companies under the captain; and then followed the subaltern ranks of soobadar, jemadar, and havildar, without any ensigns.") Balbhadra Kunwar was tasked with the fortification of the region as the Nepalese had anticipated that Dehra Dun would be the first place of assault. He withdrew from Dehradun and moved his force of about 600, including dependants, to the small fort of Nalapani, Khalanga. A letter was sent by the British to Balbhadra, summoning him to surrender the fort to which Balbhadra responded by tearing it up. The letter was delivered to him at midnight, he observed that "it was not customary to receive or answer letters at such unreasonable hours". The first British attack on Nalapani took place on October 31, the day before the official declaration of war. Maj-Gen. Rollo Gillespie died on that day and the British ceased the battle. The second attack resumed on November 25, and for three days the fort was bombarded until at noon on November 27, a large section of the northern wall finally gave away. However, the day ended with the British assault force withdrawing after having spent two hours pinned outside the wall, exposed to heavy fire from the garrison, and having suffered significant losses. After two failed attempts to capture the fort by straightforward attacks, the British resorted to attrition tactics. On November 28, instead of launching another infantry assault, the fort was encircled from all sides and placed under siege which prevented the Nepalese reinforcements from entering the fort. Mawbey then instructed his scouts to locate and cut off the fort's external water source. The water situation was made worse for the defenders when about a hundred earthen vessels stocked with water, stored in a portico, were destroyed in the bombardment. Thus, after days of thirst and continuous bombardment, the Nepalese were forced to evacuate the fort on November 30. Balbhadra refused to surrender and, with about 70 of his surviving men, he was able to fight his way through the besieging force for the hills. General Gillespie had been killed and Balbhadra and his 600 men had held the might of the British and their Indian troops for a month.

In Nepal, the story of the battle at Nalapani has gained legendary status and has become an important part of the nation's historical narrative, while Balbhadra himself has become one of the national heroes of Nepal. In the years following of the battle, the British constructed a small obelisk that was dedicated with the inscription "Our brave adversary Bul Buddur and his gallant men". (Note: The inscription uses an alternate spelling of Bal Bhadra's name, "Bul Buddur".)Full inscription is as follows:

This is inscribed as a tribute of respect to our gallant adversary Bulbudder and his brave Goorkhas who were afterwards, while in the service of Runjitsingh, shot dead by the Afghan artillery to the last man.

== Kunwar family tree ==
Ahirama Kunwar
Ram Krishna Kunwar	Jaya Krishna Kunwar	Amar Singh Kunwar
Ranajit Kunwar	Chandrabir Kunwar
Bal Narsingh Kunwar	Balaram Kunwar	Rewant Kunwar	Bira Bhadra Kunwar	Balbhadra Kunwar	Chetan Singh Kamar

== Gallery ==
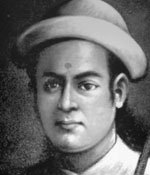
Balabhadra Kunwar, a Kunwar dynast on Jayakrishna branch

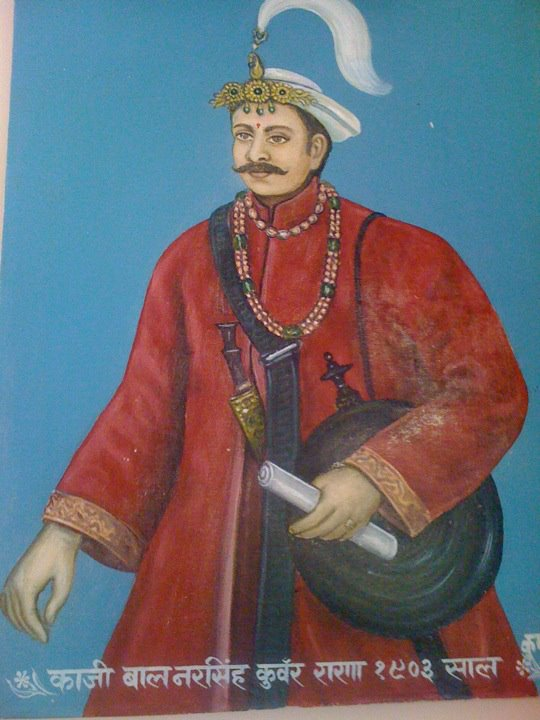
Bal Narsingh Kunwar, a Kunwar dynast on Ramkrishna branch

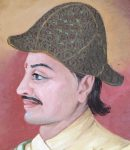
Bam Bahadur Kunwar, son of Bal Narsingh, later Prime Minister of Nepal

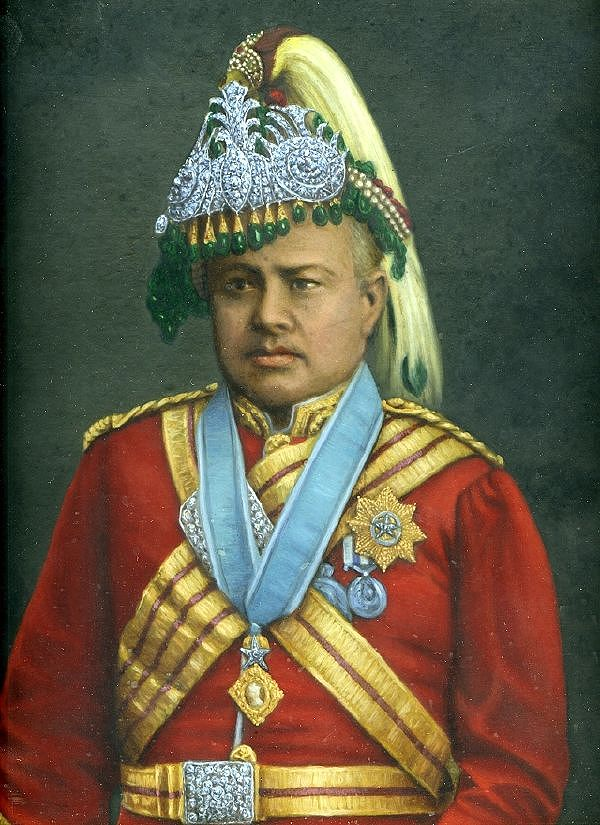
Ranodip Singh Kunwar, son of Bal Narsingh, later Prime Minister of Nepal and Maharaja of Lamjung and Kaski

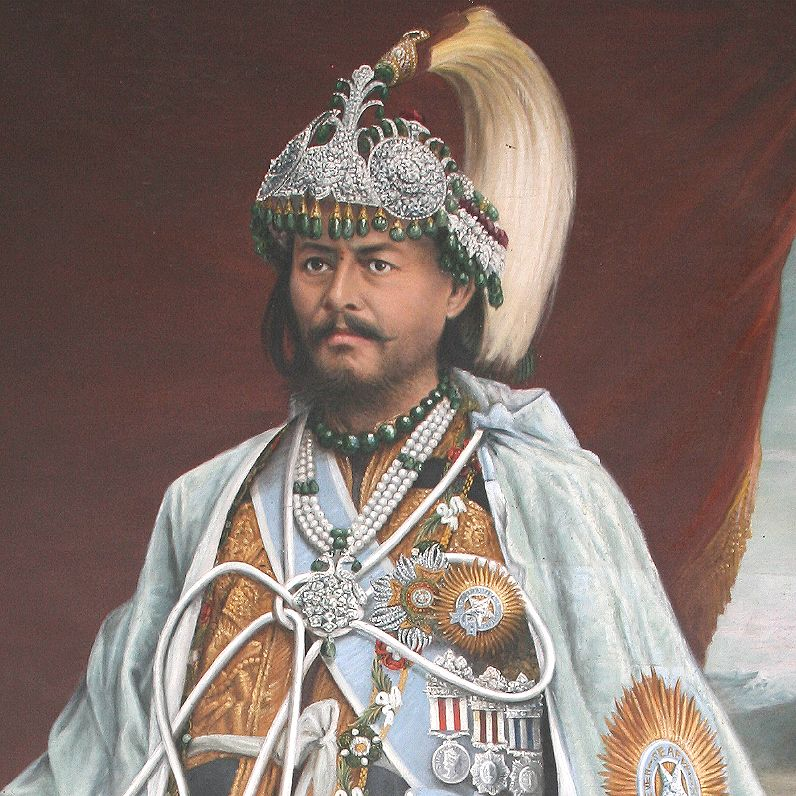
Bir Narsingh Kunwar, a Kunwar dynast on Ramkrishna branch

== Bibliography ==
- Acharya, Baburam (January 1, 1971) [1950], "King Girban's Letter To Kaji Ranjor Thapa" (PDF), Regmi Research Series, 3 (1): 3–5, ISSN 0034-348X
- Acharya, Baburam (May 1, 1972) [1950], "King Prithvi Narayan Shah's Letters To Ramkrishna Kunwar Rana" (PDF), Regmi Research Series, 4 (5): 94–96
- Acharya, Baburam (2013). The Bloodstained Throne: Struggles for Power in Nepal (1775-1914). New Delhi: Penguin Books. ISBN 978-0-143-41637-1.
- Acharya, Baburam (2012), Acharya, Shri Krishna (ed.), Janaral Bhimsen Thapa: Yinko Utthan Tatha Pattan (in Nepali), Kathmandu: Education Book House, ISBN 9789937241748
- Acharya, Baburam (December 1, 1975) [1966], "Some Confusions" (PDF), Regmi Research Series, 7 (12), Regmi Research Centre: 224–232
- Adhikari, Krishna Kant (1984), Nepal Under Jang Bahadur, 1846-1877, vol. 1, Nepal: Buku
- Anon (1816). "An Account of the War in Nepal; Contained in a Letter from an Officer on the Staff of the Bengal Army". Asiatic Journal and Monthly Miscellany. 1: 425–429. OCLC 1514448.
- Anon (1822). Military Sketches of the Goorka War in India: In the Years 1814, 1815, 1816. London: Woodbridge (Printed by J. Loder for R. Hunter). OCLC 470785427.
- Bolt, James Langstone (1967), Gurkhas, Weidenfeld & Nicolson
- Dabaral, Shiva Prasad ‘’Charan’’ (April 1987b), "From the Yamuna to the Sutlej" (PDF), Regmi Research Series, 19 (4): 50–54
- Farewell, Byron (1984). The Gurkhas. London: W.W. Norton & Company. ISBN 9780393017731. ASIN 0713914661.
- Fraser, James Baillie (1820). Journal of a Tour Through Part of the Snowy Range of the Himālā Mountains, and to the Sources of the Rivers Jumna and Ganges. London: Rodwell and Martin. OCLC 69385527.
- Hamal, Lakshman B. (1995). Military history of Nepal. Sharda Pustak Mandir. p. 125. OCLC 32779233.
- Joshi, Bhuwan Lal; Rose, Leo E. (1966). Democratic Innovations in Nepal: Case Study of Political Acculturation. Berkeley: University of California Press. ISBN 978-0520006225.
- Nepal, Gyanmani (2007), Nepal ko Mahabharat (in Nepali) (3rd ed.), Kathmandu: Sajha, p. 314, ISBN 9789993325857
- Onta, Pratyoush (January 1996). "Ambivalence Denied: The Making of Rastriya Itihas in Panchayat Era Textbooks" (PDF). Contributions to Nepalese Studies. 23 (1): 213–254. OCLC 60628049.
- Pant, Mahesh Raj (October 1, 1978a). "Nepal's Defeat in the Nepal-British War" (PDF). Regmi Research Series. 10 (10): 150–159. ISSN 0034-348X.
- Pant, Mahesh Raj (December 1, 1978b). "The Battle of Nalapani" (PDF). Regmi Research Series. 10 (12): 187–194. ISSN 0034-348X.
- Pant, Mahesh Raj (January 1, 1979). "More Documents on the Battle of Nalapani" (PDF). Regmi Research Series. 11 (1): 11, 23. ISSN 0034-348X.
- Prinsep, Henry Thoby (1825). History of the Political and Military Transactions in India During the Administration of the Marquess of Hastings, 1813–1823. Vol. 1. London: Kingsbury, Parbury & Allen. OCLC 152785969.
- Pradhan, Kumar L. (2012), Thapa Politics in Nepal: With Special Reference to Bhim Sen Thapa, 1806–1839, New Delhi: Concept Publishing Company, p. 278, ISBN 9788180698132
- Regmi, Mahesh Chandra, ed. (December 1, 1975a), "Miscellaneous Documents on Bheri-Mahakali Region" (PDF), Regmi Research Series, 7 (12), Regmi Research Centre: 221–223
- Regmi, Mahesh Chandra (May 1, 1975b), "Preliminary Notes on the Nature of Rana Law and Government" (PDF), Regmi Research Series, 7 (5): 88–97
- Regmi, Mahesh Chandra, ed. (November 1, 1978), "Miscellaneous Documents of 1887 Vikrama" (PDF), Regmi Research Series, 10 (11): 173–176
- Regmi, Mahesh Chandra (September–October 1987b), "Gorkhali Rule in Garhwal" (PDF), Regmi Research Series, 19 (9–10): 143–150
- Regmi, Mahesh Chandra (1987), Regmi Research Series, vol. 19, Regmi Research Centre
- Richard Burghart (1984). "The Formation of the Concept of Nation-State in Nepal". The Journal of Asian Studies. 44 (1): 101–125. doi:10.2307/2056748. JSTOR 2056748. S2CID 154584368.
- Sharma Baral, Leelanatheshwar (1964), Life and Writings of Prithvinarayan Shah (PDF), University of London
- Stiller, Ludwig F. (1981), Letters from Kathmandu: The Kot Massacre, Research Centre for Nepal and Asian Studies, Tribhuvan University, Kirtipur
- Vaidya, Tulsi Ram (1993), Prithvinaryan Shah, the founder of Nepal, Anmol Publications, ISBN 9788170417019
- Whelpton, John (1991). Kings, soldiers, and priests: Nepalese politics and the rise of Jang Bahadur Rana, 1830-1857. Manohar Publications. p. 254. ISBN 9788185425641.
- Wright, Daniel (1877), History of Nepal, Cambridge University Press
