= Krishna Bahadur Kunwar Rana =

Nepalese politician, administrator, military general

Krishna Bahadur Kunwar

Acting Prime Minister of Nepal
- In office 25 May 1857 – 28 June 1857
- Preceded by: Bam Bahadur Kunwar
- Succeeded by: Ranodip Singh Kunwar

Commander-In-Chief of the Nepalese Army
- In office 1857–1862

Personal details
- Born: 1823
- Died: August 9, 1863 (aged 39–40)
- Relatives: Jung Bahadur Rana (brother); Lalit Rajeshwori Rajya; Lakshmi Devi; Tara Rajya; Laxmi Devi; Ranajit Kunwar (grand father); Ram Krishna Kunwar (great grand father)

Krishna Bahadur Kunwar, after 1848 CE known as Krishna Bahadur Kunwar Rana (Nepali: कृष्ण बहादुर कुँवर राणा), was a Nepalese politician, administrator, military general and minister of state. He served as the acting Prime Minister of Nepal upon the demise of his elder brother Bam Bahadur Kunwar from 25 May 1857 to 28 June 1857. He also served as the Commander-In-Chief of the Nepalese Army between 1857 and 1862.

== Personal life ==
He was born as son of Bal Narsingh Kunwar and Ganesh Kumari Thapa, daughter of Kaji Nain Singh Thapa of the politically affluent Thapa family. He was the younger brother of Jung Bahadur Kunwar Rana and Bam Bahadur Kunwar as well as the elder brother of Ranodip Singh Kunwar and Dhir Shamsher Kunwar Rana. Kunwars came to political power being close relatives of the same Thapa family.

== Career ==
On the night of 14 September 1846, Jung Bahadur Kunwar and his brothers massacred around 29 nobles in the Kot Massacre. Khadga Vikram Shah attempted to attack Krishna Bahadur Kunwar and was killed subsequently by Krishna's youngest brother Dhir Shamsher Kunwar. In the aftermath of the massacre, Jung Bahadur appointed his brothers and nephews to the highest ranks of the government.

Krishna Bahadur Kunwar served as the governor of Palpa between 1846 and 1849. He served as the Chief Administrator of Morang, Saptari, Parsa, Bara, Rautahat and Sarlahi districts in the year 1849. He served as the acting Prime Minister of Nepal upon the demise of his elder brother Bam Bahadur Kunwar from 25 May 1857 to 28 June 1857. He also served as the Commander-In-Chief of the Nepalese Army between 1857 and 1862.

He had no sons of his own so he adopted Dev Shamsher (later Shree 3 Maharaja Dev Shumsher Jung Bahadur Rana), the fifth son of his youngest brother Dhir Shamsher.

== Death ==
He died on 9 August 1863.

== Books ==
=== Bibliography ===
- Acharya, Baburam (2013). The Bloodstained Throne: Struggles for Power in Nepal (1775–1914). New Delhi: Penguin Books Ltd. ISBN 978-0-14-341637-1.
- Acharya, Baburam (2012), Acharya, Shri Krishna (ed.), Janaral Bhimsen Thapa : Yinko Utthan Tatha Pattan (in Nepali), Kathmandu: Education Book House, p. 228, ISBN 9789937241748
- Adhikari, Krishna Kant (1984), Nepal Under Jang Bahadur, 1846–1877, vol. 1, Nepal: Buku, ISBN 9788180698132
- Hamal, Lakshman B. (1995). Military history of Nepal. Sharda Pustak Mandir. p. 125. OCLC 32779233.
- Joshi, Bhuwan Lal; Rose, Leo E. (1966). Democratic Innovations in Nepal: Case Study of Political Acculturation. Berkeley: University of California Press. ISBN 978-0-520-00622-5.
- Nepal, Gyanmani (2007), Nepal ko Mahabharat (in Nepali) (3rd ed.), Kathmandu: Sajha, p. 314, ISBN 9789993325857
- Pradhan, Kumar L. (2012), Thapa Politics in Nepal: With Special Reference to Bhim Sen Thapa, 1806–1839, New Delhi: Concept Publishing Company, p. 278, ISBN 9788180698132
- Prasad, Ishwari (1 January 1996). The Life and Times of Maharaja Juddha Shumsher Jung Bahadur Rana of Nepal. APH Publishing. ISBN 978-81-7024-756-2.
- Regmi, Mahesh Chandra (May 1, 1975), "Preliminary Notes on the Nature of Rana Law and Government" (PDF), Regmi Research Series, 7 (5): 88–97
- Stiller, Ludwig F. (1981), Letters from Kathmandu: The Kot Massacre, Research Centre for Nepal and Asian Studies, Tribhuvan University, Kirtipur
- Vaidya, Tulsi Ram (1993), Prithvinaryan Shah, the founder of Nepal, Anmol Publications, ISBN 9788170417019
- Whelpton, John (1991). Kings, soldiers, and priests: Nepalese politics and the rise of Jang Bahadur Rana, 1830–1857. Manohar Publications. p. 254. ISBN 9788185425641.
- Wright, Daniel (1877), History of Nepal, Cambridge University Press
