= Jagat Shumsher Rana =

- जगत शमशेर राणा
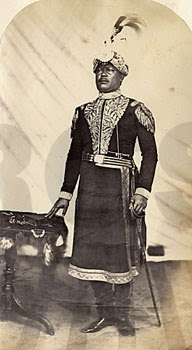
- Jagat Shumsher Rana

Commander-In-Chief of the Nepalese Army
- In office 27 February 1877 – 11 May 1879
- Monarch: Prithvi Bir Bikram Shah
- Prime Minister: Ranodip Singh Kunwar
- Preceded by: Ranodip Singh Kunwar
- Succeeded by: Dhir Shamsher Rana

Personal details
- Born: 1826 Kingdom of Nepal
- Died: 11 May 1879 (aged 52–53) Nepal
- Relations: Rana dynasty
- Parents: Bal Narsingh Kunwar (father); Ganesh Kumari (mother)

Jagat Shumsher Rana (Nepali: जगत शमशेर राणा) was the Commander-In-Chief of the Nepalese Army from 27 February 1877 to 11 May 1879.

Rana was born in 1826 to Bal Narsingh Kunwar and Ganesh Kumari as the seventh son. He was removed from the rolls of succession after plotting against Ranodip Singh Kunwar.

Rana was succeeded by Dhir Shamsher Rana in 1879.

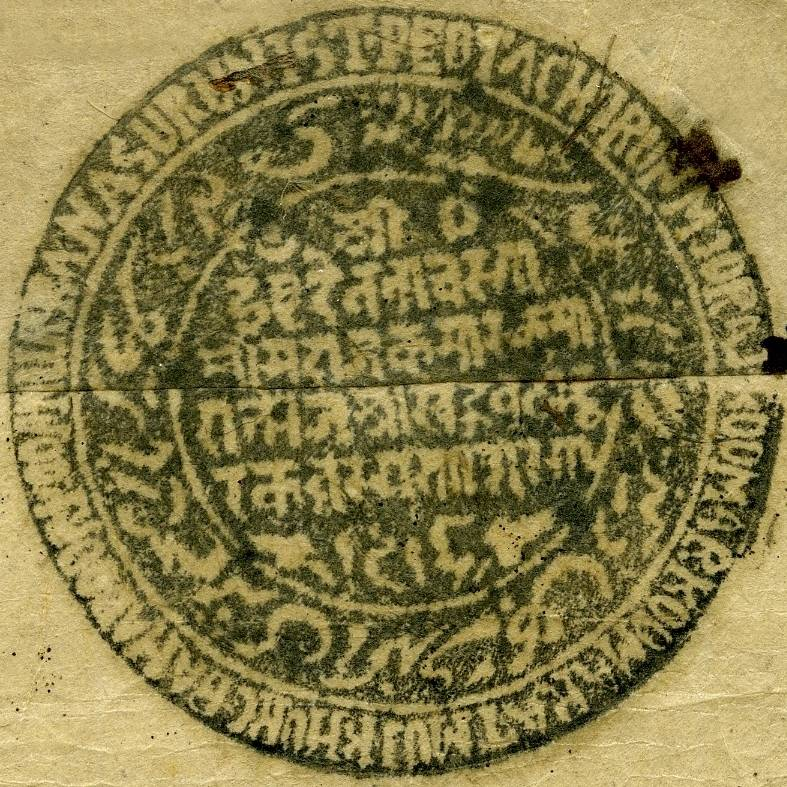
Seal of Jagat Shumsher Rana
