= Bal Narsingh Kunwar =

Nepalese Kaji and governor of Jumla (1783–1842)

Kaji Bal Narsingh Kunwar
- काजी बालनरसिंह कुँवर
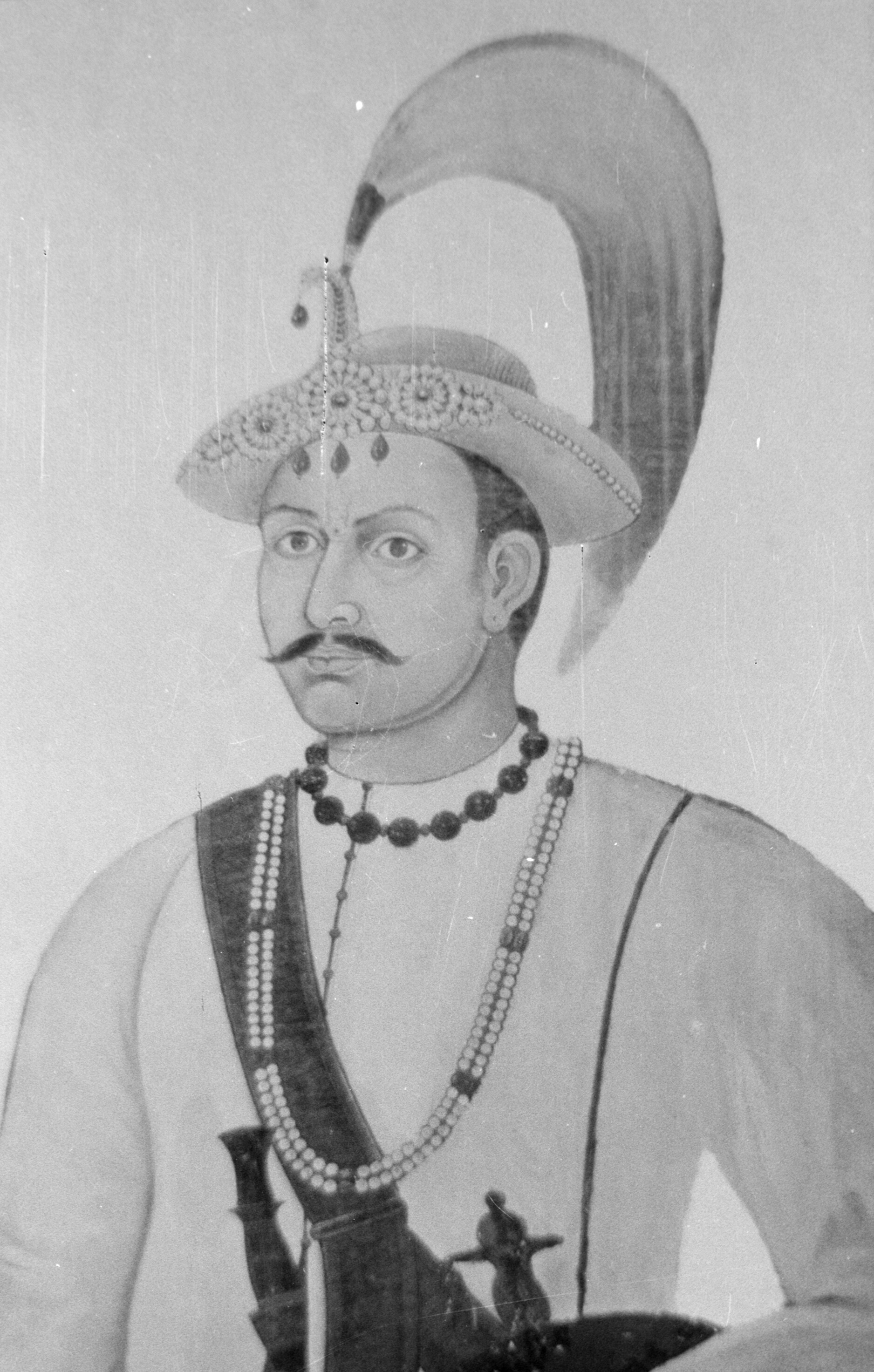
- Bal Narsingh Kunwar's painting (referred posthumously in the painting as Bal Narsingh Kunwar Rana)

Governor of Dhankuta
- In office 1828-1832

Governor of Dadeldhura
- In office 1833-1835

Governor of Jumla
- In office 1835-1837

Personal details
- Born: 2 February 1783 CE Borlang, Gorkha
- Died: 24 December 1841 CE (aged 58) Kathmandu, Nepal
- Spouse(s): Rakshya Kumari; Ganesh Kumari Thapa (Thapa dynasty) (d.1758)
- Relations: Ram Krishna Kunwar (grandfather); Nain Singh Thapa (father-in-law); Balbhadra Kunwar (cousin); Mathabar Singh Thapa (brother-in-law); Queen Tripurasundari of Nepal (sister-in-law)
- Children: Bhakta Bir Kunwar; Jung Bahadur Kunwar Rana; Bam Bahadur Kunwar; Badri Narsingh Kunwar; Krishna Bahadur Kunwar; Jaya Bahadur Kunwar; Ranodip Singh Kunwar; Jagat Shamsher Kunwar Rana; Dhir Shamsher Kunwar Rana
- Parent: Ranajit Kunwar (father)

Bal Narsingh Kunwar or Balanarsingh Kanwar (Nepali: बालनरसिंह कुँवर; 2 February 1783 - 24 December 1841) posthumously referred to as Bal Narsingh Kunwar Rana was a Kaji, military officer and governor in the Kingdom of Nepal.

He was born to Kaji Ranajit Kunwar of the Chhetri Kunwar family of Gorkha. He was the father of Jung Bahadur Rana, founder of the Rana dynasty. Bal Narsingh married Ganesh Kumari, daughter of Thapa Kaji Nain Singh Thapa and was related to the Pandes through his mother-in-law Rana Kumari Pande, daughter of Mulkaji Ranajit Pande. He became a Kaji (minister of state) after he killed Sher Bahadur Shah, the assassin of King Rana Bahadur Shah. He served as governor of Dhankuta, Dadeldhura and Jumla.

== Early life ==
He was born on 2 February 1783 to Governor of Jumla, Kaji Ranajit Kunwar, the only son of Sardar Ram Krishna Kunwar, a prominent general of King Prithvi Narayan Shah. He was second cousin to Captain Balbhadra Kunwar. He travelled to Banaras with his ally Bhimsen Thapa, Dalbhanjan Pande, Ranganath Poudyal, Chautariya Balbhadra Shah, when King Rana Bahadur Shah as Swami Maharaja set out to leave the country.

== Bhandarkhal Night ==
On the night of 25 April 1806, King Rana Bahadur Shah held a courtier meeting at Kazi Tribhuvan Khawas's house during which he taunted and threatened to execute his half brother Chautariya Sher Bahadur. Bal Narsingh cut down the murderer Sher Bahadur when the latter drew a sword in desperation at around 10 pm and killed the King. For this, he was awarded the hereditary post of Kaji by Bhimsen Thapa.

== Life as Governor ==
He worked as Governor of Dhankuta (1828-1832), Governor of Dadeldhura (1833-1835) and Governor of Jumla (1835-1837).
