= Ishwari Prasad =

Indian historian (1888–1986)

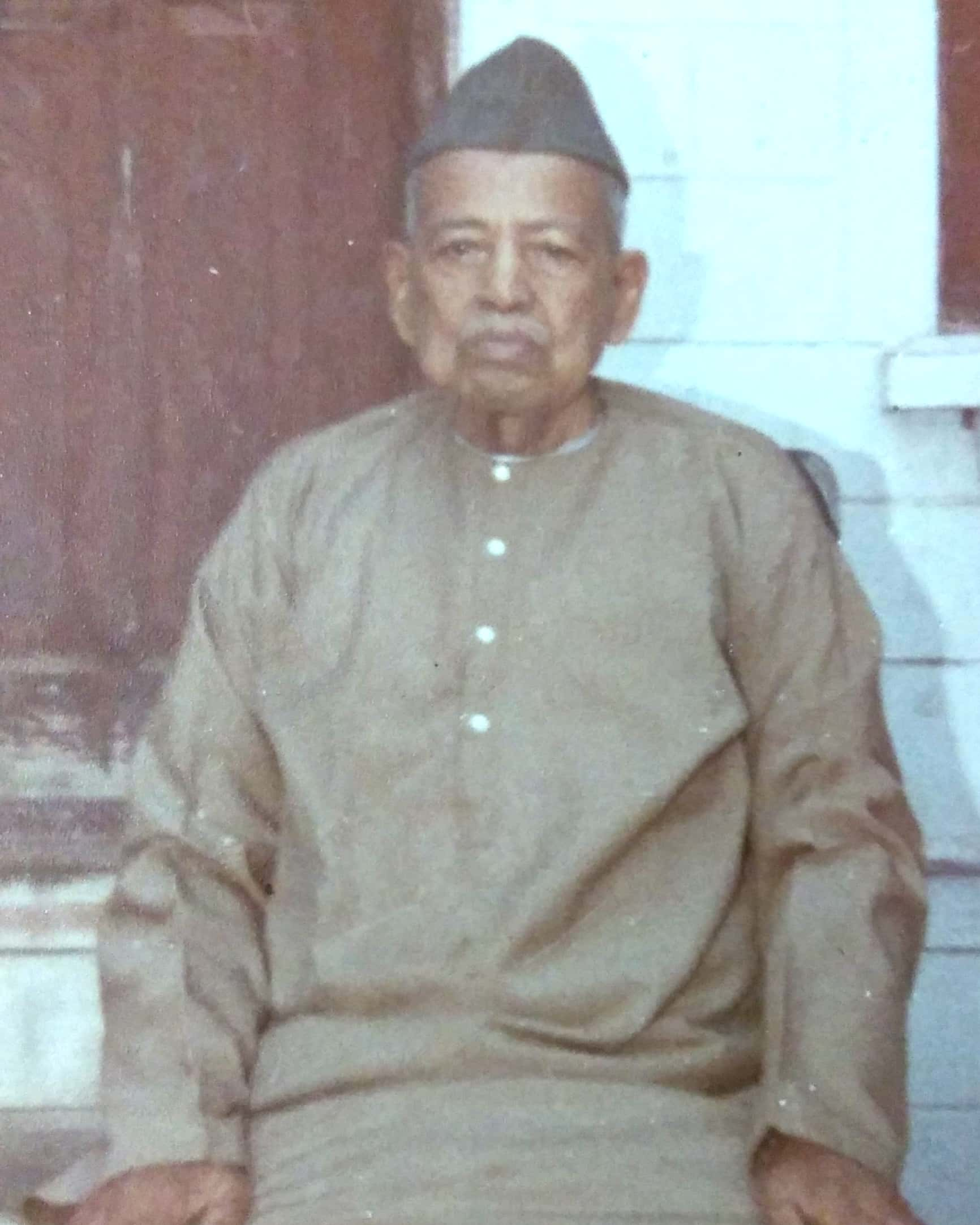
Ishwari Prasad at his residence in Agra (Dec 1979)

Iswari Prasad Upadhyaya (1888–1986) was an Indian historian. He was an alumnus of Aligarh Muslim University, and first graduate of the university. He dealt mainly with the Muslim rulers and governments of India, especially with the Mughal and Tughluq dynasties. He did extensive work on rulers such as Muhammad bin Tughluq, the Sultan of Delhi, Humayun, and Aurangzeb.

== Early life and education ==
He was born in Agra, Uttar Pradesh in a village called Kurra Chittarpur. His father Lt. Shobharam Upadhyay was head-master in a school. His father's untimely death left a very young Ishwari Prasad, a student of class 12th to look after his younger siblings.

He continued his education and earned his livelihood by giving tuitions. He was a student of Agra College and while he was studying in M.A., he was taking B.A. classes. During one of his lectures Prof. Rushbrook Williams was present & he believed that Dr. Ishwari Prasad possessed unusual qualifications as a Historian. He invited him to teach at the University of Allahabad.

== Career ==
He was elected Member of Legislative Council from the graduate constituency for 3 terms continuously. Contributions to historical research and scholarship.In Uttar Pradesh Vidhan Parishad, he along with another member Nirmal Chandra Chaturvedi made relentless efforts for quality higher education.The two were the most prominent members of the University Grants Committee of the State.

He was conferred Padma Bhushan in 1984 by the President of India for his contributions to History.

== Works ==
- History of medieval India from 647 AD to the Mughal conquest. Allahabad : The Indian press, ltd., 1925
- The Mughal Empire. Allahabad: Chugh Publications, 1974
- A Short History of Muslim Rule in India, from the Conquest of Islam to the Death of Aurangzeb: From the Advent of Islam to the Death of Aurangzeb. Allahabad: The Indian press, Ltd., 1965
- A History of the Qaraunah Turks in India. Allahabad: The Indian press, ltd., 1936
- The life and times of Humayun. Bombay [ua] : Orient Longmans, 1956
- India in the eighteenth century. Allahabad: Chugh Publications, 1973
- Hindu - Muslim problems. Allahabad: Chugh Publications, 1974
- L'Inde du 7e au 16e siècle. Traduit sur la 2e edition par H. de Saugy. Paris : de Boccard, 1930 (Histoire du monde; 8,1)
- The life and times of Maharaja Juddha Shumsher Jung Bahadur Rana of Nepal. New Delhi : Ashish Pub. House, 1975
- History of mediaeval India. Allahabad: The Indian press, ltd., 1976
- History of Indian Timurids. 1 ed. Allahabad : The Indian press, ltd., 1995
- A New History of India. Allahabad : The Indian press, ltd., 1940
