= Bam Bahadur Kunwar =

Former prime minister of Nepal

General, Madhara Jang Kumara Kumarangtamaya Sri Bam Bahadur Rana Ranaji
- जनरल बम बहादुर राणा
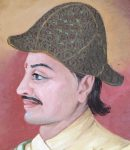
- Bam Bahadur Rana

Prime Minister of Nepal
- In office 15 January 1850 - 6 Feb 1851; 1 August 1856 - 25 May 1857
- Monarch: King Surendra of Nepal
- Preceded by: Jung Bahadur Rana
- Succeeded by: Krishna Bahadur Rana(acting PM)

Personal details
- Born: Bam Bahadur Kunwar; 20 June 1818
- Died: 25 May 1857 (aged 38) Kathmandu, Nepal
- Cause of death: Tuberculosis
- Spouse(s): Lila Devi; Indra Kumari Devi; Badan Kumari Devi; Girvananda Kumari
- Children: Sons: Teg Bahadur Rana; Yakshya Bikram Rana; Bambir Bikram Rana; Daughter: Bhubaneshwori(eldest)
- Parent(s): Bal Narsingh Kunwar (father); Ganesh Kumari Thapa (mother)
- Relatives: Mathabarsingh Thapa (uncle); Jung Bahadur Rana (brother); Ranodip Singh Kunwar (brother); Dhir Shumsher Rana (brother)

Military service
- Allegiance: Nepal
- Battles/wars: Nepal-Tibet War (1855-1856)

Bam Bahadur Rana (1818–1857; Nepali: बम बहादुर राणा) was the 9th Prime Minister of Nepal. He was younger brother of Jung Bahadur Rana. His father, Kaji Bal Narsingh Kunwar, was the bodyguard of King Rana Bahadur Shah and the governor of Dhankuta (1828–1832), Dadeldhura (1833–1835) and Jumla (1835–1837). His mother, Ganesh Kumari, was the daughter of Kaji Nain Singh Thapa, the brother of Mukhtiyar Bhimsen Thapa from the prominent Thapa dynasty. He was first in line to be the Prime Minister of Nepal after Jung Bahadur Rana but due to his premature death at 39 years of age the roll of succession passed to Ranodip Singh.

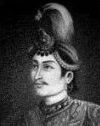
General Bam Bahadur Rana

He died on 25 May 1857 by tuberculosis. His wife was prevented from committing sati by Jung Bahadur Rana. His younger brother Ranodip Singh performed the formal 13-days mourning ritual. He left behind three minor sons, Teg 9, Yakshya 7, Bambir 5 years of age and a married daughter Bhubaneshwori. He was only a year younger than Jung Bahadur Rana and was the loyalest brother. His first son, Teg Bahadur Rana, was sent from an early age to Pokhara as Badahakim (Administrator of the Province). His second son, Yakshya Bikram Rana, managed peace terms with his cousin Bir Shumsher Jung Bahadur Rana and his family were allowed to live in peace in Nepal after Shumshers' 1885 Nepal coup d'état. His youngest son, Bambir Bikram Rana, was sent into exile and imprisoned in south India after Shumshers' 1885 Nepal coup d'état.

== Works ==
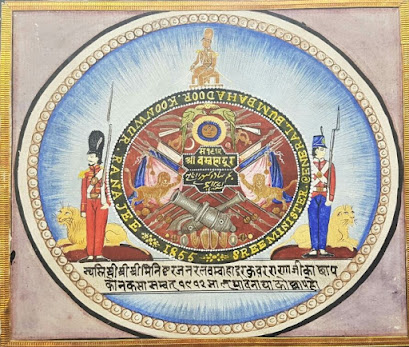
Insignia of the Prime Minister Bam Bahadur Rana

He was a Nepal's envoy to the British Raj during the tenure of the then Prime Minister Mathbar Singh Thapa. He also worked as the in-charge of Treasury Department of Nepal. He played a prominent role during the Kot massacre that paved the foundation for 104-years Rana regime. After Kot Parva, he was promoted from Kaji to General. He was the interim Prime Minister of Nepal during the Visit of Jung Bahadur Rana to Europe(1850–1851). During this time, he built the Teen Dewal Temple of Teku, the adjoining complex and the gardens from his own resources. He spoiled the conspiracy of Badri Narsingh Rana to assassinate Jung Bahadur Rana by confiding him. He was a war hero during the Nepal–Tibet War (1855–1856) where he led the 2nd expeditionary forces of Nepal from Kerung border. After the war victory, he arrived Kathmandu on July 31, 1856. Jung Bahadur Rana forced King Surendra Bikram Shah to make the official decree and he was appointed the Prime Minister of Nepal. He made an extensive plan to survey the Terai lands of Nepal and assess new revenue standards as a way to balance the national budget. He died after 10 months by tuberculosis. He was an educated statesman who served the Kingdom of Nepal as an envoy, minister, army chief, army general, Commander-in-Chief and the Prime Minister.

== Ancestry ==
Ancestors of Bam Bahadur Kunwar

16. Ahirama Kunwar
8. Ram Krishna Kunwar
4. Ranajit Kunwar
2. Bal Narsingh Kunwar
1. Bam Bahadur Rana
24. Bir Bhadra Thapa
12. Amar Singh Thapa (sanukaji)
6. Nain Singh Thapa
13. Satyarupa Maya
3. Ganesh Kumari Thapa
28. Tularam Pande
14. Ranajit Pande
7. Rana Kumari Pande
