= John Whelpton =

John Francis Whelpton (born 24 March 1950) is a historian and linguist and a specialist in the history of Nepal about which he has written a number of books.

== Selected publications ==
- Jang Bahadur in Europe: The First Nepalese Mission to the West. Sahayogi Press, Kathmandu, 1983.
- Nepal. Clio Press, Santa Barbara, 1990.
- Nepal: Bibliography. 1990. (World bibliographical series).
- Kings, Soldiers, and Priests: Nepalese Politics and the Rise of Jang Bahadur Rana, 1830-1857, Manohar Publications, New Delhi, 1991. ISBN 8185425647.
- Nationalism and Ethnicity in a Hindu State: The Politics of Culture in Contemporary Nepal. 1996. (Studies in Anthropology and History) (With David N. Gellner).
- Nationalism and Ethnicity in a Hindu Kingdom: The Politics of Culture in Contemporary Nepal. Harwood Academic Publishers, Amsterdam, 1997. (Editor).
- People, Politics & Ideology: Democracy and Social Change in Nepal. Mandala Book Point, Kathmandu, 1999.
- A History of Nepal. University of Cambridge Press, Cambridge, 2005. ISBN 0521804701.
- Celebrating 50 Years of VSO in Nepal. 2014. (With Anne Seymour).
- The Other Side of the Hill: Learning Cantonese as a Second Language in Hong Kong. 2017.
