= Ram Krishna Kunwar =

Nepalese military commander

Sardar Ram Krishna Kunwar
- सरदार रामकृष्ण कुँवर
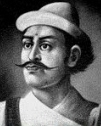
- Portrait of Sardar Ram Krishna Kunwar

Sardar of Gorkha
- In office TBD–TBD
- Preceded by: TBD
- Succeeded by: TBD

Personal details
- Born: circa 1728 A.D.
- Children: Ranajit Kunwar (only son)
- Parent: Ahirama Kunwar (father)
- Relatives: Bal Narsingh Kunwar (grandson); Balbhadra Kunwar (grand-nephew); Jang Bahadur Rana (great-grandson)

Military service
- Allegiance: Nepal
- Rank: Sardar
- Battles/wars: Battles of Unification of Nepal

Ram Krishna Kunwar or Ramakrishna Kunwar (Nepali: रामकृष्ण कुँवर; IAST: Rāmakr̥ṣṇa kum̐vara) was a military commander (Sardar) of Gorkha Kingdom during the Unification of Nepal at the reign of King Prithvi Narayan Shah. He was born circa 1728 AD to Ashiram Kunwar in the Kunwar family. His descendants went on to found the Rana dynasty of Nepal. He was a successful general in King Prithvi Narayan Shah's unification campaign of Nepal. He defeated British forces at Hariharpur Gadhi on 25 August 1767. He died in the Mechi Campaign in 1771 A.D.

== Family ==
He was born to Ahiram Kunwar. He had only a son named Ranajit Kunwar and three grandsons; Bal Narsingh Kunwar, Balram Kunwar and Rewant Kunwar.

== Career ==
King Prithvi Narayan sent Kaji Vamsharaj Pande, Naahar Singh Basnyat, Jeeva Shah, Ram Krishna Kunwar and others to defeat the forces of Gurgin Khan at Makwanpur. Ram Krishna was ordered by the King to organize the army at Makwanpur under his control. In a letter to Ramkrishna, King Prithvi Narayan Shah was unhappy at the death of Kaji Kalu Pande and thought it was impossible to conquer Kathmandu Valley after the death of Kalu Pande. After the annexation of Kathmandu Valley, King Prithvi Narayan Shah praised in his letter about valour and wisdom shown by Ramkrishna in annexation of Kathmandu, Lalitpur and Bhaktapur (i.e. Nepal valley at the time) on 1768-69 A.D. The letter sent by King Prithvi Narayan Shah to Ramkrishna Kunwar on Ashwin Badi 5 of unknown Vikram Year (Note: Mahesh Chandra Regmi explains that this letter was sent on 1829 Vikram Samvat (1772 A.D.) since Ramkrishna invaded Kirant region on 13th Bhadra 1829 Vikram Samvat.) has been mentioned by historian Baburam Acharya

When Kalu Pande was killed in Kirtipur, I had felt disheartened, thinking that I had not been able to conquer the three towns of Nepal. This has now been accomplished through the force of your wisdom and your sword. Were I to give you anything for this achievement, not even half of this Kingdom would be sufficient. I hereby grant you Simbhu and the adjoining areas, as well as Dhulikhel to be enjoyed from generation to generation. I felt very grieved when your younger brother was killed in Timal. I now depend upon you to invade the Kirat region.

— King Prithvi Narayan Shah's Letters to Ramakrishna Kunwar by Baburam Acharya

The Gorkhali monarch also expresses condolence in that letter over the death of one of the brothers of Ram Krishna in the battle of Timal. Another index letter sent by King Rana Bahadur Shah to Jaya Krishna Kunwar in 1843 Vikram Samvat (i.e. 1786 A.D.) confirms that Jaya Krishna did not die in the battle of Timal which could point to the death of his youngest brother Amar Singh Kunwar in the battle of Timal. When Ram Krishna was conferred the confiscated properties (including residence) of former Kathmandu King Jaya Prakash Malla, he donated the properties to "Guthi" for supplying foods to pilgrims in Shivaratri festival. King Prithvi Narayan Shah had deployed Sardar Ram Krishna to the invasion of Kirant regional areas comprising; Pallo Kirant (Limbuwan), Wallo Kirant and Majh Kirant (Khambuwan). In 13th of Bhadra 1829 Vikram Samvat (i.e. 29 August 1772), Ram Krishna crossed Dudhkoshi river to invade King Karna Sen of. Majh Kirant (Khambuwan) and Saptari region with fellow commander Abhiman Singh Basnyat. He crossed Arun River to reach Chainpur(Limbuwan). Later, he achieved victory over Kirant region. King Prithvi Narayan Shah bestowed 22 pairs of Shirpau (special headgear) in appreciation to Ram Krishna Kunwar after his victory over the Kirant region. Genealogist Daniel Wright contends that Ram Krishna died at Pyuthan at the age of 59.

== Rana dynasty ==
His descendants later went on to become Rana dynasty of Nepal.

== See also ==
- Bir Bhadra Thapa
- Shivaram Singh Basnyat

== Books ==
- Acharya, Baburam (1 May 1972) [1950]. "King Prithvi Narayan Shah's Letters to Ramakrishna Kunwar Rana" (PDF). Regmi Research Series. 04 (5). Kathmandu: –159.
- Hamal, Lakshman B. (1995). Military history of Nepal. Sharda Pustak Mandir. p. 125. OCLC 32779233.
- Pradhan, Kumar L. (2012), Thapa Politics in Nepal: With Special Reference to Bhim Sen Thapa, 1806–1839, New Delhi: Concept Publishing Company, p. 278, ISBN 9788180698132
- Regmi, Mahesh Chandra (1972). Regmi Research Series (PDF). Vol. 04. Regmi Research Centre.
- Regmi, Mahesh Chandra (1975), Regmi Research Series, vol. 7, Regmi Research Centre, archived from the original on 15 January 2023
- Vaidya, Tulsi Ram (1993), Prithvinaryan Shah, the founder of Nepal, Anmol Publications, ISBN 9788170417019
- Wright, Daniel (1877), History of Nepal, Cambridge University Press
