= Sanak Singh Khatri =

Commanding-Colonel Sanak Singh Khatri

Commanding-Colonel of the Shree Purano Gorakh Battalion
- Appointed by: Jung Bahadur Rana
- Monarch: Surendra

Personal details
- Relations: Jung Bahadur Rana (brother-in-law); Nanda Kumari Khatri (sister); Jagat Jung Rana (nephew); Jit Jung Rana (nephew)
- Parent: Parshuram Khatri (father)

Military service
- Allegiance: Kingdom of Nepal
- Branch/service: Nepalese Army
- Rank: Commanding-Colonel
- Unit: Shree Purano Gorakh
- Battles/wars: Battle of Alau (1847); Third Nepal–Tibet War (1855–1856); Indian Rebellion (1857)

Sanak Singh Khatri (Nepali: सनक सिंह खत्री), also known as Sanak Singh Tandon (Note: Nepali: सनक सिंह टण्डन, romanized: Sanak Singh Tandan, pronounced [/sənək sɪŋɡʱə ʈəɳɖən/]) was a 19th-century Nepalese military officer and political figure who served as commander of the Shree Purano Gorakh Battalion in the Nepalese Army. He was the brother-in-law of Jung Bahadur Rana and played a active role in the political rise and consolidation of power that established the Rana dynasty in the Kingdom of Nepal. Khatri was the only non-Rana to attain the rank of Commanding-Colonel in the Nepalese army.

== Family background ==
Sanak Singh Khatri came from a family with a strong history of state service. His grandfather, Sashidhar Khatri, was a trusted official of the Shah dynasty during the reign of King Rana Bahadur Shah. Sashidhar had two sons: Subedar Krishna Khatri and Captain Parshuram Khatri.

Sanak Singh was born to Parshuram Khatri. He was the eldest of four siblings, growing up with two younger brothers, Devi Singh Khatri and Indra Singh Khatri, and a sister, Nanda Kumari Khatri.

During a period of severe political and financial hardship for the Kunwar family, triggered by the death of Mukhtiyar Bhimsen Thapa, Sanak Singh's sister, Nanda Kumari, was married to Jung Bahadur Kunwar (who would later take the title "Rana"). With the financial backing from Khatris, Jung Bahadur was able to pay off his debts and later re-establish his footing in the royal court.

== Military career ==
As Jung Bahadur Rana's brother-in-law and closest confidant, Khatri was a principal figure in the establishment of the Rana regime. He provided crucial support to Jung Bahadur during the most volatile political events in 19th-century Kingdom of Nepal, taking an active part in both the Kot Massacre and the Bhandarkhal Massacre of 1846. Following these events, Khatri was promoted to the military rank of Captain in the Shree Purano Gorakh Battalion of the Nepalese Army.

=== Battle of Alau ===
In 1847, Captain Khatri led the Nepalese army to victory against the forces of the exiled King Rajendra Bikram Shah in the Battle of Alau, a decisive clash that solidified Jung Bahadur's absolute power in the Kingdom of Nepal.

=== Third Nepal–Tibet War ===
During the Third Nepal–Tibet War (1855–1856), Khatri served as a military commander on the northern Himalayan front under Jung Bahadur Rana. He led Nepalese troops into strategic border territories, actively participating in high-altitude operations around the Dzongka front to reinforce critical positions against Tibetan forces. His command during the conflict helped secure Nepal's military footing, contributing to the peace negotiations that ultimately resulted in the Treaty of Thapathali.

=== Indian Rebellion of 1857 ===
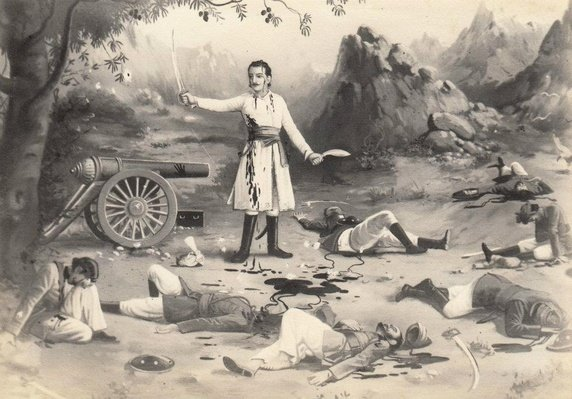
Colonel Bahadur Gambhir Singh Rayamajhi during the Indian Rebellion of 1857.

Two years later, the Kingdom of Nepal sent its victorious Gurkha troops under the command of Captain Khatri and Colonel Gambhir Singh Rayamajhi to assist the East India Company in suppressing the Indian Rebellion of 1857. Khatri's loyalty, military service, and his role in securing the Rana regime earned him successive promotions through the ranks, from Captain to Commanding-Colonel of the Shree Purano Gorakh Battalion.

== Personal life and legacy ==
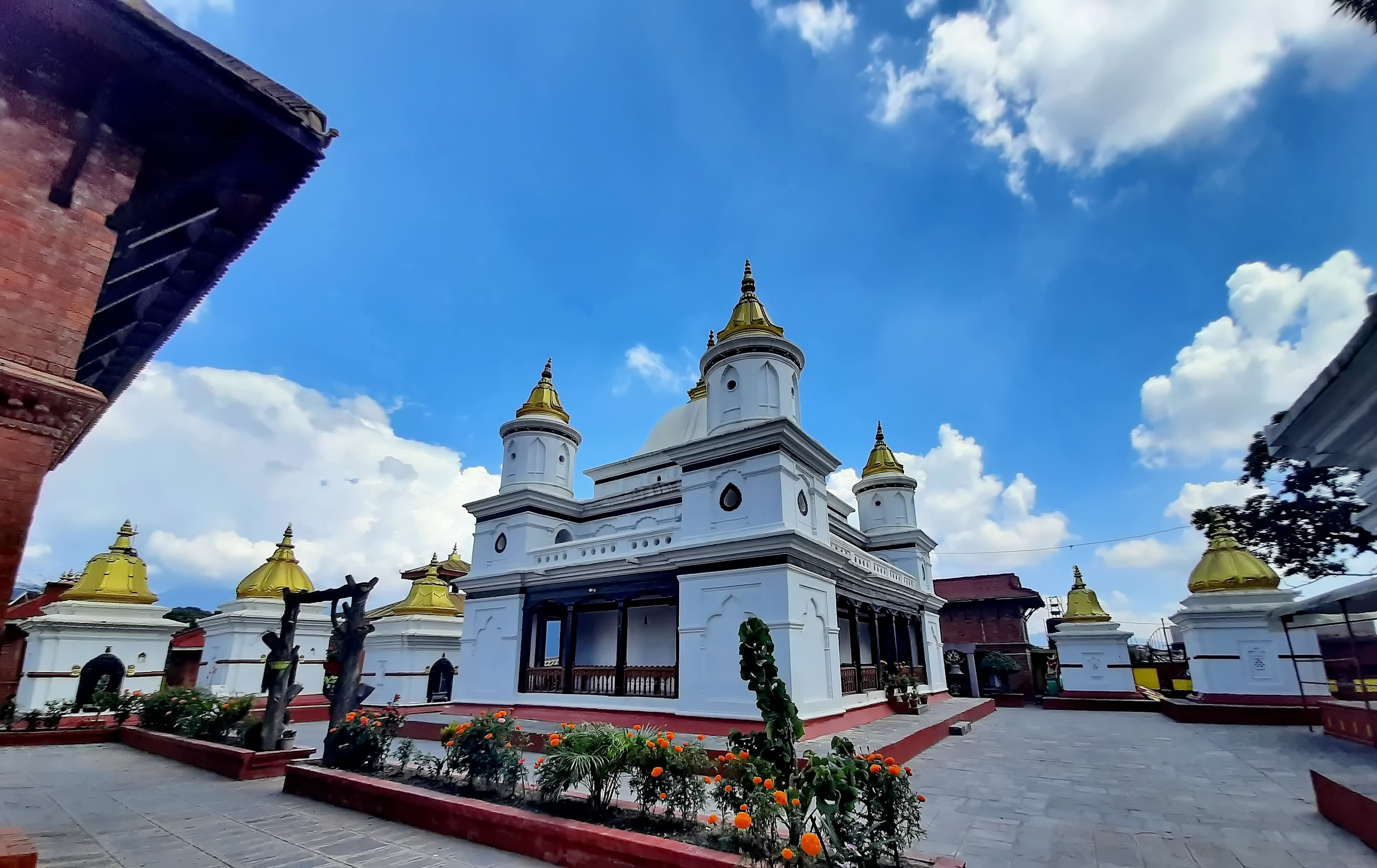
Ramchandra Temple, Kathmandu.

As a devotee of Hinduism, Khatri commissioned the Ramchandra Temple in Battisputali, Kathmandu, dedicated to Hindu deity Rama. According to local legend, the area later became known as Battisputali ("thirty-two butterflies") because of the 32 (battis) butterfly (putali) architectural motifs on the upper portion of the temple.

== See also ==
- KC (surname)
- Kot massacre
- Bhandarkhal massacre
- Rana dynasty
