= Hari Priya Devi =

- Sri Sri Sri Bada Maharani
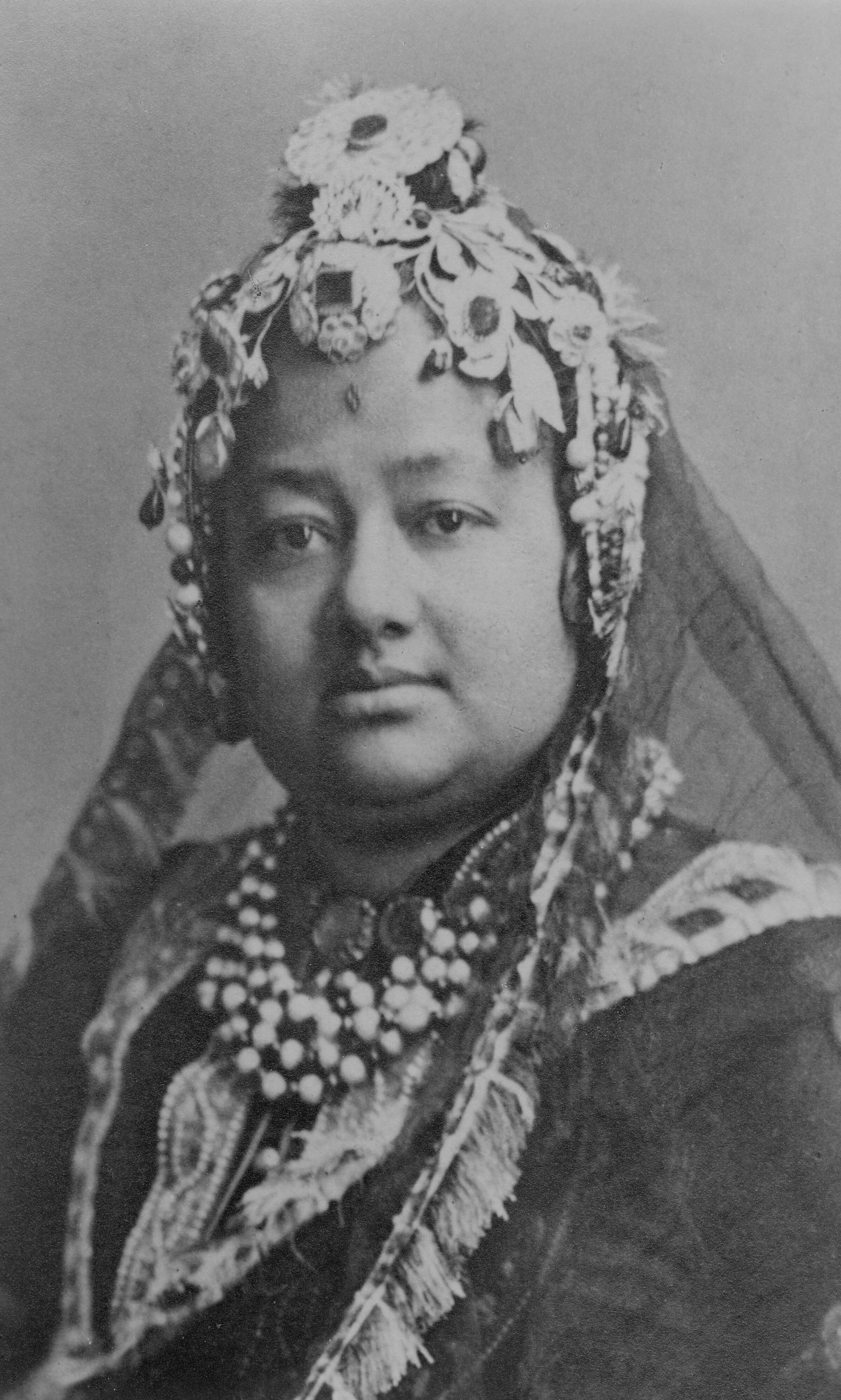
- Hari Priya Devi
- Spouse: Ranodip Singh Kunwar
- Dynasty: Rana dynasty
- Religion: Hinduism

Hari Priya Devi (Nepali: हरिप्रिया देवी) was a Nepalese Bada Maharani who was active in the Nepal Durbar politics. She was the second wife of Ranodip Singh Kunwar, the second prime minister of Nepal from the Rana dynasty.

== Biography ==
Devi was married to Ranodip Singh Kunwar, the second prime minister of Nepal from the Rana dynasty, as a second wife. Hari Priya Devi was described to be "a most arrogant woman", "a vain and domineering woman", and hot-tempered.

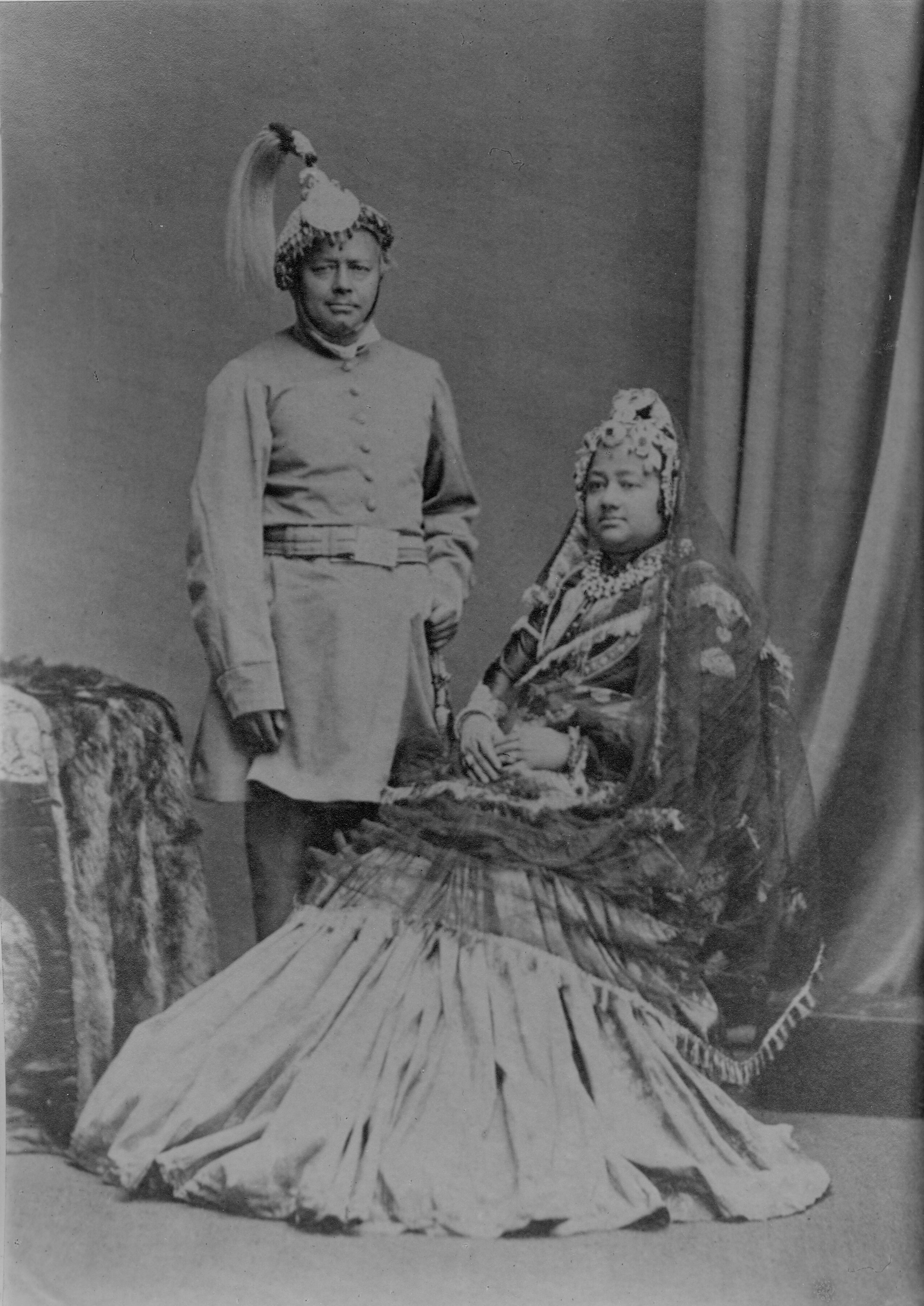
Hari Priya Devi with Ranodip Singh Kunwar

In July 1883, Kunwar's first wife died, subsequently, Devi was promoted to the position of Bada Maharani (lit. Senior Maharani). As Bada Maharani, she held substantial power in the Nepal Durbar. In 1882, Jagat Jung Rana, the eldest son of Jung Bahadur Rana, led an attempted coup d'état twice against both the Prime Minister Ranodip Singh and the Army Chief Dhir Shumsher, as a result of this, he was removed from the roles of the succession of Ranas and was exiled to British India. Devi was sympathetic to Jung Bahadur's sons, as a result, she invited Jagat back to Kathmandu, and asked Ranodip Singh to make him the Commander-In-Chief of the Nepalese Army. Her interference in state affairs resulted in a political crisis and it eventually led to the 1885 Nepal coup d'état.

Devi's husband Ranodip Singh Kunwar was killed in the coup d'état. As a result, she took refuge in the British Residency, later, she was exiled to British India indefinitely.
