= Rana Shumsher Jung Bahadur Rana =

- रण शमशेर जङ्गबहादुर राणा
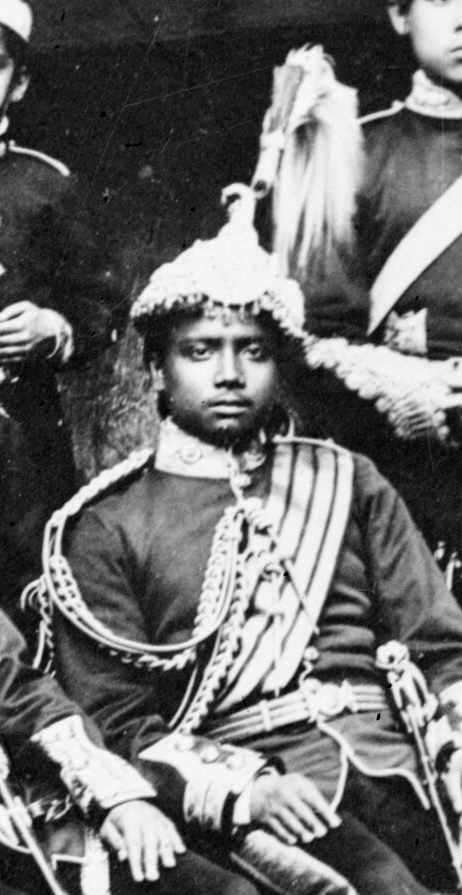
- Rana Shumsher Jung Bahadur Rana

Commander-In-Chief of the Nepalese Army
- In office March 1887 – June 1887
- Monarch: Prithvi Bir Bikram Shah
- Prime Minister: Bir Shumsher Jung Bahadur Rana
- Preceded by: Khadga Shumsher Jung Bahadur Rana
- Succeeded by: Dev Shumsher Jung Bahadur Rana

Personal details
- Born: 1861 Kathmandu, Nepal
- Died: 1887 (aged 25–26) Nepal
- Relations: Rana dynasty
- Parent: Dhir Shamsher Rana (father)

Rana Shumsher Rana (posthumously known as Rana Shumsher Jung Bahadur Rana (Nepali: रण शमशेर जङ्गबहादुर राणा); 1861–1887) was the Commander-In-Chief of the Nepalese Army from March 1887 to June 1887.

Rana was born in 1861 in Kathmandu to Dhir Shamsher Rana as a fourth child. He had a reputation of being a drunkard. During the 1885 Nepal coup d'état, he was tasked by Bir Shumsher to keep Dhoj Narsingh Rana distracted by drinking with him in his room, while other would assassinate Ranodip Singh Kunwar.

Rana rose to power after Khadga Shumsher Jung Bahadur Rana was removed from the rolls of succession and Rana died in office after serving as the commander-in-chief for three months. He was succeeded by his brother Dev Shumsher Jung Bahadur Rana.

He died in June 1887.
