= Battle of Alau =

1847 battle between Jung Bahadur Rana and King Rajendra

Date	28 July 1847
Location	Alau, Nepal
Result	Victory of Jung Bahadur Rana

Belligerents
Nepal Army	King Rajendra's army

Commanders and leaders
Jung Bahadur Rana Sanak Singh Khatri	Rajendra Bikram Shah; Guru Prasad Shah

Casualties and losses
0	300

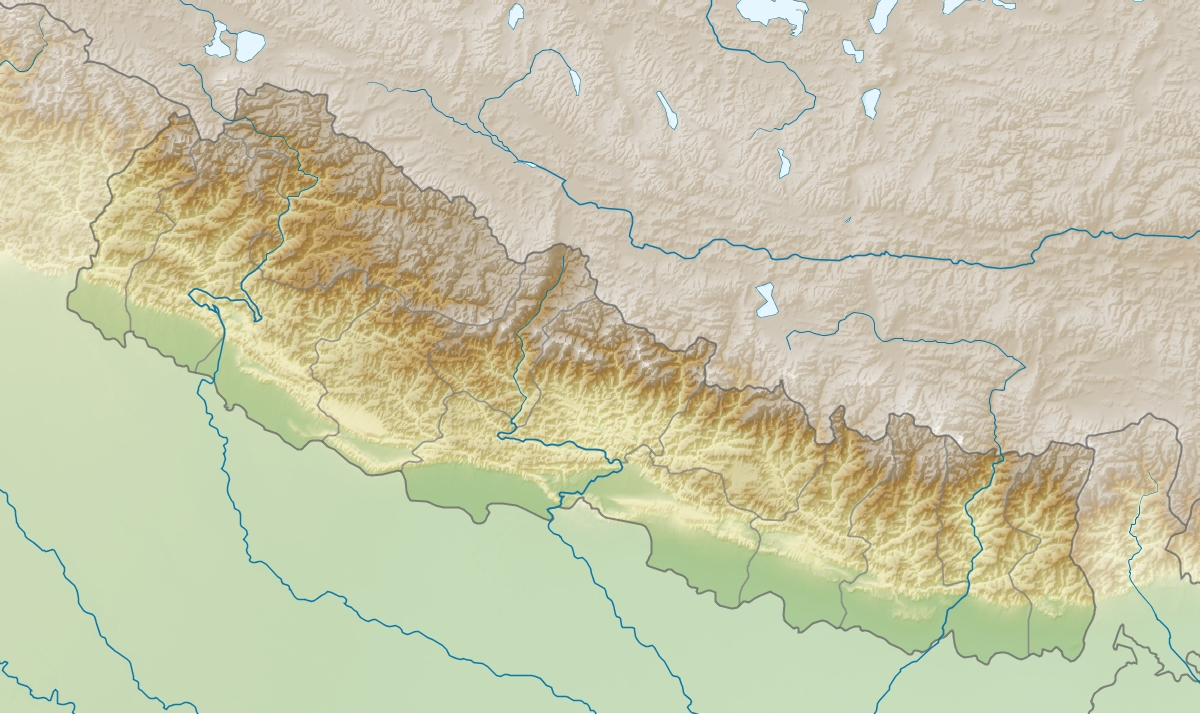
Location in present-day Nepal

The Battle of Alau was fought in Alau, Parsa District on 28 July 1847. It was fought between the armies of Rajendra Bikram Shah and Jung Bahadur Rana and in this confrontation, Jung Bahadur's army won against Rajendra's army and arrested King Rajendra.

After the Bhandarkhal Parva, King Rajendra went to Kashi with the queen. In this period, Jung Bahadur dethroned King Rajendra and replaced him with prince Surendra. Rajendra, then, started plotting the removal of Jung Bahadur with his consultants. However, Jung Bahadur was aware of this conspiracy because he had sent his spies with King Rajendra to Kashi. As a result, King Rajendra's army was slaughtered in Alau and he was then put under arrest. This event is popularly known as 'Alau Parva' in Nepal.

== See also ==
- List of massacres in Nepal
