= Jit Jung Rana =

- जीतजङ्ग राणा
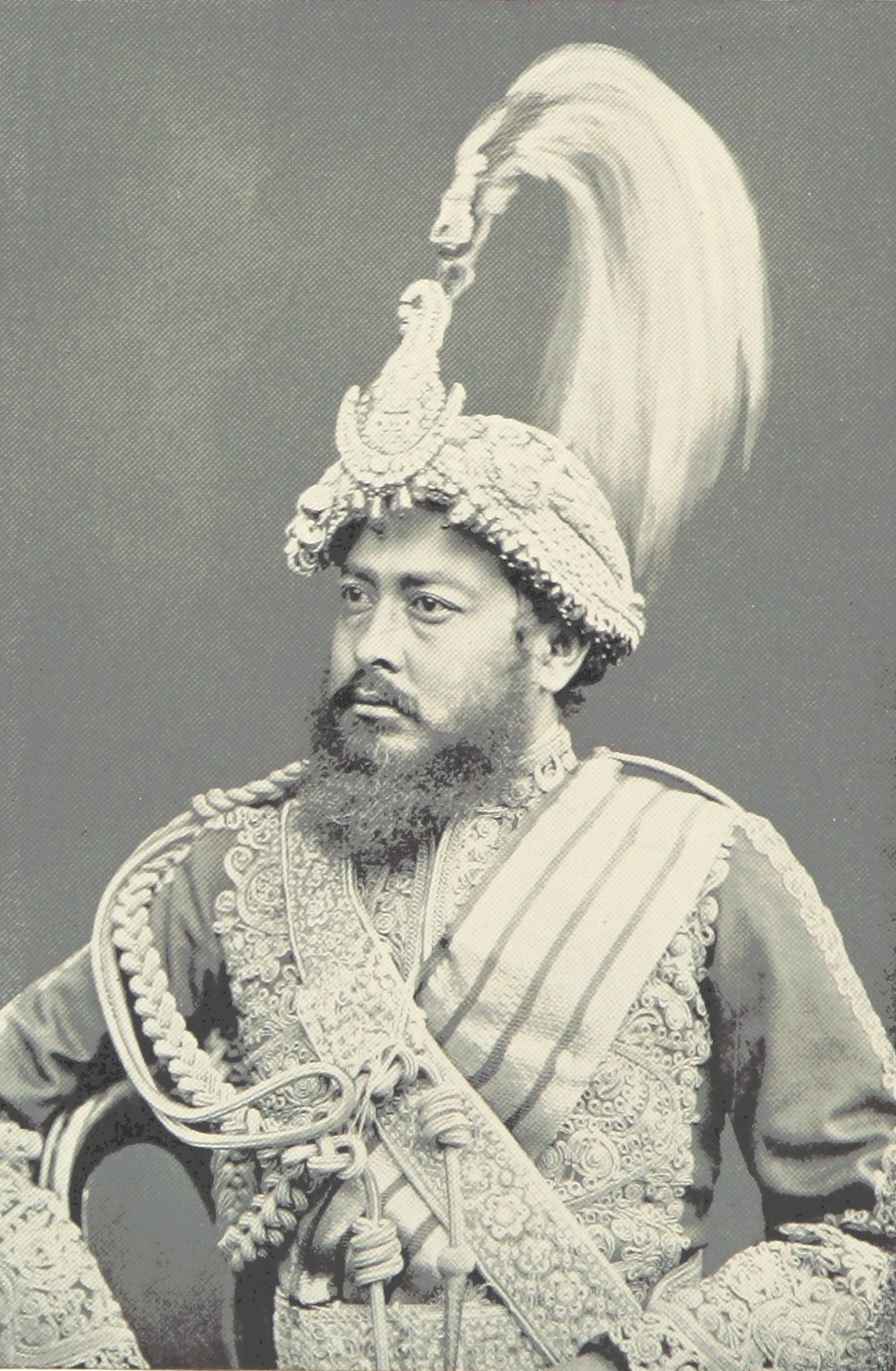
- Jit Jung Rana in 1895

Commander-In-Chief of the Nepalese Army
- In office 1884–1885
- Monarch: Prithvi Bir Bikram Shah
- Prime Minister: Ranodip Singh Kunwar
- Preceded by: Dhir Shumsher Rana
- Succeeded by: Khadga Shumsher Jung Bahadur Rana

Personal details
- Born: Jit Jung Kunwar
- Relations: Rana dynasty
- Parents: Jung Bahadur Rana (father); Kahila Maharani Nanda Kumari Khatri (mother)
- Relatives: Jagat Jang Rana (brother)

Jit Jung Kunwar Rana (Nepali: जीतजङ्ग राणा) was the Commander-In-Chief of the Nepalese Army from 14 October 1884 to 1885.

== Biography ==
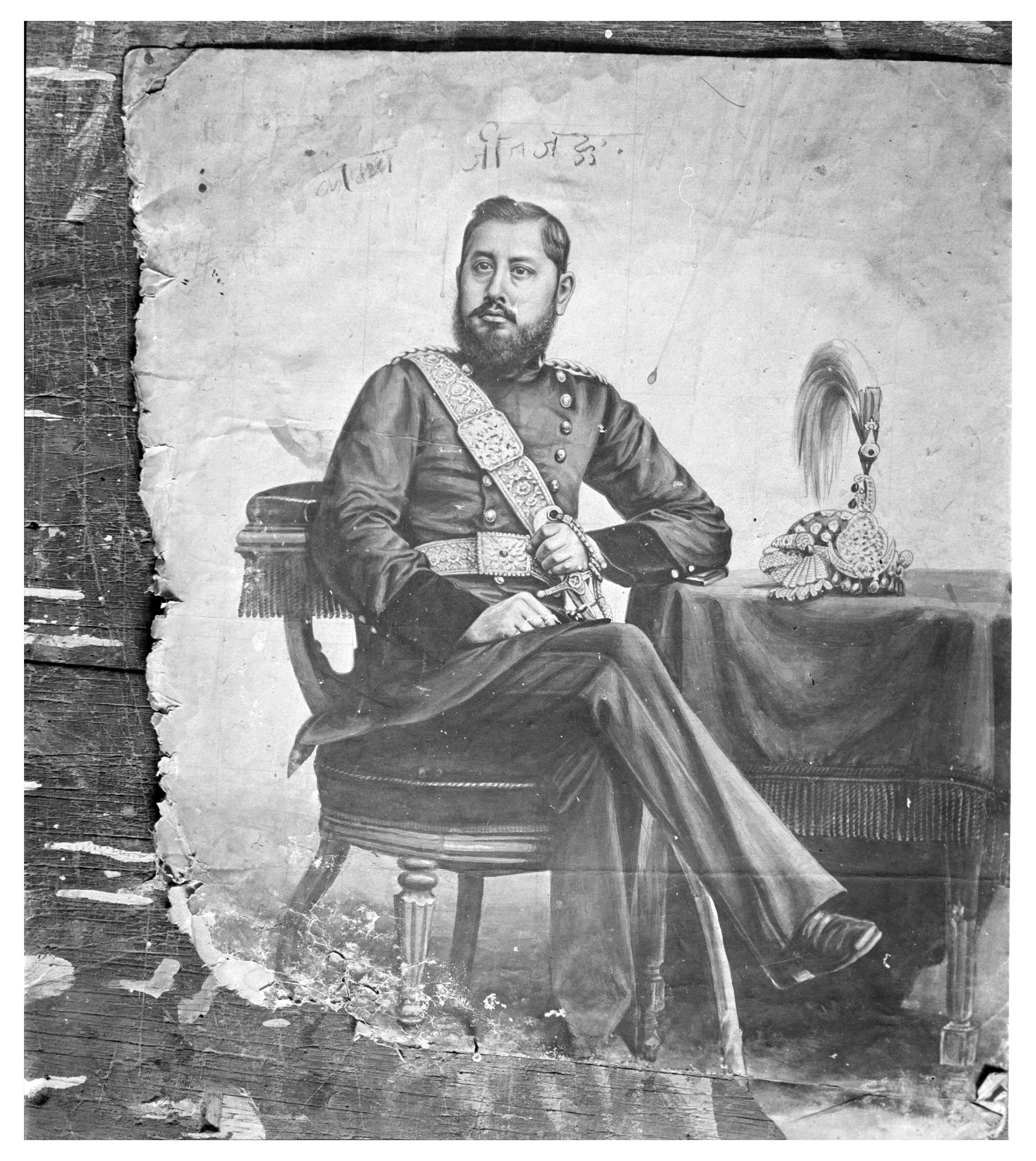
Jit Jung Rana

He was the second son of Jung Bahadur Rana, the first Prime Minister of Nepal from the Rana dynasty.

On 14 October 1884, following the death of his uncle Dhir Shumsher Rana, Jit was promoted to be the Commander-In-Chief of the Nepalese Army.

On 24 February 1855, Rana married the second daughter of King Prithvi Bir Bikram Shah.

He was removed from power following the 1885 Nepal coup d'état where his brother Jagat Jang Rana and his uncle Ranodip Singh Kunwar were killed.

Rana was succeeded by Khadga Shumsher Jung Bahadur Rana. In the 1850s, he built Ranibas Palace (later converted into a Hindu temple) at Simraungadh in memory of his father, Jung Bahadur Rana.
