= Khadga Shumsher Jung Bahadur Rana =

Nepalese politician and military general

Commanding-General H.H. Raja Khadga Shamsher Jang Bahadur Rana
- खड्ग शमशेर जङ्गबहादुर राणा
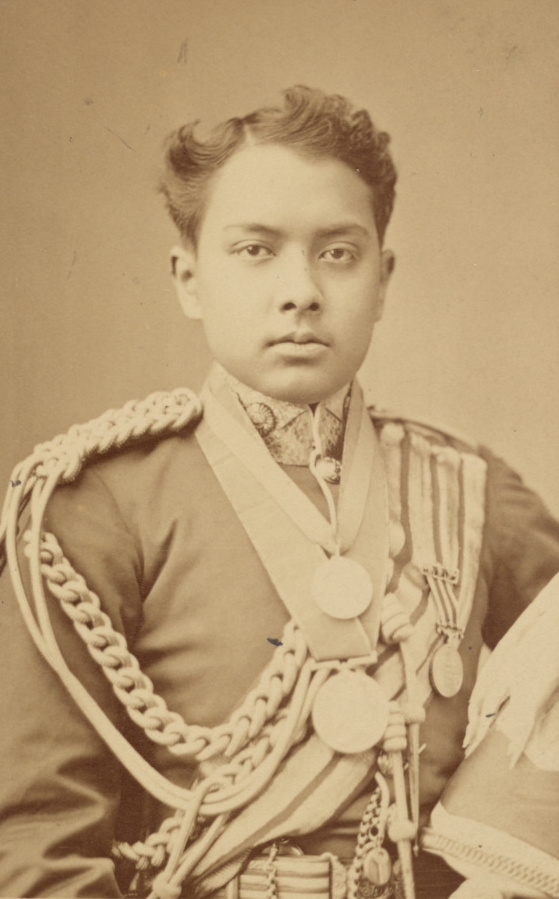
- Khadga Shumsher in 1883

Commander-In-Chief of the Nepalese Army
- In office 22 November 1885 – 13 March 1887
- Monarch: Prithvi of Nepal
- Preceded by: Jit Jung Rana
- Succeeded by: Rana Shumsher Jung Bahadur Rana

Personal details
- Born: Khadga Shamsher Kunwar Rana; 16 February 1861 Kathmandu, Nepal
- Died: 22 December 1921 (aged 60) Nepal Palace, Saugor (present day Sagar, Madhya Pradesh, India)
- Spouse: Dhan Kumari Rajya Lakhmi
- Parents: Dhir Shamsher Rana (father); Nanda Kumari Thapa (mother)
- Relatives: see Rana dynasty
- Known for: Coup of 1885; Discovery of Lumbini (1896)

Military service
- Allegiance: Nepal
- Rank: General

Commanding-General His Highness Raja Khadga Shamsher Jang Bahadur Rana (Nepali: खड्ग शमशेर जङ्गबहादुर राणा) or Khadga Shamsher Jang Bahadur Kunwar Rana previously known as Khadga Shamsher Kunwar Rana was Nepalese politician, military general, governor and courtier in the Kingdom of Nepal. He was born in the Rana dynasty as third son of Commander-In-Chief of the Nepalese Army Dhir Shamsher Kunwar Rana. He was influential in the family coup of 1885 that led to the political rise of his Shamsher faction through the murders of then ruling Prime Minister of Nepal and his uncle Maharaja Ranodip Singh Kunwar, Ranodip's favourite nephew and would-be-successor Jagat Jang Rana and his other politically rival non-Shamsher cousins. In the aftermath of the coup, he secured the position of the Commander-In-Chief of the Nepalese Army and was second-in-line to Prime Minister Maharaja Bir Shamsher Jang Bahadur Rana before he was removed out of the roll of the succession of Ranas in 1887. Afterwards, he served as Governor of Palpa and constructed the renowned Rani Mahal. In December 1896, he together with German archaeologist Dr. Alois Anton Führer discovered the Lumbini pillar inscription of Ashoka that proved Gautam Buddha's birthplace as Lumbini.

== Early life ==
Khadga Shamsher was born on 16 February 1861 as the third of the seventeen sons of Commander-In-Chief of the Nepalese Army Dhir Shamsher Rana with his third wife Nanda Kumari Thapa, of whom he was the first son. His mother was a sister of Colonel Keshar Singh Thapa. Among the seventeen sons of Dhir Shamsher, he was junior only to the eldest Bir Shamsher and the illegitimate brother Dambar Shamsher. His other three co-uterine brothers were Dev Shamsher, Chandra Shamsher and Bhim Shamsher. He served as Lieutenant Colonel (Nepali convention) in the Nepalese Army in his early youth.

== Career ==
=== 42 Saalko Parva (Coup of 1885) ===
On 30 Ashwin 1941 (14 October 1884), Dhir Shamsher died unexpectedly by choking. His death uplifted the role of succession of all the roleholder Ranas. As per the role of succession of the Ranas published on 10 Mangshir 1941 (23 November 1884), Lieutenant Colonel Khadga Shamsher Kunwar Rana was ranked tenth-in-line to the throne of Prime Minister and Shree Teen Maharaja. Meanwhile Prime Minister Ranoddip Singh Kunwar began to impease his outcast nephew Jagat Jang Kunwar Rana. Also, the Queen Mother Tara Kumari imprisoned Bir Shamsher shortly for protesting against her proposal of Jagat Jang as the successor of Ranoddip Singh. These events escalated the insecurity of Shamsher brothers and were strongly determined to achieve the power against Jagat Jang through the murder of Ranoddip Singh. Ranoddip Singh planned to send the Shamsher brothers with troops to Delhi on a British military exhibition and declare Jagat Jang as his successor. However, Shamsher brothers counterplanned an intrigue to murder their uncle Ranoddip Singh using the large command of troops under them as well as the recently flattened bodyguards and counsellor of Ranodip Singh. The date of the murder was affixed on 9 Mangshir 1942 and on that night, Bir Shamsher, Dambar Shamsher, Khadga Shamsher, Chandra Shamsher and Bhim Shamsher entered the Palace of Ranoddip Singh. At 9 pm, the murder was executed by three of them - Dambar Shamsher, Khadga Shamsher and Bhim Shamsher. Khadga Shamsher's second bullet shot mortally wounded Ranodip Singh. Over an hour, there was a declaration in the Tundikhel that Bir Shamsher was the new Shree Teen Maharaja. It was supported by second Queen Mother Lalit Rajeshwari who made an emotional appeal in front of soldiers. Khadga Shamsher in jubilation shouted Shree Teen Maharaja Ki and was responded "Jai" by the soldiers. Bir Shamsher was now legitimately accepted by the soldiers. Till his later life, Khadga Shamsher boasted about the coup that he "... won the Kingdom of Nepal over an hour by a single bullet."

=== Coup attempt and removal from succession (1887) ===
In the aftermath of coup, all the Shamsher brothers added the title of Jang Bahadur to their name. Khadga Shamsher received the position of the Commander-In-Chief of the Nepalese Army and was second-in-line to Prime Minister Maharaja Bir Shamsher Jang Bahadur Rana in the new role of succession and furthermore received some of the authority from Bir Shamsher as reward. He began to grow more arrogant that his effort took Shamsher family and Bir Shamsher to the apex of political power. He began to run administration without the suggestion of his brother Bir Shamsher. He became ambitious to capture the Prime Ministership and initiated activities against Bir Shamsher. In retaliation, Bir Shamsher dismissed all of the employees of Khadga Shamsher making him more frustrated. Khadga Shamsher planned a coup against his brother Bir Shamsher on the planned eve of Bratabandha ceremony of his younger brother Colonel Sher Shamsher on middle of Falgun month of 1943 Vikram Samvat at his residence in Thapathali Durbar. He had his brother Commanding-General Chandra Shamsher and youngest Queen Mother Bishnu Divyeshwari, a daughter of uncle Jagat Shamsher Kunwar Rana, by his side. Bir Shamsher, though warned by his bodyguard Colonel Faud Singh Khatri, went on to attend the ceremony. Suddenly, the palace was closed after the end of the ceremony even on the presence of the Prime Minister Bir Shamsher which was against the tradition of the period. The personal spies of Bir Shamsher reported the event of door closure including the absence of Khadga Shamsher from the main scene. Bir Shamsher felt insecure and planned to exit. However, he found the door closed as foretold and quickly exited the palace by threatening the doorguard. The coup attempt was met with failure and the event further escalated the insecurity of Khadga Shamsher. On 23 Falgun 1943, there was an invitation to Prime Minister Bir Shamsher to attend the occasion of Samyak Puja of Buddhists without arms at Swayambhu. Khadga Shamsher yet again planned to arrest Bir Shamsher and exile him. The plan was again revealed to the Prime Minister by his bodyguard Faud Singh Khatri and Prime Minister Bir did not attend the ceremony. Khadga Shamsher also had his maternal uncle Colonel Keshar Singh Thapa and brother Chandra Shamsher by his side. When Prime Minister Bir Shamsher did not attend the ceremony, he sent Chandra Shamsher to call upon the Prime Minister in his private residence at Hiti Darbar. However, Chandra Shamsher stayed and the ambitious plan of Khadga Shamsher was nulled yet again. On the evening of the same day, Prime Minister Bir Shamsher called upon Khadga Shamsher at his residence which he could not disobey. When Khadga Shamsher landed from his riding horse at the Prime Minister's residence, he was subsequently arrested by the security forces. Prime Minister Bir Shamsher himself exclaimed that Khadga Shamsher was removed out of the role of succession and the position of Commander-in-chief, and therefore, he was exiled to Palpa.

=== Governorship of Palpa ===
Though initially he lived an exile life at Palpa, he was made the provincial governor of Palpa subsequently.

=== Discovery of Lumbini (1896) ===
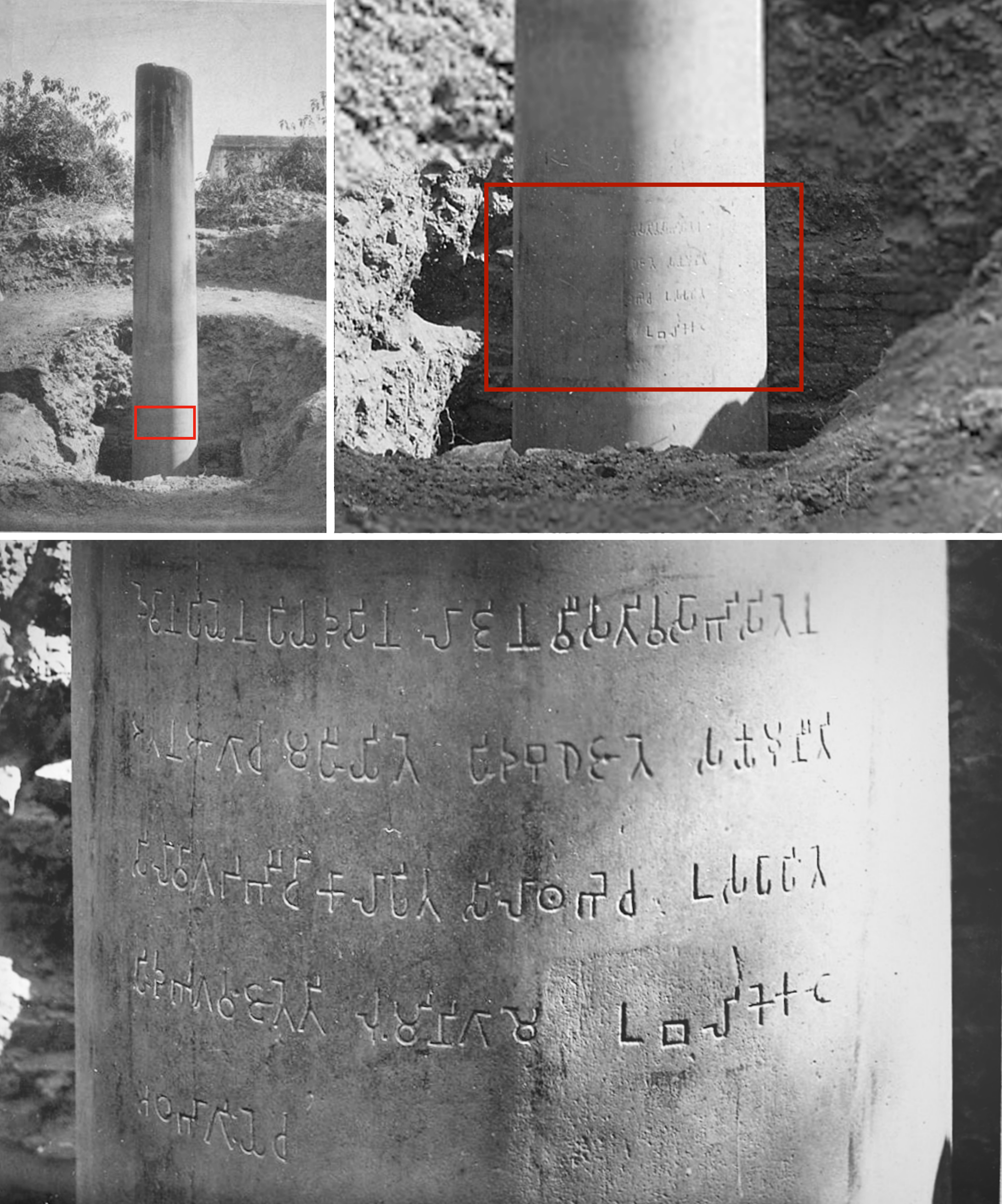
Lumbini Rummindei pillar at time of discovery in 1896, with location of the inscription, which was hidden about 1 meter under ground level.

In December 1896, German archaeologist Dr. Alois Anton Führer was making a follow-up survey of the nearby Nigali-Sagar pillar which was earlier discovered and investigated by him in March 1895. According to some accounts, Fuhrer found the Lumbini pillar on 1 December, and then asked the help of the regional governor, General Khadga Shamsher Rana, to excavate it. According to other accounts, General Khadga Shamsher knew the location of the pillar and led Führer to it. It had also been reported by Khadga Shamsher to Irish Indologist Vincent Arthur Smith a few year earlier. Initially, only the top of the pillar was visible, with a medieval inscription on it. The Nepalese authorities under General Khadga Shamsher dug around the pillar, to find the ancient Brahmi inscription, which therefore had remained underground, hidden from view. It established Lumbini as the birthplace of Buddha since Ashoka visited and identified it in the 3rd century BCE. (As per the many published articles and books written on this subject, it is not true that "Mr A. Fuhrer found the Lumbini pillar on 01 December and then asked the help of the regional Governor Khadga Shamsher Rana, to excavate it". In fact it seems it was the other way around. The Governor Khadga Shamsher Rana had earlier excavated the pillar with the help of Nepali sappers and local men, and on finding inscriptions on it which he was unable to read, made rubbings of it and sent it across the border to India, to a Mr V.Smith who was also interested in archaeology and had a farm nearby, for help in deciphering the strange language. Unfortunately Mr V.Smith was unable to do so as he was not trained in this field. It was only then that the help of Mr A. Fuhrer was sought. He was attached to the Lucknow Archaeology Department as one of its leading members, I am not aware of his exact post title, and had also been searching and excavating across the border in India looking for Buddhas birthplace and the city he lived in. Being an expert in this field Mr Fuhrer immediately identified the language and what it said - That the pillar marked the spot where Lord Buddha was born. Unfortunately Mr Furher took the entire credit of the discovery and failed to mention the important role that Governor General Khadga Shamsher Rana had played in it, not only for the excavation of the Ashokan pillar but also for the entire sequence of events that eventually led to the knowledge that it marked the place where Buddha was born to the entire world. It was only later that this truth came out when Mr Fuhrer was being investigated for fraud and was sacked from his position and sent away in disgrace. During this troublesome period in Mr Fuhrer's life he had written to the Governor General seeking his help in telling the world that he did indeed help in the finding of the birthplace of Lord Buddha, which The Governor General did reply to, in a series of back and forth letters that are very interesting reading. These letters to Mr A.Fuhrer by Governor General Khadga Shamsher Rana, along with his own articles of the various areas he excavated around Lumbini, were published in the Pioneer, the leading newspaper in India at that time that was published in Allahabad, a city in India. The articles and letters to Mr Fuhrer make very interesting reading, they have been dug up from rooms that have been dust covered and with dark interiors, and then have been compiled and published in a book in Nepal, by Harihar Raj Joshi and his wife ) Harihar Raj Joshi

== Retirement and death ==
After many years of governing Palpa, Khadga Shamsher finally settled in present day Sagar, Madhya Pradesh in India for rest of his life. He died on 22 December 1921 at Nepal Palace in Saugor (Sagar).

== Descendants ==
He had eight sons and several daughters. His grandson Guna Shamsher Jang Bahadur Rana was the Commander-in-chief of the Nepalese Army from 1975 to 1980. His two granddaughters through his son Tunga Shamsher were married to the sons of Maharaja of Tehri Garhwal Narendra Shah. His grandson Jagadish Shamsher Jang Bahadur Rana was the Nepalese ambassador to USSR (1971-1977) and to India (1983-1985). His eldest daughter Ganga Kumari Devi was married to Raja Dev Jang Bahadur Singh of Bajhang. One of his daughter Thakurani Chuda Devyashwari Devi was married to Thakur Mahendra Singh of Sagar; whose children was Vijaya Raje Scindia who went on to become Queen of Gwalior State in India.

== Palaces ==
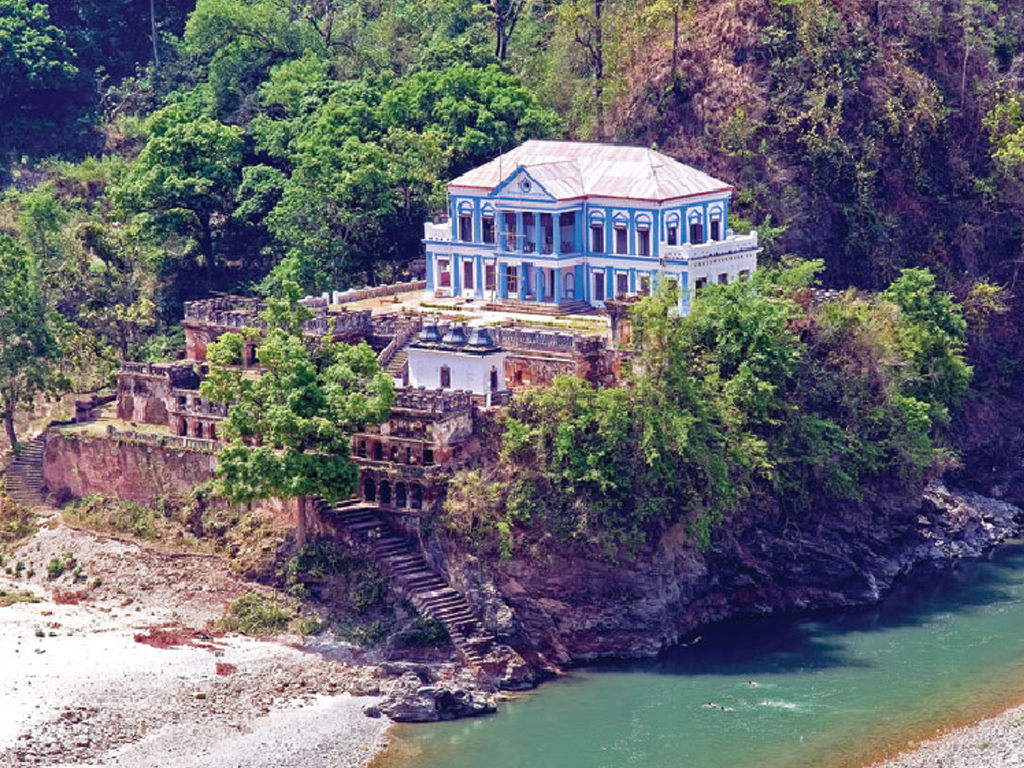
Rani Mahal (1893 CE) built by Khadga Shamsher on the bank of Kali Gandaki river, Palpa

He had lived in Thapathali Durbar where he performed Bratabandha ceremony for his brother Colonel Sher Shamsher in Falgun 1943 Vikram Samvat. Rani Mahal (literally "Queen's Palace") is a palace located in the banks of Kali Gandaki River in Palpa district of Nepal, which was constructed by General Khadga Shamsher in 1893 AD in the memory of his queen.

== Ancestry ==
Ancestors of Khadga Shumsher Jung Bahadur Rana

16. Ram Krishna Kunwar
8. Ranajit Kunwar
4. Bal Narsingh Kunwar
2. Dhir Shamsher Rana
20. Amar Singh Thapa (Sanukaji General) (= 12)
10. Nain Singh Thapa
21. Satyarupa Maya (= 13)
5. Ganesh Kumari Thapa
22. Ranajit Pande
11. Rana Kumari Pande
1. Khadga Shamsher Jang Bahadur Rana
24. Bir Bhadra Thapa
12. Amar Singh Thapa (Sanukaji General)
6. Bakhtawar Singh Thapa
13. Satyarupa Maya
3. Nanda Kumari Thapa

== Books ==
- Acharya, Baburam (2019). Acharya, Shrikrishna (ed.). Aba Yasto Kahilyai Nahos (in Nepali). Kathmandu: Fine Print Books. ISBN 978-9937-665-40-7.
