= Bhandarkhal massacre =

Bhandarkhal massacre may refer to:

- 1806 Bhandarkhal massacre, led by Bhimsen Thapa
- 1846 Bhandarkhal massacre, led by Jung Bahadur Rana
