= Balkot =

Balkot may refer to:

- Balkot, Lumbini, a town in southern Nepal
- Balkot, Bagmati, a village and Village Development Committee in central Nepal
