= Nepal-Tibet War =

Nepal-Tibet War may refer to:

- Sino-Nepalese War, war fought between 1789 and 1792
- Nepal–Tibet War (1855–1856), invasion of Tibet by Nepal from 1855 to 1856
