= Nanda Kumari Khatri =

- Queen Nanda Kumari / Badamaharani of Nepal
- Coronation: 1841 AD
- Spouse: Jung Bahadur Rana
- Issue: Jagat Jung Rana, Jit Jung Rana, Tara Laxmi Devi, Badan Kumari Devi
- Religion: Hinduism

Nanda Kumari Khatri was the second Queen of Nepal's ruler Jung Bahadur Rana. Jang Bahadur married Nanda Kumari, who was the sister of military commander Sanak Singh Khatri, in 1841.

She had four children Jagat Jung Rana, Badan Kumari Devi, Jeet Jung Rana and Tara Rajya Laxmi Devi all of whom married into Shah dynasty.
