= Dambar Shumsher Rana =

Nepalese general

General Dambar Shumsher Jung Bahadur Rana KIH,
- महारथी श्री डम्बर शमशेर जङ्गबहादुर राणा
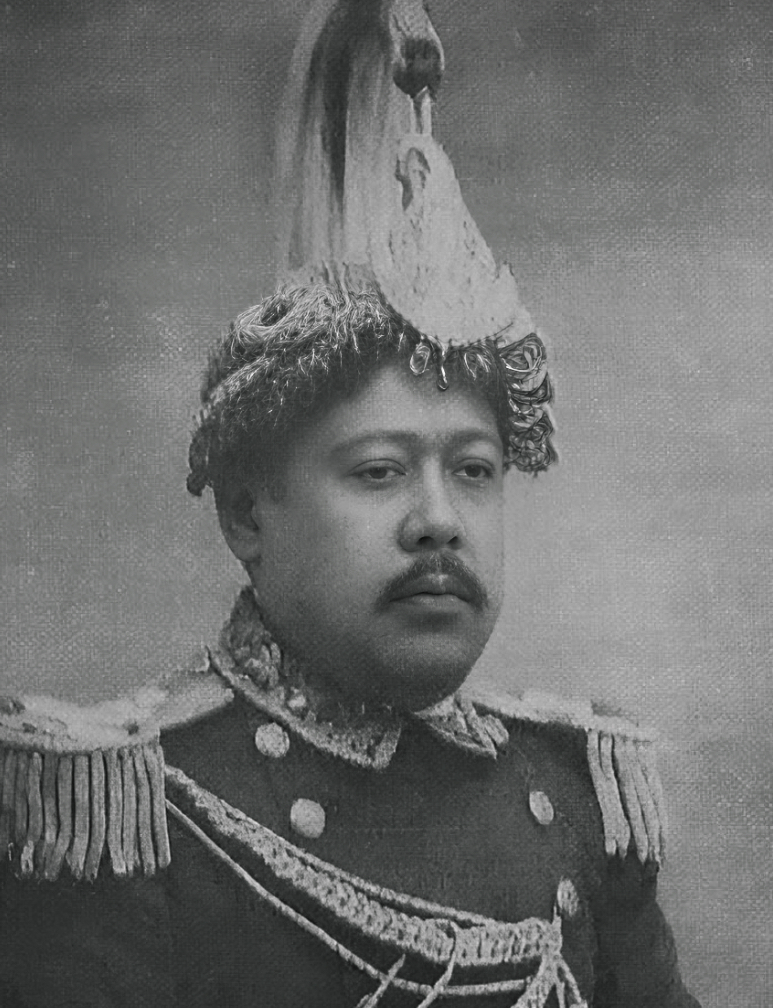
- Dambar Shumsher Jung Bahadur Rana

A.D.C General of the Prime Minister
- In office 22 November 1885 – 17 July 1892
- Monarch: Prithvi of Nepal

Personal details
- Born: 16 February 1859 Kathmandu, Nepal
- Died: 13 June 1922 (aged 63) Kathmandu, Nepal
- Spouse: Indra Rajya Lakshmi
- Relations: Rana dynasty
- Children: Samar Shumsher Jung Bahadur Rana, Ved Shumsher Jung Bahadur Rana, Basudev Shumsher Jung Bahadur Rana
- Parent: Dhir Shamsher Rana (father)
- Known for: 1885 Nepal coup d'état, First Photographer Of Nepal

Military service
- Allegiance: Nepal
- Rank: General

Dambar Shumsher Jung Bahadur Rana (Nepali: डम्बर शमशेर जङ्गबहादुर राणा; also known as Sano Maila (Nepali: सानो माइला); 1859–1922 was an early Nepalese photographer, as well as military general, and courtier in the Kingdom of Nepal.

== Biography ==
Dambar Shumsher Jung Bahadur Rana was born in the Rana dynasty as the second son of Commander-In-Chief of the Nepalese Army Dhir Shamsher Kunwar Rana.

Dambar Shamsher Rana enjoyed a life of luxury and comfort. His only source of dissatisfaction in life was not being included in the rolls of succession. He was not in the rolls of succession as he was born out of wedlock.

However, this dissatisfaction was compensated for by the unlimited freedom, wealth, and luxurious items that he possessed, along with a constant stream of women. To forget his exclusion from the succession rolls, he indulged in alcohol, entertainment, and women.

He was treated with high respect.

His palace in Gyaneshwar, Kathmandu was immense and expansive. The Durbar was adorned with luxury items beyond imagination, and he even had a private theater within its walls.

== Career ==
In 1872, he joined the Royal Nepalese Army as a Commissioned Captain. He was both bold and selfish. In 1877, he was promoted to the rank of Colonel. Then, in 1882, just five years later, he rose through the ranks once again and became a General.

He was the first to fire a bullet in 1885 Nepal coup d'état which resulted in the political ascension of his Shumsher faction. This was accomplished through the assassination of the ruling Prime Minister of Nepal at that time, as well as his uncle Maharaja Ranodip Singh Kunwar.

After the coup, he was able to secure the role of Aide-de-camp general for a period of time under his elder half-brother Maharaja Bir Shumsher Jung Bahadur Rana, who held the position of Prime Minister of Nepal.

Dambar Shumsher Jung Bahadur Rana had staged pageants and plays for the nobles from the Rana dynasty. In 1893, after a trip to Calcutta and time spent at the Indian Theater School, he founded the Royal Imperial Opera House in Narayanhiti Palace, Kathmandu.

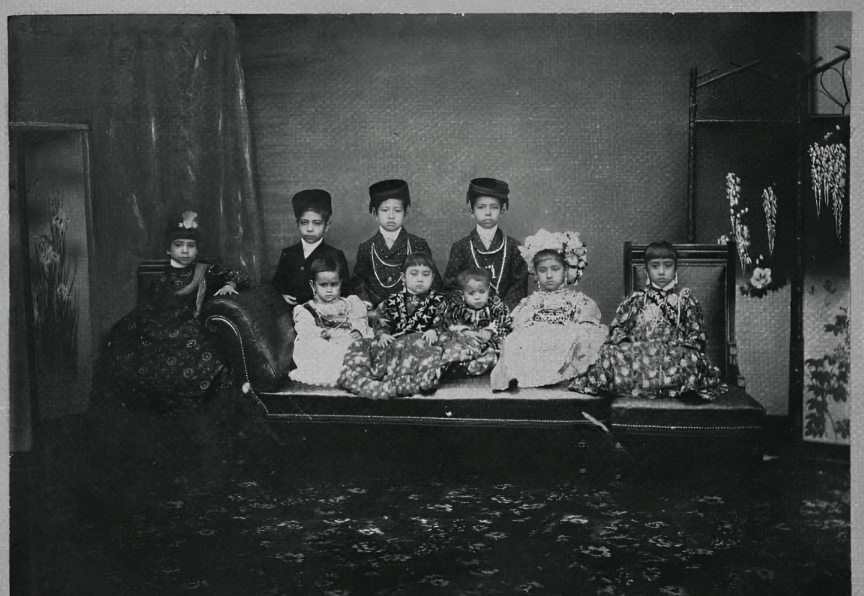
A group portrait of Dambar Shumsher's grandchildren

Pushkar Shumsher Jung Bahadur Rana, Mehar Shumsher Jung Bahadur Rana, and Bal Krishna Shumsher Jung Bahadur Rana were his grandsons.

Pushkar Shumsher was a renowned short story writer, Mehar Shumsher was a distinguished Military General, and Balkrishna Sama is recognised as one of the greatest dramatists in Nepal.

Dambar Shumsher Jung Bahadur Rana was also the first photographer of Nepal. He trained many local people, including Purna Man Chitrakar in photography, which reduced the dominance of British photographers.

== Death and Afterward ==
Dambar Shumsher Jung Bahadur Rana died in June 1922 in Kathmandu, and was cremated with full military honors at Arya Ghat, Pashupatinath.

== Honors ==
- (United Kingdom) Kaiser-i-Hind (KIH) – 1903
- (British Raj) Delhi Durbar Medal – 1893
- (United Kingdom) Delhi Durbar Medal – 1905
