= 1846 Bhandarkhal massacre =

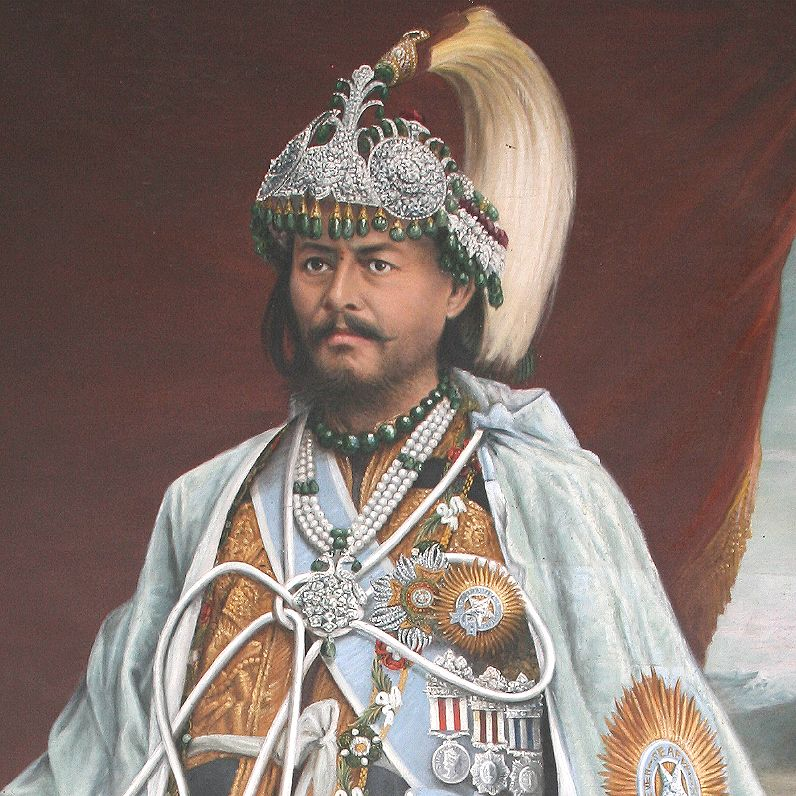
- Jang Bahadur Rana
- Location: 27.704°N 85.307°E; Kathmandu Durbar Square
- Date: 31 October 1846
- Attack type: political assassination
- Weapons: Talwar, Khunda, rifle, Khukuri
- Deaths: At least 30
- Perpetrators: Jung Bahadur Rana and his supporters

The Bhandarkhal massacre (Nepali: भण्डारखाल पर्व) was a political massacre that occurred in Bhandarkhal garden of Hanuman Dhoka, Kathmandu on 31 October 1846.

It was led by Jung Bahadur Rana and his supporters, a month after the infamous Kot massacre, and at least 30 people were killed in it.
