= Balkot, Arghakhanchi =

Balkot बालकोट
- Village development committee
- Location in Lumbini Province Balkot (Nepal)
- Coordinates: 27°58′N 83°14′E
- Country: Nepal
- Province: Lumbini Province
- District: Arghakhanchi District

Population (2001)
  - Total: 4,532
  - Religions: Hindu
- Time zone: UTC+5:45 (Nepal Time)

Balkot is a small town in Arghakhanchi District in Lumbini Province of southern Nepal. At the time of the 1991 Nepal census, the town had a population of 4283 living in 858 houses. At the time of the 2001 Nepal census, the population was 4532, of which 63% was literate.
