= Alau, Nepal =

Place in Nepal

Alau अलौ
- Village development committee
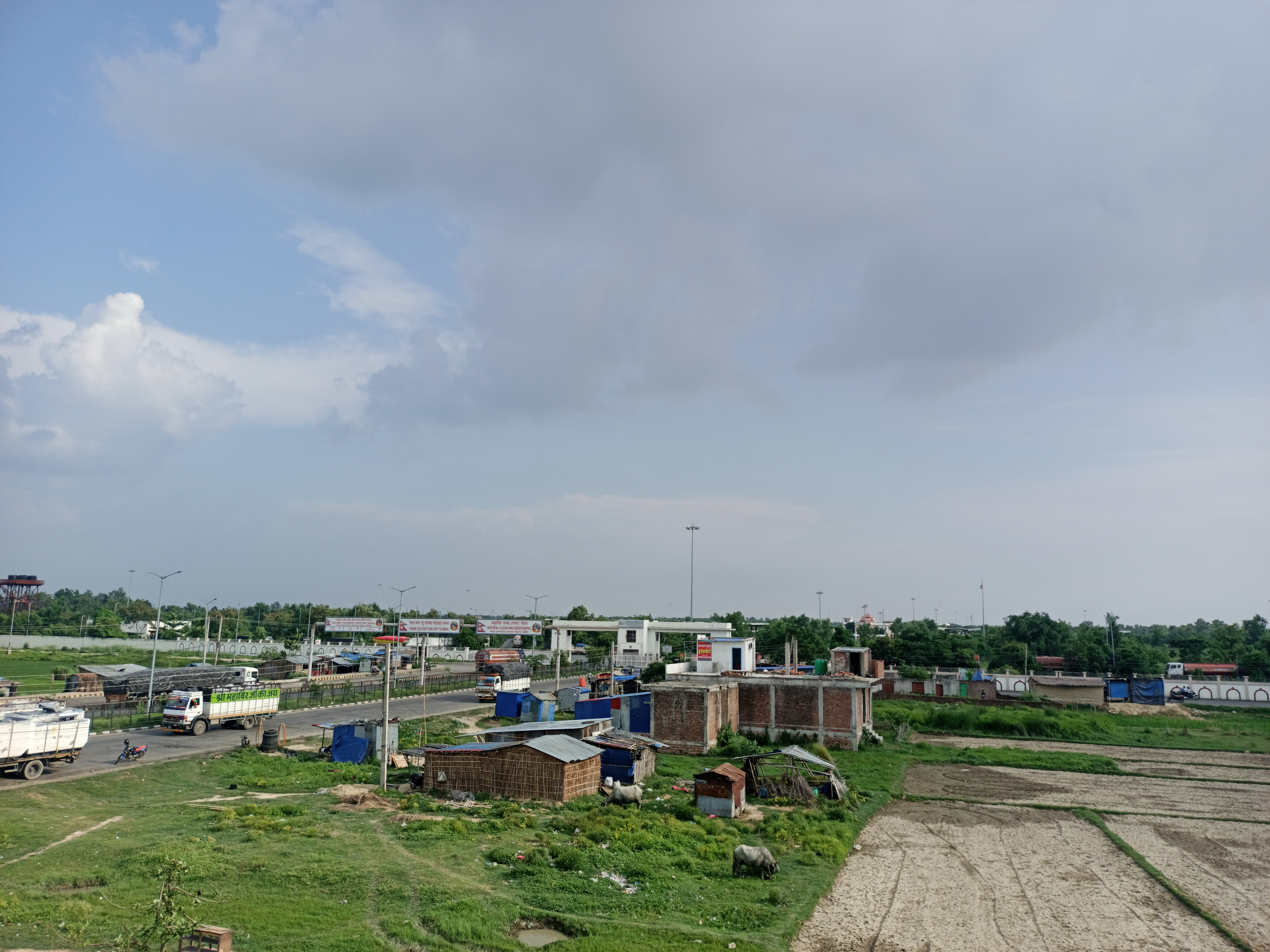
- ICP Birgunj Customs Office at Alau, Parsa District

- Location in Nepal
- Coordinates: 27.03°N 84.84°E
- Country: Nepal
- Zone: Narayani Zone
- District: Parsa District

Population (2011)
  - Total: 8,566
- Time zone: UTC+5:45 (Nepal Time)

Alau is a village development committee in Parsa District in the Narayani Zone of southern Nepal. At the time of the 2011 Nepal census it had a population of 8566 people living in 1213 individual households. There were 4433 males and 4133 females at the time of the census. In 2014, it was included in sub-metropolitan city, Birgunj.

Dryport is also located in Alau.
