= 1885 Nepal coup d'état =

Date	22 November 1885
Location	Kathmandu, Nepal
Result	Coup d'état successful: Ranodip Singh Kunwar assassinated; Bir Shumsher becomes the Prime Minister of Nepal

Belligerents
Kingdom of Nepal	Shumshers

Commanders and leaders
Ranodip Singh Kunwar †; Jagat Jang Rana †	Khadga Shumsher; Bhim Shumsher; Bir Shumsher; Dambar Shumsher Rana

The 1885 Nepal coup d'état (Nepali: ४२ सालको पर्व) was a coup d'état led by Khadga Shumsher, Bhim Shumsher, Bir Shumsher, and Dambar Shumsher on 22 November 1885.
