= Jung Bahadur Rana =

Founder of the Rana dynasty in Nepal

- Shree Teen Maharaja
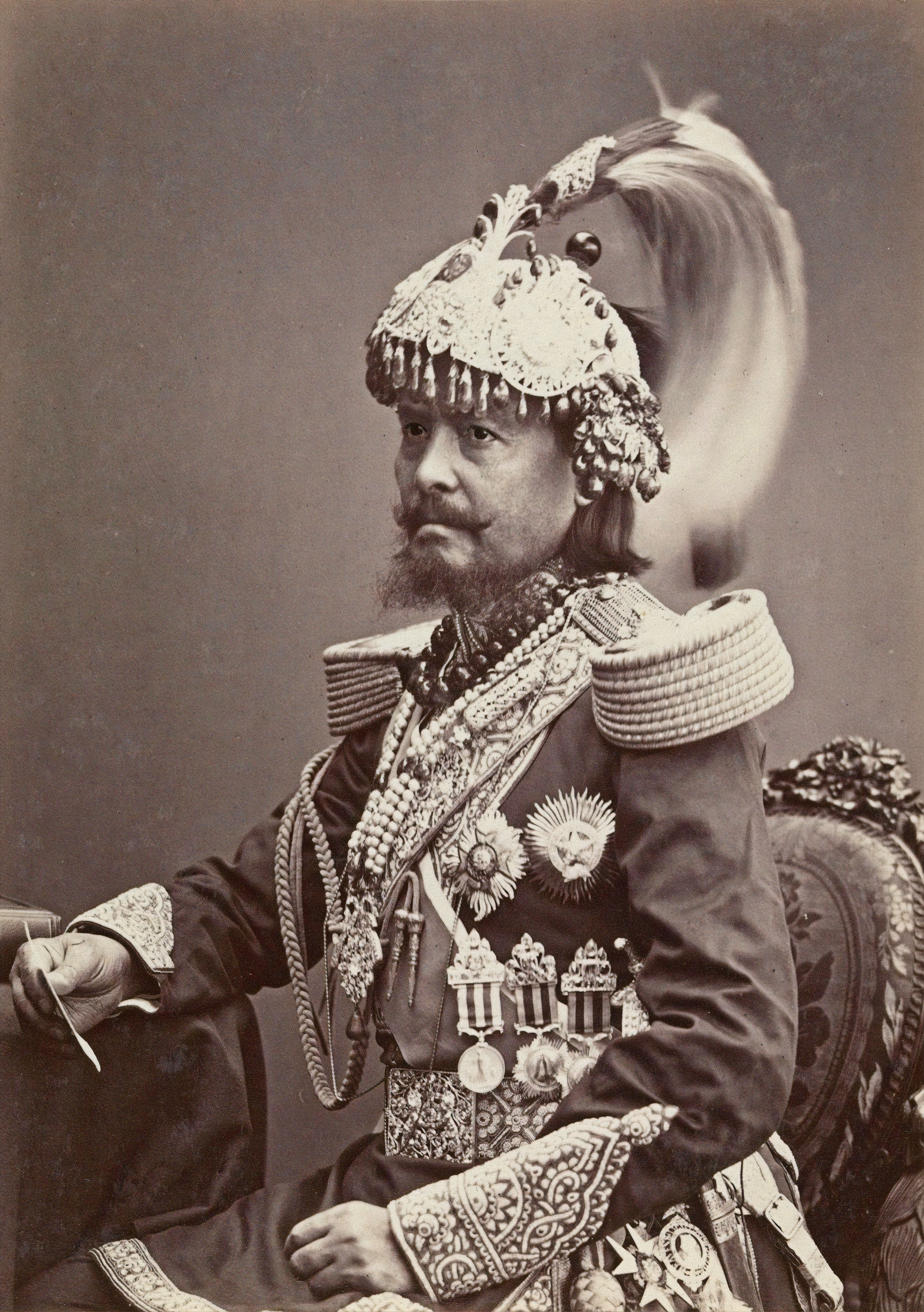
- Formal portrait, c. 1887

Maharaja of Lamjung and Kaski
- Reign: 6 August 1856 – 25 February 1877
- Coronation: 6 August 1856
- Predecessor: Monarchy established
- Successor: Ranodip Singh Rana

Prime Minister of Nepal
- In office 28 June 1857 – 25 February 1877
- Monarch: Surendra Bikram Shah
- Preceded by: Bam Bahadur Rana
- Succeeded by: Ranodip Singh Rana
- In office 15 September 1846 – 1 August 1856
- Monarchs: Rajendra Bikram Shah; Surendra Bikram Shah
- Preceded by: Fateh Jung Shah
- Succeeded by: Bam Bahadur Rana
- Born: 18 June 1817; Balkot, Arghakhanchi, Kingdom of Nepal
- Died: 25 February 1877 (aged 59); Patharghatta, Saptari, Kingdom of Nepal
- Spouses: 40+ spouses, including: Prasad Lakshmi Basnyat; Nanda Kumari Khatri; Hiranya Garbha Devi (m. 1854; d. 1877) Hem Kumari (m. 1855; d. 1877): Misri Maharani; Ganesh Kumari; Bishnu Kumari; Siddhi Gajendra Lakshmi; Ganga Maharani
- Issue: Bhim Jung Rana; Jagat Jung Rana; Jit Jung Rana; Lalit Rajeshwori Rajya Lakshmi Devi; Somgarva Divyeshwari Rajya Lakshmi Devi; Padma Jung Bahadur Rana; Badan Kumari Devi; Tara Rajya Lakshmi Devi
Names
- Bir Narsingh Kunwar
Regnal name
- His Highness GCB GCSI Shree Teen Maharaja Jung Bahadur Rana
- House: Kunwar
- Dynasty: Rana
- Father: Bal Narsingh Kunwar
- Mother: Ganesh Kumari Kunwar
- Religion: Hinduism
- Military career
- Allegiance: Kingdom of Nepal
- Branch: Nepalese Army
- Rank: Commander-in-chief
- Conflicts: See list: Kot Massacre (1846); Bhandarkhal Massacre (1846); Battle of Alau (1847); Third Nepal–Tibet War (1855–1856); Indian Rebellion (1857)

Jung Bahadur Rana, GCB, GCSI, was the Prime Minister of Nepal and the 1st Maharaja of Lamjung and Kaski. He was born Bir Narsingh Kunwar (1817–1877). His mother, Ganesh Kumari, was the daughter of Kaji Nain Singh Thapa, the brother of Mukhtiyar Bhimsen Thapa from the prominent Thapa dynasty of Chhetri clan. During his lifetime, Jung Bahadur eliminated factional fighting at court, removed his family's rivals such as the Pandes and Basnyats, introduced innovations in the bureaucracy and judiciary, and made efforts to modernize Nepal.

He is considered a significant figure in Nepalese history. Some modern historians blame Jung Bahadur for initiating a dark period in Nepalese history marked by an oppressive dictatorship that lasted 104 years, while others attribute this period to his nephews, the Shumsher Ranas. Rana's rule is often associated with tyranny, debauchery, economic exploitation, and religious persecution.

His original name was Bir Narsingh Kunwar, but he was commonly known as Jung Bahadur, a name given to him by his maternal uncle, Mathabar Singh Thapa.

== Early life and family ==
=== Birth ===
Jung Bahadur was born on 18 June 1817 in Balkot, southern Nepal. He was the son of Bal Narsingh Kunwar, a bodyguard of King Rana Bahadur Shah, and his second wife, Ganesh Kumari.

=== Family ===
Jung Bahadur was a descendant of Kaji Ranajit Kunwar and Sardar Ram Krishna Kunwar, both prominent military figures under King Prithvi Narayan Shah. He also had familial connections to the Thapa dynasty with Mukhtiyar Bhimsen Thapa through his mother, Ganesh Kumari, and to the aristocratic Pande family through his maternal grandmother, Rana Kumari, who was the daughter of Kaji Ranajit Pande, a prominent royal courtier.

Bal Narsingh witnessed Sher Bahadur Shah, the king's half-brother, commit regicide in front of the court. In response, Bal Narsingh promptly executed Sher Bahadur. For this action, he was rewarded with the hereditary position of Kaji. As a result, the court granted Bal Narsingh exclusive permission to possess weapons within its premises.

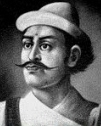
Ram Krishna Kunwar; Jung Bahadur's great-grandfather

Rana's mother, Ganesh Kumari, was the sister of Mathabarsingh Thapa. In 1833, Bal Narsingh moved to Dadeldhura in Western Nepal and enrolled Jung Bahadur in the military. By the time Bal Narsingh relocated to Jumla in 1835, Jung Bahadur had already been promoted to the rank of second lieutenant. During this period, the Thapas held significant influence over the administration of Nepal. However, when Bhimsen Thapa was dismissed in 1837, all his relatives, including Bal Narsingh and Jung Bahadur, were also dismissed from their positions and had their properties seized. In search of work, Jung Bahadur went to Varanasi but returned to Terai after a brief period to work as a Mahout. He then moved to Kathmandu in 1839, where his wife and infant son had already died.

== Rise ==
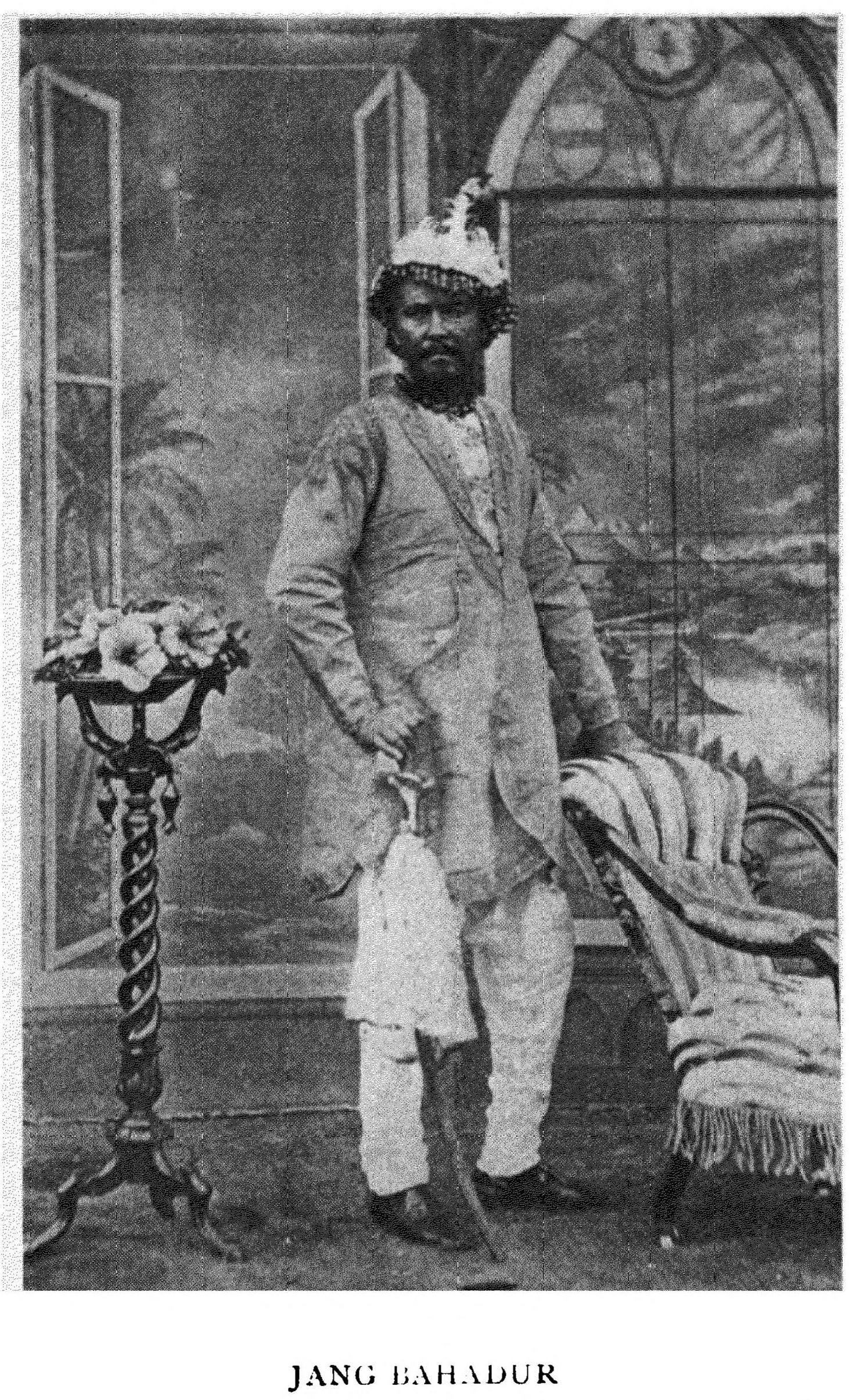
Jung Bahadur

In 1839, Jung Bahadur married the sister of Colonel Sanak Singh Shripali Tandon. The dowry from this marriage improved his financial situation. In 1840, King Rajendra traveled to Terai, where he coincidentally encountered the royal family. Jung Bahadur impressed the king with his audacious display. Pleased with his performance, the king promoted him to the rank of captain. The Crown Prince then recruited Jung Bahadur as one of his personal protectors. According to legend, Jung Bahadur leaped into the Trishuli River while riding a horse, following the Prince's orders.

After some time, Jung Bahadur was transferred from the prince's group back to the king's. He was appointed as a Kaji and assigned to the office of Kumarichowk. This position provided him with the opportunity to gain a thorough understanding of Nepal's financial transactions.

Jung Bahadur was known for his ambition. During that time, the youngest queen was the actual ruler of the country, with the king serving only a nominal role. Gagan Singh Khawas was the closest to the queen. Jung Bahadur successfully won the favor of the queen, the prince, and the prime minister through his diligent efforts. He also managed to influence Henry Lawrence and his wife, Honoria Lawrence.

When Mathabar Singh Thapa was still prime minister, a cousin of Jung Bahadur was sentenced to death. Jung Bahadur had requested Mathabar to persuade the queen to pardon his cousin, but Mathabar refused. This refusal led Jung Bahadur to harbor a grudge against him. Jung Bahadur then befriended Pandit Bijayaraj, the internal priest of the palace, and began to gain valuable information about the Durbar. He also managed to befriend Gagan Singh Khawas.

After assassinating Mathabar Singh Thapa, the queen promoted Jung Bahadur to the rank of General and included Gagan Singh in the council of ministers.

== Kot massacre ==
The Kot massacre took place on 14 September 1846, when Jung Bahadur Rana and his brothers killed about 40 members of the Nepalese palace court, including the Prime Minister and relative of the king, Chautariya Fateh Jung Shah, at the palace armory, known as the Kot, in Kathmandu. This event rendered King Rajendra Bikram Shah and Surendra Bikram Shah powerless and marked the beginning of the Rana autocracy.

By 1850, Jung Bahadur had defeated his main rivals, installed his own candidate on the throne, appointed his brothers and friends to significant positions, and ensured that he was the prime minister responsible for all important administrative decisions.

== Prime minister ==
After the massacre, on 15 September, the queen appointed Jung Bahadur as prime minister and Commander-in-chief. Following meetings with the queen and the king, Jung Bahadur visited the British residency to inform the resident about the massacre and assure him that the new government would maintain good relations with the British. On 23 September, all military and bureaucratic officers were ordered to report to their respective offices within 10 days. Subsequently, Jung Bahadur appointed his brothers and nephews to the highest ranks of the government.

=== Bhandarkhal massacre ===
The queen ordered Jung Bahadur to remove Prince Surendra from his position and declare Ranendra as the new prince, but Jung Bahadur ignored this command, leading the queen to hold a grudge against him. Some survivors of the Kot Massacre were secretly planning to take revenge on Jung Bahadur. The queen secretly contacted them and conspired to assassinate him. A plan was devised to carry out the assassination during a gathering to be held in the garden of Bhandarkhal, located at the eastern end of the palace.

Jung Bahadur had already stationed his spies inside the palace to gather information about the queen and events within the palace. These spies were responsible for secretly informing him about developments. A certain Putali Nani, whom Jung Bahadur had also recruited, worked inside the palace and informed him about the conspiracy.

After receiving a command from the Rawal Queen to come to Bhandarkhal, Jung Bahadur took his fully armed troops and proceeded towards the garden. Birdhwaj was assigned the task of ensuring Jung Bahadur arrived on time. When Birdhwaj reached the Jor-Ganesh temple, he saw Jung Bahadur approaching with his troops. Upon sighting him, Jung Bahadur signaled Capt. Ranamehar, who then killed Birdhwaj Basnyat. The troops continued to Bhandarkhal, and upon seeing Jung Bahadur and his fully armed troops, the conspirators began to flee. Twenty-three people were killed in the massacre, and fifteen escaped. The next day, all property of those involved in the massacre was seized. Jung Bahadur then imprisoned the queen and convened a council meeting in the name of King Rajendra, charging the queen with attempting to assassinate the prince and the prime minister. The council agreed to strip the queen of her rights. The queen requested permission to go to Benaras (Varanasi) with her family, which Jung Bahadur granted. The king accompanied the queen.

=== Battle of Alau ===
After the massacres at Kot and Bhandarkhal, the Thapas, Pandes, and other citizens had settled in Benaras. Similarly, some had moved to Nautanwa and Bettiah. Guru Prasad Shah of Palpa also went to live with the King of Bettiah. Upon learning of the king and queen's presence in Benaras, Guru Prasad went there and began gathering an army with the aim of overthrowing Jung Bahadur. After staying in Benaras for about two months, King Rajendra expressed interest in the conspiracy. He met with Guru Prasad, assured him of his support, and provided financial aid. With this support, Guru Prasad began organizing the Nepalese expatriates, gathering those who had come in search of work and starting their training.

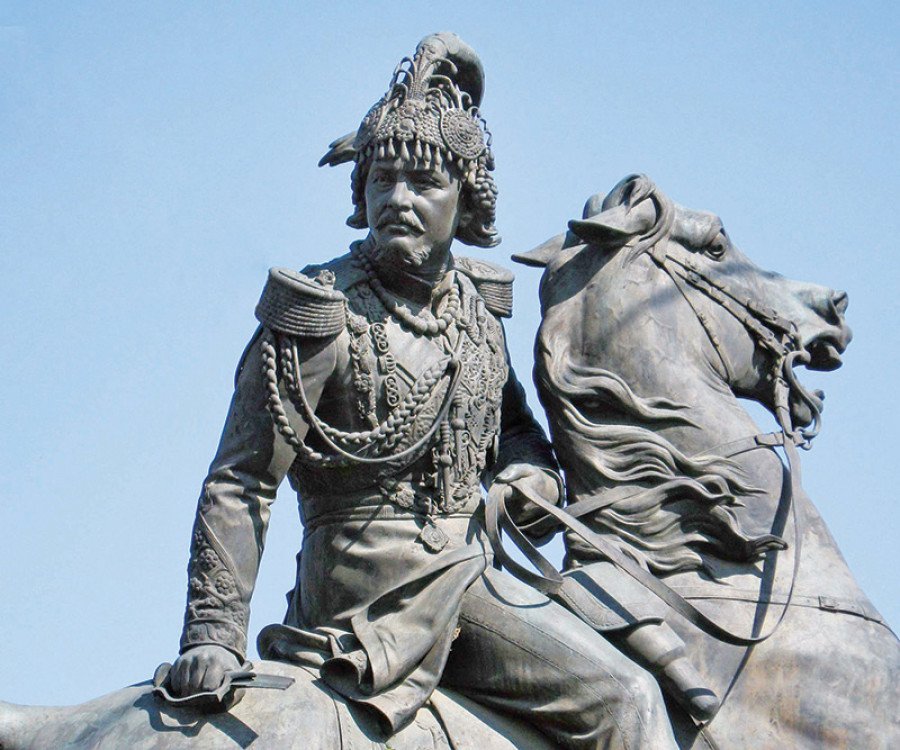
Jung Bahadur Statue in Tundikhel, Kathmandu

Meanwhile, the spies in Benaras, who were monitoring every move of the king, provided weekly reports to Jung Bahadur. Understanding the activities in Benaras, Jung Bahadur called a meeting of the council and issued a charter stating, "We can no longer obey the king; henceforth, we will act in accordance with the commands of Prime Minister Jung Bahadur," which he sent to Benaras. Upon receiving this letter, the king panicked and consulted with his new ministers as well as his guru.

The guru and others advised the king to send a letter to the army stating that the troops should support the king, not the prime minister. The king stamped the letter and sent it with Kumbhedan and Sewakram. They secretly arrived in Kathmandu and stayed at the house of a landowner in Killagal. Jung Bahadur's spies captured them from the house and destroyed it the next morning. A pistol and a letter were found with them. They were immediately imprisoned and, after a few days, were executed by hanging.

On 12 May 1847, Jung Bahadur gave a speech in Tudikhel, accusing the king of attempting to assassinate the prince and the prime minister. The Council then decided to dethrone King Rajendra, deeming him mentally ill, and on the same day, Surendra was crowned as the new king of Nepal.

Upon hearing the news of Surendra's coronation, Rajendra decided to take on the responsibility of removing Jung Bahadur and declared himself the leader of the army. He then left Benaras and appointed Guru Prasad Shah as the Chief of the Army for the operation to remove Jung Bahadur Rana from Nepal. Rajendra began to accumulate weapons and train troops at the camp of the King of Bettiah, a trusted ally. Additionally, treasure and weapons were purchased from secret groups in Benaras, Prayag, and other locations, and sent to Bettiah. The King of Bettiah also provided arms and a few elephants. A plan to attack Nepal was formulated.

Antagonism from the Company forced Rajendra and his troops to enter Nepal. On 23 July, the troops arrived at a village called Alau in Parsa and set up camp there. The number of troops in Alau was around three thousand, which was a thousand less than the number at Bettiah due to many deserters who had fled along the way.

A spy group from the Government of Nepal was closely monitoring the activities of the rebel groups in Bettiah. They reported the developments to Jung Bahadur, who immediately sent a troop led by Sanak Singh Tandon to Alau. Their mission was to suppress the rebellion, arrest Rajendra, and bring him to Kathmandu. On 27 July, the Gorakhnath Paltan arrived and camped in a village called Simraungadh, not far from Alau.

At dawn the next day, the troops from Kathmandu began firing cannons at the camp, causing widespread panic. Only a few soldiers from the king's side resisted and fought against the government forces. The former king also led his troops for a period, but Guru Prasad fled the location. Around a hundred soldiers of the king were killed in the battle, and the king was captured and brought to Kathmandu.

The Battle of Alau was a decisive conflict between the forces of the king and Jung Bahadur. The king suffered a significant defeat in the battle. The victory at Alau helped Jung Bahadur solidify his dictatorship. Rajendra was imprisoned in an old palace in Bhaktapur.

=== Visit to Bisauli ===
Towards the end of 1848, a fierce battle erupted between the British and the Sikhs in Punjab. Upon hearing the news, Jung Bahadur met with the Resident and assured him of the Nepal Government's support for the British. However, the Governor-General rejected the proposal, fearing that the Nepali troops might side with the Sikhs. To demonstrate his power to the British, Jung Bahadur decided to make a show of force. Although he was passionate about hunting, he had not had an opportunity to hunt since becoming prime minister. In 1848, Jung Bahadur planned a trip to the Terai with two objectives: hunting and showcasing his power to the British. On 22 December, he departed Kathmandu with the king and a large entourage, including thirty-two thousand foot soldiers, fifty-two cannons, three hundred risalla, and two hundred and fifty mules. Upon learning of this large force approaching its boundaries, the Governor-General sent a message to the Resident to verify the situation.

The king and Jung Bahadur then camped in a village called Bisauli, which was not far from the company's territories. However, the spread of cholera and malaria, which began killing the soldiers, forced them to return.

=== Europe ===
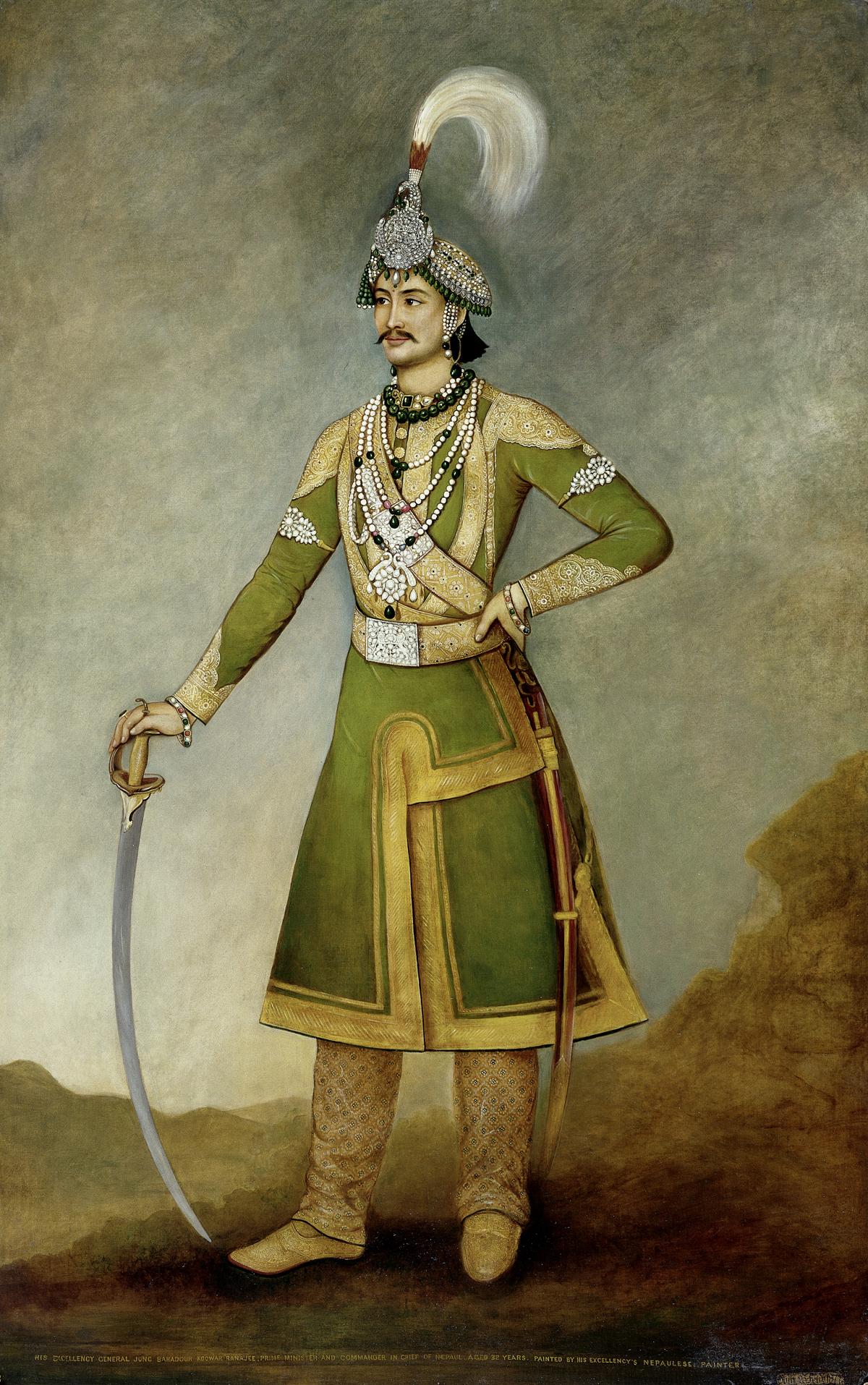
Portrait by Bhajuman Chitrakar, 1849. Given to the East India Company by the sitter in 1850, in London. It later hung in the office of the Foreign Secretary until removed by Jack Straw, & allocated to the British Library, where it remains

After the Treaty of Sugauli, the British gained access to Nepal's internal affairs. While previous prime ministers of Nepal had somewhat resisted the Resident's involvement, Jung Bahadur strongly believed that neither the Resident nor the Governor-General should have any direct involvement in Nepalese matters. He sought to establish a direct relationship between the Government of Nepal and the Queen and Prime Minister of Great Britain. Additionally, he was keen to understand the true extent of British power and, for these reasons, wished to travel to Great Britain.

Jung Bahadur expressed his desire to the then Resident, Colonel Thorsby. Thorsby suggested that Jung Bahadur write a letter, which he did, and sent it to Calcutta. The Governor-General forwarded the message to Britain, where the request was accepted. The British also asked the Governor-General to arrange the necessary provisions. Subsequently, James Broun-Ramsay, sent a letter of acceptance to Kathmandu. The visit was to be diplomatic in nature, with Jung Bahadur visiting as a Royal Ambassador.

After appointing his brother, Bam Bahadur Kunwar, as interim prime minister, and Badri Narsingh as interim Commander-in-Chief, Jung Bahadur left Kathmandu for Calcutta on 15 January. During his stay in Calcutta, he met with Lord and Lady Dalhousie and participated in a royal program. He also visited the Jagannath Temple. On 7 April, the Nepalese delegation departed Calcutta on the P&O Haddington. The ship traveled through Madras, Sri Lanka, and Aden before reaching the Suez Canal.

In Egypt, Jung Bahadur and his team visited Cairo and Alexandria, where he met with Abbas Helmi. On 15 May 1850, the team arrived in Southampton.

In Britain, Jung Bahadur met and discussed various topics with Sir John Hubhouse, the chairman of the Board of Trade, the Duke of Wellington, and others. On 19 June, Jung Bahadur and Queen Victoria met at a program organized in the Royal Palace. He also visited Parliament, closely observing the workings of the House of Commons and the British system. During his visit, he met with ministers and dukes, and proposed a direct relationship between Britain and Nepal, which the British government rejected.

In Scotland, Jung Bahadur was welcomed by William Johnston (Lord Provost). During his visit, he toured various forts and industries.

On 21 August 1850, Jung Bahadur and his team departed for France. There, he met with the then president of France. In France, he expressed his desire to establish a direct relationship between Nepal and France, but the French president insisted that such a relationship be formed through the British embassy, as there was no direct diplomatic connection between the two countries. Jung Bahadur and his team stayed in France for about six weeks. They departed from Paris on 3 October and arrived in Bombay on 6 November.

In India, he married an Indian woman.

During his visits, he attempted unsuccessfully to engage directly with the British government. However, the main outcome of the tour was a positive development in the British-Nepal relationship. Recognizing the power of industrialized Europe, he became convinced that close cooperation with the British was the best way to ensure Nepal's independence.

On 29 January 1851, Jung Bahadur returned to Nepal.

=== Muluki Ain ===
Jung Bahadur was impressed by the rule of law, the Parliament, and the democratic system in Britain. In Nepal, there were no written laws, and different types of punishment were often given for similar crimes. Realizing that the existing system would not be beneficial in the long run, Jung Bahadur established a Kausal Adda to work on drafting legal codes. He selected around two hundred members for the Adda and instructed them to draft legal codes as soon as possible.

The Adda began its work by carefully studying the traditions, castes, races, classes, and religious situation of Nepal. Some members also examined the Hindu Ain used in the English courts under the company. After three years of rigorous research, a detailed Act was prepared. This Act covered court procedures, the system of punishment, and various administrative sections. However, it did not address the issue of caste inequality, as a progressive policy on this matter could have led to protests and turmoil in Nepalese society.

On 6 January 1854, the Muluki Ain was enacted in Nepal. This Act clarified confusions concerning religious laws and ensured that decisions on cases were made in a timely manner.

With the Muluki Ain, Jung Bahadur established the foundation of modern law in Nepal.

== Foreign relations ==
Jung Bahadur as ambassador

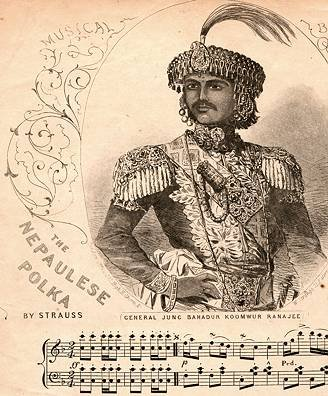
Maharaja Jung Bahadur at London in 1850

During the reign of Jung Bahadur Rana, Nepal began to experience some success in international affairs.

In 1859, Begum Hazrat Mahal of Awadh took refuge in Kathmandu with her 10-year-old son, Birjis Qadr, and some loyal staff. The then Prime Minister of Nepal, Jung Bahadur Rana, provided her with shelter at the palace in Thapathali, which now houses an office of the Nepal Rastra Bank (Thapathali Durbar), according to Samim Miya Ansari. Jung Bahadur Rana took this step despite being on good terms with the British at the time.

The Sikh Empire's last regent, Maharani Jind Kaur, was also given asylum in Nepal by Jung Bahadur after she escaped from a British prison and reached Kathmandu. The Nepalese government built a new residence, Chaburja Darbar, for her and provided an allowance. The British Resident in Kathmandu kept a close watch on her, suspecting she might still be planning to revive the Sikh dynasty. She lived in Nepal for 11 years.

In 1850, Jung Bahadur visited Europe to establish direct diplomatic relations with the British government, though he was unsuccessful. Nevertheless, the tour diplomatically strengthened Nepal and ensured its territorial integrity, as he met influential figures such as Queen Victoria and the President of France. The main outcome of the tour was a positive development in Anglo-Nepalese relations.

== Rana Dynasty ==
Jung Bahadur Rana, and later prime ministers from his family added his name to their own in honor of his accomplishments. The Rana dynasty ruled Nepal from 1848 until 1951 and is historically known for its iron-fisted rule. Jung Bahadur remained prime minister until 1877, suppressing conspiracies and local revolts while enjoying the fruits of his early successes.

== Honours and titles ==
=== Titles ===
- 1817–1835: Jung Bahadur Kunwar
- 1835–1840: Second Lieutenant Jung Bahadur Kunwar
- 1840–1841: Captain Jung Bahadur Kunwar
- 1841–1845: Kaji Captain Jung Bahadur Kunwar
- 1845–1848: Kaji Major-General Jung Bahadur Kunwar
- 1848–1856: Kaji Major-General Jung Bahadur Kunwar Rana
- 1856–1857: Kaji Commanding-General Jung Bahadur Kunwar Rana, Maharaja of Lamjang and Kaski
- 1857–1858: His Highness Commanding-General Shree Shree Shree Maharaja Jung Bahadur Kunwar Rana, Maharaja of Lamjung and Kaski
- 1858–1872: His Highness Commanding-General Shree Shree Shree Maharaja Sir Jung Bahadur Kunwar Rana, Maharaja of Lamjang and Kaski, GCB
- 1872–1873: His Highness Commanding-General Shree Shree Shree Maharaja Sir Jung Bahadur Kunwar Rana, T'ung-ling-ping-ma-Kuo-Kang-wang, Maharaja of Lamjang and Kaski, GCB
- 1873–1877: His Highness Commanding-General Shree Shree Shree Maharaja Sir Jung Bahadur Kunwar Rana, T'ung-ling-ping-ma-Kuo-Kang-wang, Maharaja of Lamjang and Kaski, Shree Tin Maharajah of Nepal, GCB, GCSI

=== Honours ===
- France: Sword of Honour from Napoleon III, 1851
- East India Company: India General Service Medal, 1854
- United Kingdom: Knight Grand Cross of the Order of the Bath, 1858
- East India Company: Indian Mutiny Medal, 1858
- United Kingdom: Knight Grand Commander of the Order of the Star of India, 1873
- Prince of Wales' Medal, 1876

== Ancestry ==
Ancestors of Jung Bahadur Rana

16. Ahirama Kunwar
8. Ram Krishna Kunwar
4. Ranajit Kunwar
2. Bal Narsingh Kunwar
1. ‘’’Jung Bahadur Kunwar / Rana’’’
24. Bir Bhadra Thapa
12. Amar Singh Thapa (sanukaji)
6. Nain Singh Thapa
13. Satyarupa Maya
3. Ganesh Kumari Thapa
28. Tularam Pande
14. Ranajit Pande
7. Rana Kumari Pande

== Film depictions ==
- Basanti (2000 film), where he was portrayed by Neeraj Thapa
- Seto Bagh, where he was portrayed by Bedendra Shamsher Jang Bahadur Rana popularly known as B.S. Rana

== Gallery ==
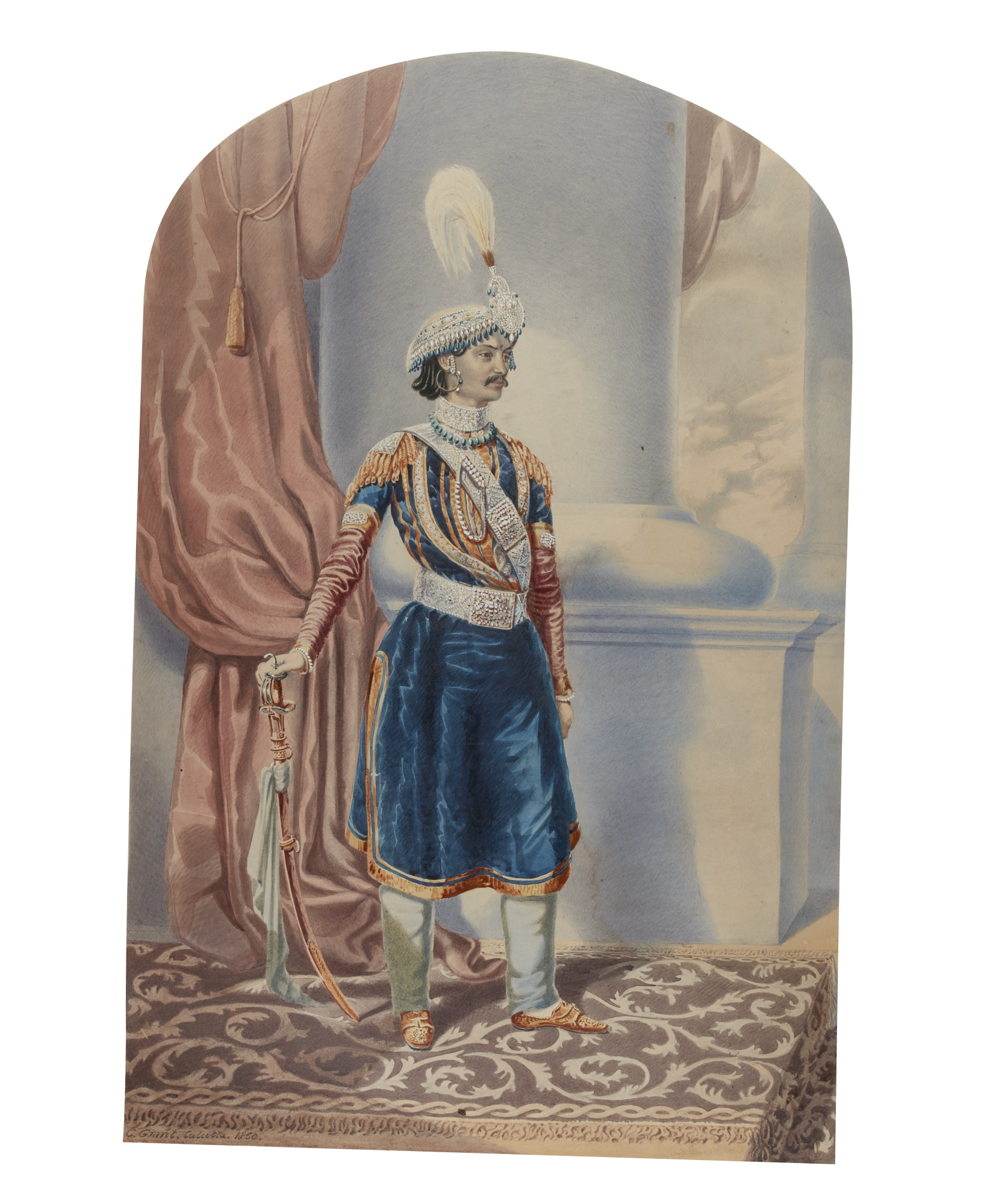
Jung Bahadur Rana in Calcutta, 1850

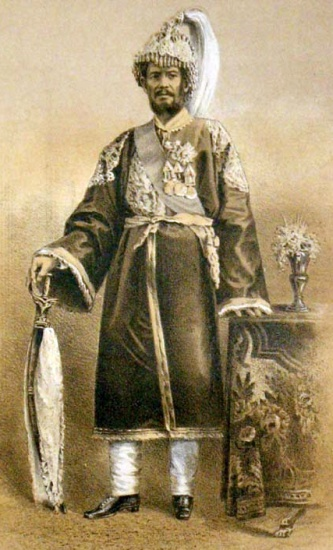
Jung Bahadur Rana

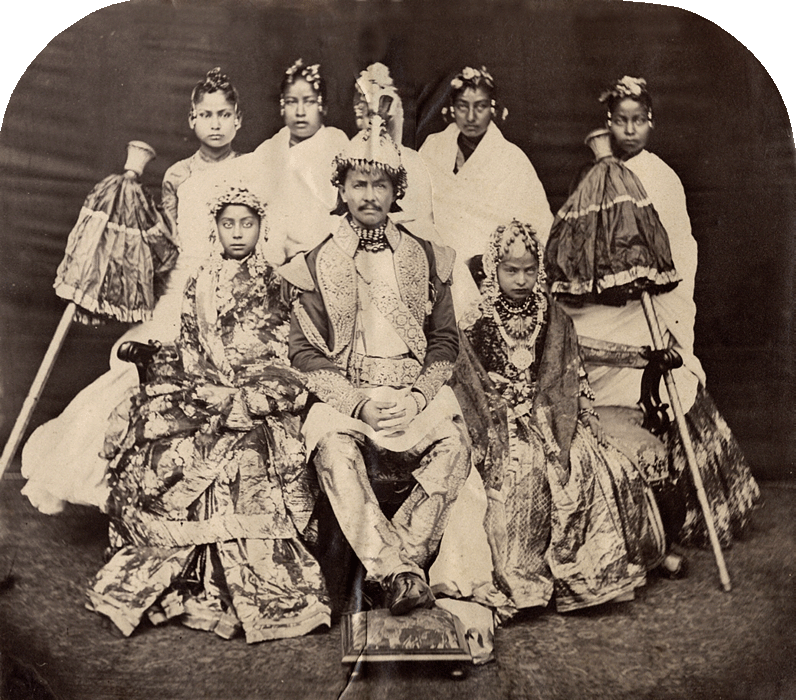
Jung Bahadur with his two daughters, and slave girls standing behind them, 1863

Jung Bahadur with his sons, Jagat Jung and Jeet Jung

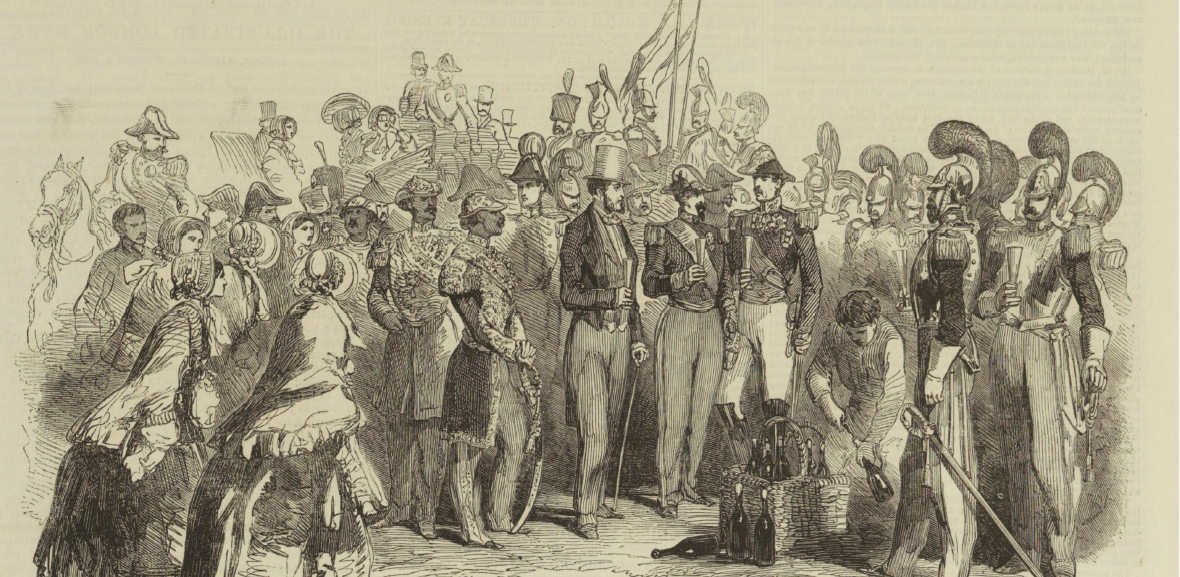
Jung Bahadur Rana in Paris, 1850

== See also ==
- Equestrian statue of Jung Bahadur Rana (ne)

Jung Bahadur Rana Rana Dynasty Born: 18 June 1817 Died: 25 February 1877
Regnal titles
Preceded by New creation	Maharaja of Lamjang and Kaski; 1856–1877	Succeeded by Ranodip Singh Kunwar
