= Jagat Jung Rana =

19th century Nepalese politician, the eldest son of Jung Bahadur Rana

Commanding-General Shree Shree Shree Maharajkumar Jagat Jung Kunwar Rana
- श्री श्री श्री महाराजकुमार जर्नेल जगतजङ्ग कुँवर राणा
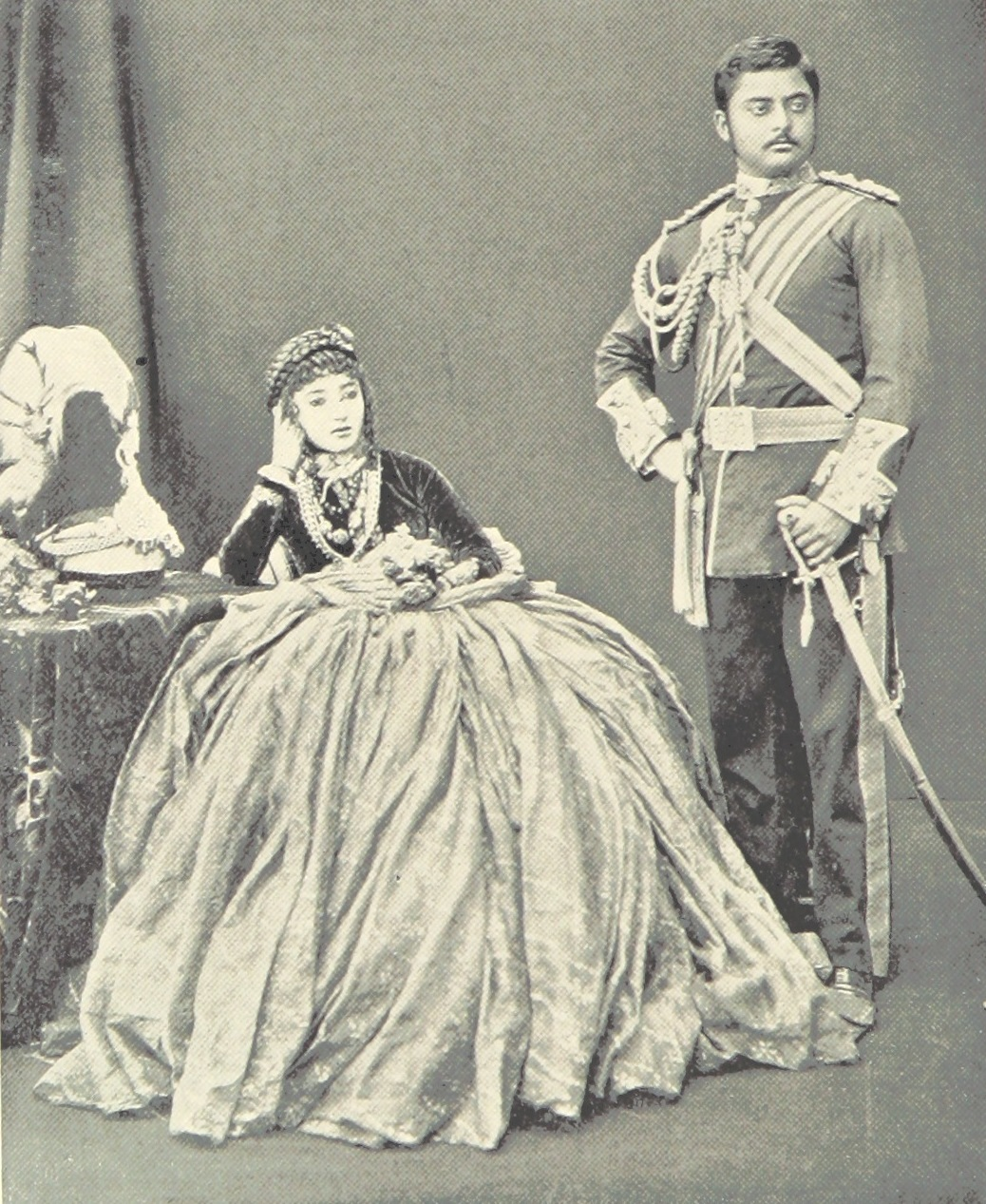
- Jagat Jang Kunwar Rana, eldest son of Jang Bahadur

Personal details
- Born: 1 March 1848 Kathmandu, Kingdom of Nepal
- Died: 22 November 1885 (aged 37) Manohara Darbar, Kathmandu, Kingdom of Nepal
- Spouse(s): Tika Rajya Lakshmi Devi (first wife) a daughter of Raja Sheoraj Singh of Kashipur India (second wife)
- Children: Yuddha Pratap Jung Rana (a.k.a. Naati Jarnel)
- Parents: Jung Bahadur Rana (father); Nanda Kumari Khatri - sister of commander colonel Sanak Singh Khatri (mother)
- Relatives: see Kunwar family; see Rana dynasty; see Thapa dynasty; see Pande dynasty

Military service
- Allegiance: Nepal
- Rank: Commanding General

Jagat Jung Kunwar Rana, popularly known as Jagat Jung Rana (Nepali: जगतजङ्ग राणा) was a Nepalese politician, military officer and courtier in the Kingdom of Nepal. He was the eldest son of the founder of Rana dynasty, Jung Bahadur Kunwar Rana. He claimed the Premiership of Kingdom of Nepal and the throne of Maharaja of Lamjung and Kaski against the traditional agnatic succession of the Rana dynasty. Driven by this motive, he attempted a coup against his uncles; Maharaja Prime Minister Ranodip Singh Kunwar and Commander-In-Chief Dhir Shamsher Kunwar Rana in the winter of 1881–1882. He was immediately thrown out of the roles of succession among Ranas. Later, he was pardoned and was impeased by Ranodip Singh as his successor after the death of Dhir Shamsher, which caused envy among his Shamsher cousins and ultimately led to his death in the 1885 Shamsher coup.

== Early life ==
He was born at Kathmandu on 1 March 1848 as the second son of Jung Bahadur Rana with his second wife. In 1839, Jung Bahadur's first infant son had already died, thus, he was referred as the eldest son of Jung Bahadur Rana.

== Career ==
Jagat Jung Rana (seated) in military undress, with a Nepalese army officer in ordinary summer-dress.

=== Feud at father's funeral ===
Jagat Jung and Crown Prince Trailokya of Nepal plotted to force King Surendra of Nepal to abdicate the throne and appoint Jagat Jung as the Prime Minister of Nepal after the death of Jagat Jung's father, Jung Bahadur. Jung Bahadur died on Falgun 1933 V.S. (March 1877) at Rautahat. (Note: However, as per historians Bhuwan Joshi and Leo E. Rose, Jung Bahadur died in February 1877.) Dhir Shamsher Rana circulated a rumour that his brother Jung Bahadur was critically ill, upon which Jagat Jung and Crown Prince Trailokya rushed to Patharghatta. During their absence in Kathmandu, Dhir Shamsher immediately imposed King Surendra to declare Ranodip Singh Kunwar as Prime Minister of Nepal and destroyed the plot of Jagat Jung and the Crown Prince. Afterwards Jagat Jung and Prince Trailokya came back to Kathmandu after the funeral, they began to overthrow Jagat Jung's uncle Dhir Shamsher from the political scenario of Nepal.

=== Coup attempt of 1938 (1881–82) ===
When Commander-In-Chief of the Nepalese Army, Jagat Shamsher Kunwar Rana, died in 1879, Dhir Shamsher succeeded him but did not intend to transfer his current position of Senior Commanding-General of Western Commanding forces to his nephew Jagat Jung because the forces under Western Command were huge. This event further incensed the relationship of Jagat Jung with his uncle Dhir Shamsher. The faction of Bharadars against Ranodip Singh and Dhir Shamsher led by Crown Prince Trailokya and Jagat Jung, attempted coup d'état twice in the year 1938 Vikram Samvat (1881–1882 CE) against both the Prime Minister Ranodip Singh and the Army Chief Dhir Shamsher. Both attempts were aborted, and for the third attempt, the date of execution was fixed on last day of Poush (14 December 1881) when Ranodip Singh went on a hunting trip to Terai. The conspirating faction sought the assistance of Lieutenant Uttardhwaj (Note: Historians Bhuwan Joshi and Leo E. Rose as well as Historian Ishwari Prasad referred the whistleblower as grandson of Gagan Singh.) who had ancestral rivalry with the Shrivikram Singh Thapa, a member of the conspirator group due to which, Lt. Uttardhwaj revealed the plot to Dhir Shamsher who was in Kathmandu and the conspiracy was immediately informed to the entouring Prime Minister Ranodip Singh. Bambir Bikram Rana, Sangramsur Bisht and Amrit Simha Adhikari, members of conspirating faction, revealed the conspiracy. Jagat Jung and Bambir Bikram Rana were removed out of the roles of succession of Ranas.

=== Coup of 1942 (1885) ===
Dhir Shamsher died on 14 October 1884. After his death, Maharaja Ranodip Singh called his estranged nephew Jagat Jung and began to impease him. All faction of Ranas knew that Jagat Jung would murder and destroy the Shamsher family if he succeeds the uncle Maharaja Ranodip Singh. The insecurity of sons of Dhir Shamsher (Shamsher faction) escalated due to impeasement of Jagat Jung by Ranodip Singh and they were against this recent uprising of Jagat Jung. Finally, they overpowered their cousins and conducted the 1885 Shamsher coup. In the coup, Prime Minister Ranodip Singh Kunwar and Jagat Jung were killed. By the coup of 1885, Shamsher brothers established the "rule of seventeen brothers" and a new era in Nepal.

== Ancestry ==
Ancestors of Jagat Jung Rana

16. Ram Krishna Kunwar
8. Ranajit Kunwar
4. Bal Narsingh Kunwar
2. Jung Bahadur Kunwar Rana
20. Amar Singh Thapa (sanukaji)
10. Nain Singh Thapa
21. Satyarupa Maya
5. Ganesh Kumari Thapa
22. Ranajit Pande
11. Rana Kumari Pande
1. Jagat Jung Rana

== Books ==
- Acharya, Baburam (1 May 1974) [1972], "The 1882 IncidentsX" (PDF), Regmi Research Series, 6 (5): 91–94
- Acharya, Baburam (2019). Acharya, Shrikrishna (ed.). Aba Yasto Kahilyai Nahos (in Nepali). Kathmandu: Fine Print Books. ISBN 978-9937-665-40-7.
- Whelpton, John (2005). A History of Nepal. Cambridge University Press. ISBN 978-0521804707.
- Adhikari, Indra (2015), Military and Democracy in Nepal, Routledge, ISBN 9781317589068
- Prasad, Ishwari (1 January 1996). The Life and Times of Maharaja Juddha Shumsher Jung Bahadur Rana of Nepal. APH Publishing. ISBN 978-81-7024-756-2.
- Shaha, Rishikesh (1990), Modern Nepal 1769–1885, Riverdale Company, ISBN 0-913215-64-3
- Joshi, Bhuwan Lal; Rose, Leo E. (1966), Democratic Innovations in Nepal: A Case Study of Political Acculturation, University of California Press
- Rose, Leo E. (1971). Nepal; strategy for survival. University of California Press. ISBN 9780520016439.
- Tribhuvan University (1978). Voice of History. Vol. 4–6. Kirtipur: Tribhuvan University.
- Kumar, Satish (1967). Rana polity in Nepal; origin and growth. Asia Pub. House.
- Singh, Nagendra Kr (1997). Nepal: Refugee to Ruler: A Militant Race of Nepal. APH Publishing. p. 125. ISBN 9788170248477.
- Tyagi, Sushila (1974). Indo-Nepalese Relations: (1858 - 1914). India: Concept Publishing Company.
- Adhikari, Krishna Kant (1984), Nepal Under Jang Bahadur, 1846–1877, vol. 1, Nepal: Buku, ISBN 9788180698132
