= Ranodip Singh Kunwar =

Prime Minister of Nepal from 1877 to 1885

His Excellency Commanding General Shree Shree Shree Maharaja Sir Ranaudip Singh Bahadur Kunwar Ranaji, KCSI
- महाराजा रणोद्दिप सिंह बहादुर कुँवर राणाजी
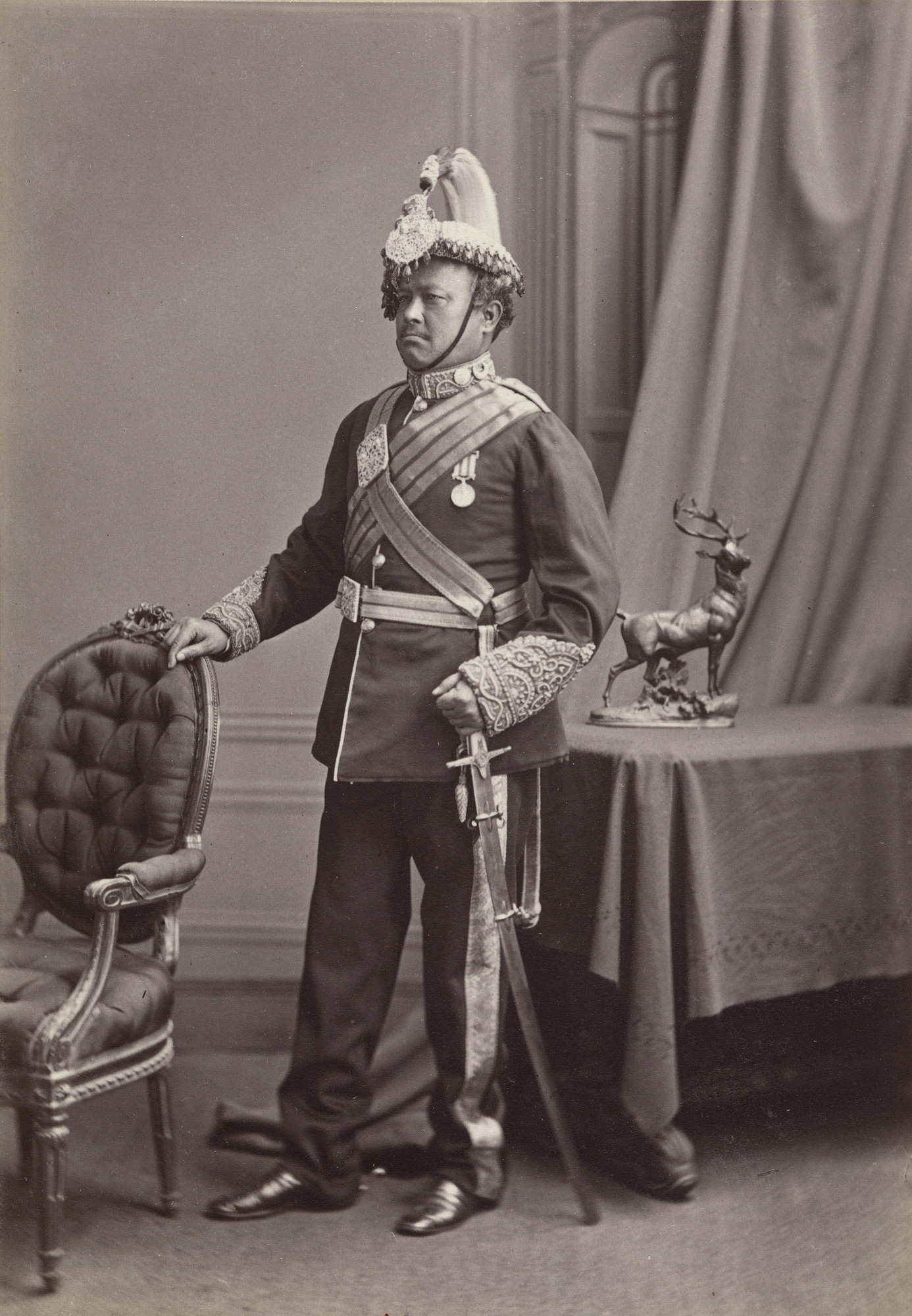

Prime Minister of Nepal
- In office 27 February 1877 – 22 November 1885
- Monarchs: King Surendra; King Prithvi
- Preceded by: Jung Bahadur Rana
- Succeeded by: Bir Shumsher JBR

Personal details
- Born: 3 April 1825 Kingdom of Nepal
- Died: 22 November 1885 (age 60) Kathmandu, Kingdom of Nepal
- Cause of death: Assassination
- Spouse: Hari Priya Devi
- Relatives: Mathabarsingh Thapa (maternal uncle); Nain Singh Thapa (maternal grandfather)

Shree Ranoddip Singh Bahadur Kunwar Ranaji श्री महाराज रणोद्दिप सिंह बहादुर कुँवर राणाजी
- King of Lamjung and Kaski Kingdom; His Highness Commanding General; Svasti Sri Madati Prachandra Bhujadandyetyadi; Sri Sri Sri Maharaja; T'ung-ling-ping-ma-Kuo-Kang-Wang; Knight Commander of the Order of the Star of India
- Reign: 16 March 1877 – 22 November 1885
- Coronation: 16 March 1877
- Predecessor: Jung Bahadur Rana
- Successor: Bir Shumsher Jung Bahadur Rana
- Born: 3 April 1825
- Died: 22 November 1885 (aged 60)
- Spouse: Hari Priya Devi
- Issue: childless
Names
- Ranaudip Singh Bahadur Kunwar Ranaji
- Dynasty: Rana dynasty
- Father: Bal Narsingh Kunwar
- Mother: Ganesh Kumari Thapa (Thapa dynasty)
- Religion: Hinduism

Ranaudip Singh Bahadur Kunwar Ranaji (alternatively spelled Rana Uddip, Renaudip or Ranoddip), KCSI (3 April 1825 – 22 November 1885), commonly known as Ranodip Singh Kunwar (Nepali: रणोद्दिप सिंह कुँवर) was the second Prime Minister of Nepal from the Rana dynasty. His style was His Excellency Commanding General Shree Shree Shree Maharaja Sir.

Deeply pious, Ranodip Singh composed several devotional hymns and was granted a personal salute of 15 guns from the British in 1883 and the title of Tung-ling-ping-ma-kuo-kang-wang (Truly Valiant Prince; commander of foot and horse) from the Guangxu Emperor in 1882. He was born as seventh son of Kaji Bal Narsingh Kunwar from his second wife Ganesh Kumari Thapa, daughter of Thapa Kazi General Nain Singh Thapa.

== Succession ==
As per the family roll of succession, Ranodip Singh succeeded his elder brother Jang Bahadur following his death in 1877.

== Coup and assassination ==
=== Failed coup attempt of 1882 ===
Chautariya Colonel Ambar Bikram Shah (son of General H.E. Sri Chautaria Pushkar Shah) and his Gorkhali aide attempted a coup d'état . Chautariya Colonel Ambar Bikram Shah and four others were killed in Teku by the Ranas for their part in the attempted assassination of Ranodip Singh.

=== Successful coup d'etat of 1885 and death ===
Ranodip Singh was assassinated by his nephews (Khadga Shumsher, Bhim Shumsher, and Dambar Shumsher) during a coup d'état in 1885. He was succeeded by his nephew, Bir Shamsher.His heir General Dhwaj Narsingh Jung Bahadur Rana took refuge in Banaras India.His memoirs are recorded in a book by William Digby “Friend in Need (1857) - 1887: Friendship Forgotten“

== Ancestry ==
Ancestors of Ranodip Singh Kunwar

16. Ahirama Kunwar
8. Ramakrishna Kunwar
4. Ranajit Kunwar
2. Bal Narsingh Kunwar
1. Ranodip Singh Kunwar
24. Birbhadra Thapa
12. Amar Singh Thapa (sanukaji)
6. Nain Singh Thapa
13. Satya Rupa Maya
3. Ganesh Kumari Thapa
28. Tularam Pande
14. Ranajit Pande
7. Rana Kumari Pande
