= Dev Shumsher Jung Bahadur Rana =

Prime Minister of Nepal in 1901

His Excellency Commanding General Shree 3 Maharaja Dev Shumsher Jung Bahadur Ranaji
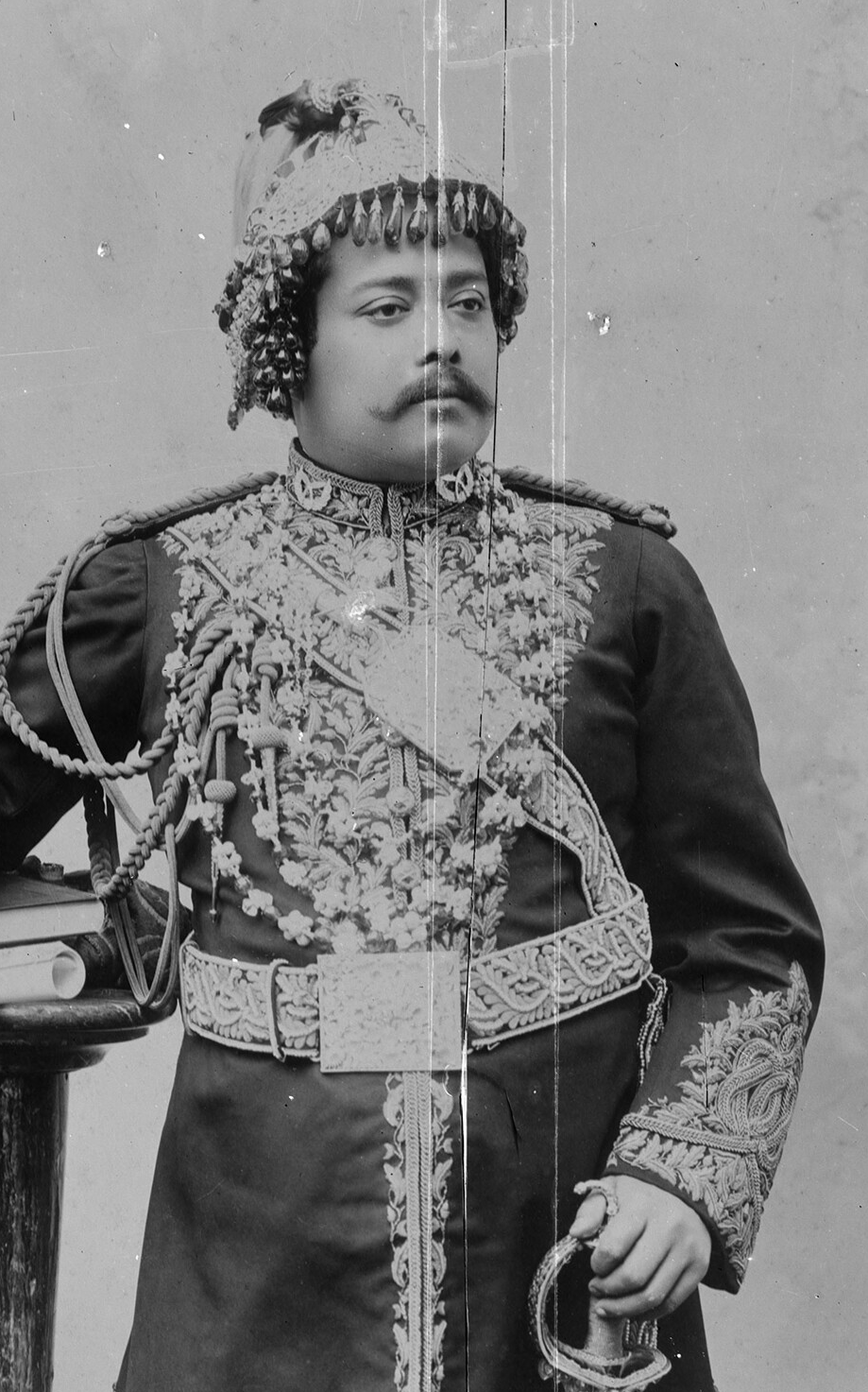
- Dev Shumsher Jung Bahadur Rana

Prime Minister of Nepal
- In office 5 March 1901 – 27 June 1901
- Monarch: King Prithvi
- Preceded by: Bir Shumsher
- Succeeded by: Chandra Shumsher

Personal details
- Born: 17 July 1862 Kathmandu, Nepal
- Died: 20 February 1914 (aged 51) Jharipani, Mussoorie, India
- Cause of death: Unknown

Sri Maharaja, Dev Shumsher Jung Bahadur Rana (17 July 1862 – 20 February 1914) was the Prime Minister of Nepal for 114 days in 1901. He was also the King of Lamjung and Kaski.

== Family and early life ==
He was the fourth of 17 sons born to Chief of the Army Dhir Shumsher Jung Bahadur Rana (a younger brother of the Rana dynasty founder Jung Bahadur Rana) and his third wife, Rani Nanda Kumari, daughter of Kazi Hemdal Singh Thapa (sister of Commanding Colonel Keshar Singh Shumsher Thapa).

His father and brothers had trouble maintaining a big family. The Shamshers were poorer than Jung and other cousins. To ease the burden on his father, Dev was adopted at a young age by his father's childless older brother, General Krishna Bahadur Kunwar Ranaji, and was raised by him and his wife.

As an adopted child of Krishna, the governor of Palpa, Dev had a lavish upbringing compared to his siblings. The only occasions he met his siblings were during festivities and family gatherings. He was closer to the sons of Jung and spent most of his time in their palace, Thapathali Durbar. He inherited his uncle's entire wealth as well as a share of his father's. Since he was much richer than his brothers, they envied him.

== Coup ==
In 1885, the Shamsher family, along with nephews of Jung Bahadur, murdered many of Jung's sons, took over Nepal in a military coup d'état, and brought in the rule of the Shamsher family (also known as the Satra Bhai (17 brothers) family). They murdered Sri 3 Maharaja Ranodip Singh and occupied the hereditary throne of Prime Minister. They later added Jung Bahadur to their name, though they were descended from Jung's younger brother Dhir Shamsher.

Dev felt guilty of what had transpired during the coup. He was held at gunpoint by General Dhoj Narsingh Rana but was forgiven and allowed to live. He asked for the exiled family members to return to Nepal. Dhoj adopted the son of Ranodip Singh (biological father was Badri Narsingh Rana), who had to flee to India with his family along with many of Jung's descendants.

Although the coup was plotted by the Shamsher brothers, Dev did not know about it. Due to his close relationship with the Jung family, the Shamshers did not believe that Dev would participate in the coup against the Jungs. On the night that the Shamshers attacked and killed the Jung Ranas, Dev was intoxicated and slept in the quarters of Ranabir Jung. He was mistaken for being a Jung and nearly killed, but was spared when one of the killers recognized him.

When the Shamshers killed and exiled the powerful Jung family and other rival Rana families, they took control of the Jungs' immense wealth.

== Accession ==
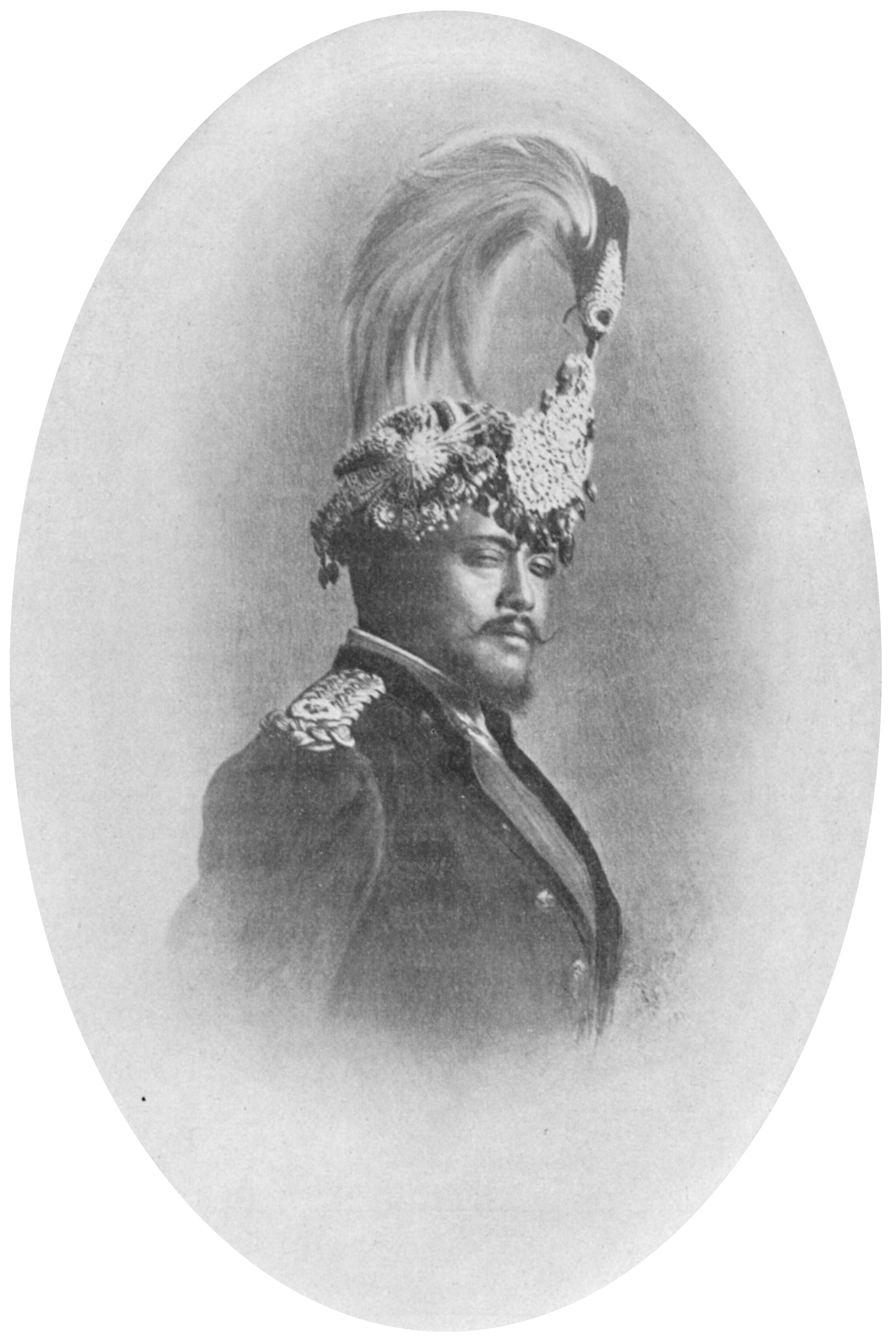
Dev Shumsher Jung Bahadur Rana in December 1898

Dev became the Prime Minister of Nepal on 5 March 1901 (1957 Falgun 15). He claimed his heredity from his late brother Sri 3 Maharaja, Prime Minister Bir Shumsher Jung Bahadur Rana (JBR), and received the "Laal Mohur", the official stamp of the King of Nepal from then-King Prithvi Bir Bikram Shah.

According to the traditions of the Rana family, relatives were appointed to high office.

- Chandra Shumsher JBR became Chief of the Army
- Bhim Shumsher JBR became Western Commanding General
- Fathe Shamsher JBR became Eastern Commanding General
- Jeet Shamsher JBR became Southern Commanding General
- and Juddha Shumsher JBR became Northern Commanding General

Dev kept his brother Fathe Shamsher Jung Bahadur Rana as Hujuriya General (Chief of the Prime Minister's bodyguard) and his nephew General Gehendra Shamsher Jung Bahadur Rana in his post of spy-chief and head of police. Gahendra was one of the most powerful people at the time, placed his allies in all the high positions of the police force since the time of his father, Prime Minister Bir Shamsher JBR. Dev appointed his brother Sher Shamsher as the Chief of Staff to then-King Prithvi Bir Bikram Shah and built a palace for him. In the same year, Sher was appointed as the first director of Nepal's first national newspaper Gorkhapatra, which is still the government national daily.

His brothers' envy led them to overthrow him in 1901 when he had become Maharajah.

Dev was satisfied with the "Universal Education" (Aksharanka Shiksha) plan prepared by Jaya Prithvi Bahadur Singh, King of Bajhang. Dev remarked in Gorkhapatra, "If anyone wishes to satisfy the prime minister, it should be with the works like this, not flattery". The publication of Weekly Gorkhapatra started in May 1901 (B.S. 1958. Vaisakha 24). Within a short period of time the paper progressed well and started publishing bi-weekly, before becoming a daily issue due to its popularity.

An iron ore mine was constructed in Thosay during Dev's time. The Thosay bazaar is 15 km away north from Manthali, the headquarters of Ramechhap district. Iron from this area was used to manufacture weapons that were used in the war against Tibet. Trekkers pass through this Thosay bazaar on their way to Mt. Sagarmatha (Everest) (Gorkhapatra Daily, 16 January 2002).

During his short tenure, Dev Shamsher was known as "The Reformist" for his progressive policies: he proclaimed universal education, began to build schools, took steps to abolish slavery, and introduced several other social welfare schemes. He also made improvements to the arsenal at Nakkhu (south of Kathmandu). As a democratic person, he took the advice of his nephew General Gehendra Shumsher, established a parliament, and built a big hall in his Thapathali Durbar like his uncle, Jung Bahadur.

He proposed a system of universal public primary education, using Nepali as the language of instruction, and opened Durbar High School to children who were not members of the Rana clan. His call for reforms did not entirely disappear; a few Nepali-language primary schools in the Kathmandu Valley, the Hill Region, and the Tarai remained open, and the practice of admitting a few middle- and low-caste children to Durbar High School continued.

Dev was also responsible for introducing a campaign in Kathmandu, Bhaktapur, and Patan to fight corruption, as well as introducing a cannon shot at midday to let people know the time. He organized a ladies court like his late uncle Jung Bahadur, and was the first person to introduce Gorkhapatra (which is still the national daily newspaper) to Nepal. He made his "Sindure Yatra" royal proclamation eight times in cities like Kathmandu, Bhaktapur, Nagarkot, and Kakani. Sources claim that his lifestyle was lavish; in his short 4-month regime, he introduced gambling for two months, along with bhajan from 3-5 p.m. and silent movies from 8-10 p.m.

Unlike his predecessors, Dev, as a reformist, drew parallels with the Tokugawa shogunate and he likewise emulated the reforms of the Meiji Restoration of Japan. He also planned to send Nepali youths to Japan for higher studies. Wisteria, chrysanthemums, persimmons, and chestnuts were imported as seeds from Japan by one of the students who studied agriculture there.

He learned about the modernization programs of Japan since 1868, the famous Meiji Ishin, the government policy, and the Meiji Constitution, and realized Japan was becoming a powerful nation in economy and national security. Dev regarded Japan as his model, and was convinced by the ideas of a constitutional monarchy and the parliamentary system. He was unable to implement his plan during his rule, but the next prime minister, Chandra Shamsher, sent students to Japan in April 1902.

== Family life ==
His personal lifestyle was considered to be extravagant, even by Rana standards. He led the most flamboyant and lavish lifestyle out of all the Rana Maharajahs.

Dev Shamsher had 13 sons and 6 daughters. His four wives were Maharani Karma Kumari, Maharani Krishna Kumari, Maharani Sarada and Rani Ganesh Kumari.

== Deposition and exile ==
Dev was deposed by his brothers and exiled to Dhankuta as governor of East Nepal, before fleeing to Darjeeling, India, under the refuge of the British Raj. He was succeeded by his brother Chandra Shamsher.

The British offered him a large plot of land in New Delhi (now Connaught Place), but he refused and chose to settle in Jharipani in Mussoorie instead, citing that he favored the cooler hills to the heat of New Delhi. He built a sprawling collection of grand buildings near Jharipani with huge gateways marking the entrances to what they[who?] had named the Fairlawn Palace which remained his residence until his death. The palace was later sold by his descendants and was abandoned. The ruins of the palace are still present and part of the estate has been developed for a school and residential purposes.

All of Dev's children were exiled to Mussorie with him, although they were allowed to travel back and forth to Nepal. They were only permitted to return when Juddha Shamsher became prime minister. Juddha, being very young, was raised by Dev's wife Karmakumari. Dev had agreed to the wishes of his dying father Dhir Shamsher to consider Juddha in the line of succession. The issue of Juddha mother Johar Kumari's caste remains a mystery and it is widely believed that she came from a no-caste Sanyasi (Giri-Puri-Bharati) background.

Both Dev and his wife supported Juddha and were crucial in ensuring he was in the line of succession. They have been referred to as his "foster parents", so when Juddha Shamsher eventually became Prime Minister of Nepal, he rescinded Dev's descendants' status as exiles. They were given back their palaces in Thapathali and large plots of land in the Banke and Bardiya districts of Nepal, where some of his descendants reside. They were given high-ranking military positions, and all of Dev's children and grandchildren were given allowances from the state. As a tribute to his foster mother, Juddha built a statue of her, which can be seen inside the zoo in Jawalakhel. It is the biggest statue of any female in the country. Many of Dev's descendants can now be found either in Thapathali in Kathmandu, the traditional home of the Ranas, or in Nepalgunj in western Nepal and in Dehradun in India.

== Ancestry ==
Ancestors of Dev Shumsher Jung Bahadur Rana

16. Ram Krishna Kunwar
8. Ranajit Kunwar
4. Bal Narsingh Kunwar
2. Dhir Shamsher Rana
20. Amar Singh Thapa (Sanukaji General) (= 12)
10. Nain Singh Thapa
21. Satyarupa Maya (= 13)
5. Ganesh Kumari Thapa
22. Ranajit Pande
11. Rana Kumari Pande
1. Dev Shamsher Jung Bahadur Rana
24. Bir Bhadra Thapa
12. Amar Singh Thapa (Sanukaji General)
6. Bakhtawar Singh Thapa
13. Satyarupa Maya
3. Nanda Kumari Thapa
