= Chandra Shumsher Jung Bahadur Rana =

Prime Minister of Nepal from 1901 to 1929

- Shree Teen Maharaja
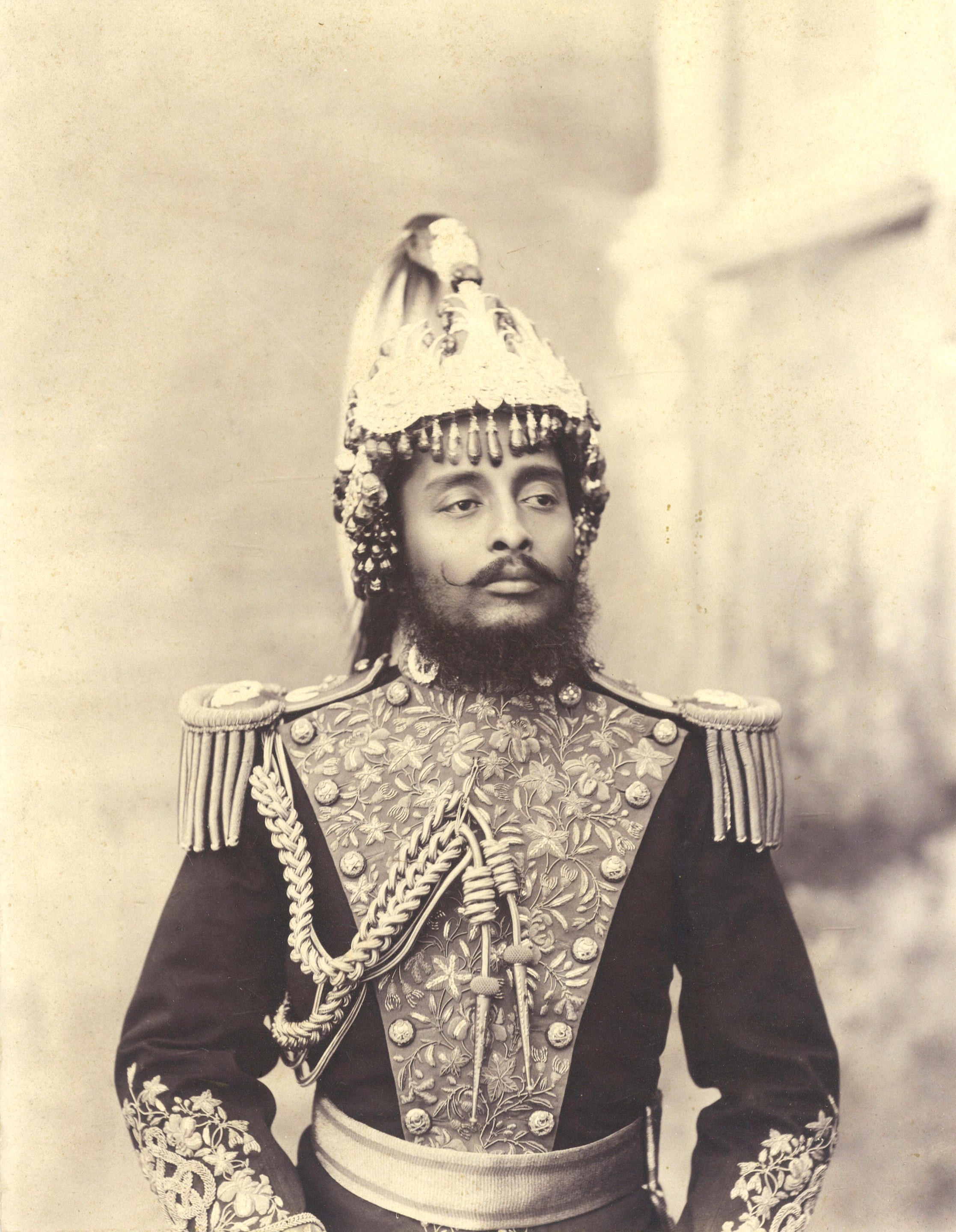
- Formal portrait

Maharaja of Lamjung and Kaski
- Reign: 27 June 1901 – 26 November 1929
- Coronation: 27 June 1901
- Predecessor: Dev Shumsher
- Successor: Bhim Shumsher

Prime Minister of Nepal
- In office 27 June 1901 – 26 November 1929
- Monarchs: Prithvi; Tribhuvan
- Preceded by: Dev Shumsher
- Succeeded by: Bhim Shumsher
- Born: 8 July 1863; Kathmandu, Kingdom of Nepal
- Died: 26 November 1929 (aged 66); Kathmandu, Kingdom of Nepal
- Spouse: Chandra Loka Bhakta; Bala Kumari Devi
- Issue: Mohan Shumsher; Baber Shumsher; Kaiser Shumsher; Singha Shumsher; Krishna Shumsher
Regnal name
- Field Marshal H.H. Shree Teen Maharaja Sir Chandra Shumsher Jung Bahadur Rana GCB GCSI GCMG GCVO FRGS
- Dynasty: Rana
- Father: Dhir Shumsher
- Mother: Nanda Kumari
- Religion: Hinduism
- Military career
- Allegiance: Kingdom of Nepal
- Branch: Nepalese Army
- Rank: Field Marshal

Chandra Shumsher Jung Bahadur Rana (Nepali: चन्द्रशमशेर जङ्गबहादुर राणा; 8 July 1863 – 26 November 1929) was a Prime Minister of Nepal from the Rana dynasty. He served in this capacity from 27 June 1901 to his death in 1929 after he successfully deposed his liberal and reformist brother Dev Shamsher. Although generally perceived as despotic and conservative, he is credited with several reforms, including the abolition of slavery and establishing the Nepal–Britain Treaty of 1923, which recognized Nepal as an independent nation and an ally of Britain.

== Family and early life ==
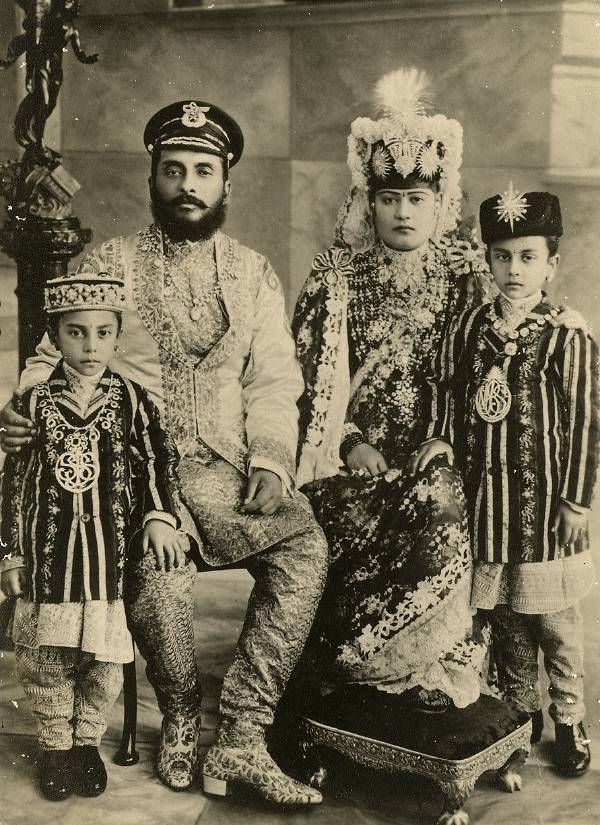
Chandra Shumsher's immediate family

Chandra Shumsher was the sixth of the seventeen sons of Dhir Shumsher Rana (the youngest brother of the Rana dynasty founder Jung Bahadur Rana) through his Thapa wife Nanda Kumari, of whom he was the third son. He was educated in Kolkata and thus became the first Nepalese Prime Minister who had passed matriculation examination. In the convocation address of 1884, the Vice Chancellor of Calcutta University praised him as: "a gentleman who has shown he can handle pen as efficiently as sword." Seto Bagh, a historical novel set on the early days of Chandra Shumsher, depicts him as an ambitious and cunning young man with an excellent command of the English language.

== Rise to power ==
Chandra Shumsher, c. 1880–1922

He along with his brothers Khadga Shumsher and Bhim Shumsher orchestrated the murder of his uncle Sri Teen Maharaja Ranodip Singh in order to rise in the line of succession for the hereditary Rana Prime Minister of Nepal. After the demise of his eldest brother Bir Shamsher in March 1901, he became the Commander in Chief of the Nepalese Army under the premiership of his brother Dev Shamsher. Dev Shamsher was a liberal and, fearing the rise in public awareness and eventual democratisation that his short rule had brought, Chandra Shamsher orchestrated a coup d'état and seized the power for himself in June 1901. Although opposed to reforms and public education, he would later bring numerous reforms, most of them unwillingly, after his visit to Europe, as he found Nepal to be far more backwards than Europe.

In Chandra Shumsher's regime, Sardar Ram Mani Acharya Dixit was one of the mandarins to wield enormous influence by virtue of his proximity. Chandra used Ram Mani's native genius to keep the Mahila Gurujyu in check and ran the country with the advice of these two brilliant brahmins. With their help, Chandra amassed a fortune by making deals with the British over the recruitment of Gurkha soldiers and the mercenary services rendered by the Royal Nepali Army on the side of the British Empire.

== Rule ==
During the 28 years of his rule, Chandra Shumsher held the firm control of domestic as well as the foreign policy of Nepal. His ADC (Assistant Deputy Commissioner) was Nar Narayan Shah. He went to Britain under the guidance of his ADC. Nar Narayan Shah worked as ADC for 20 years.

After his return from the European tour, he is said to have been embarrassed by the backwardness of his country, so he executed noteworthy reforms. He abolished Sati custom, in which Hindu widow was burned alive on her deceased husband's funeral pyre, and made it illegal for a person to be killed for witchcraft. He was counseled by Sardar Ram Mani Acharya Dixit, which further assured him to ban the ritual suicide, and make additional reforms such as abolishing slavery with the money from the treasury of Pashupatinath temple. He built the first college of Nepal, Tri-Chandra College in 1975 B.S. He established several canals in Terai region and established hospitals throughout Nepal. The first railway service in Nepal, Nepal Government Railway from Raxaul to Amlekhganj, started its service in his tenure. These reforms, however, were mostly brought for the benefit of his family.

He was the second Nepalese prime minister to visit Britain and tour Europe after Jung Bahadur Rana. In Britain, he stayed in Mortimer house and was entertained by His Majesty Edward VII. He also observed naval exercises of British Royal navy and in one of the warships, he met the French President under the arrangement of Edward VII. On 24 June, the University of Oxford conferred the honoris causa degree of Doctor of Civil Laws on him. On his departure, the Daily Telegraph wrote:

During the last few years this country has been visited by an unexampled succession of foreign personages, but none of them has been more interesting and few more important than the Prime Minister of Nepal.

He provided monetary and military assistance to Britain in the First World War, as a result of which Nepal received a huge sum of monetary assistance and the friendship became even more cordial after the successful conclusion of the Nepal–Britain Treaty of 1923, which recognised Nepal as an independent nation and an ally of the British Empire.

== Legacy ==
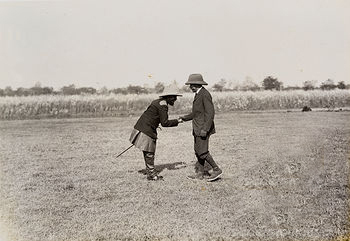
Prime Minister Chandra Shamsher (left) greeting King George V during a hunting trip to the Nepal Terai in 1911

Chandra Shamsher suffered from tuberculosis and followed a strict diet regimen of rice and black lentils exclusively, as a result he was extremely thin and is sometimes called "Phistey Maharaj". A popular quote "चन्द्रे हाँस्यो त नास्यो" suggests that he seldom laughed and his laughter was rather an ominous one. He abolished Sati custom and slavery from Nepal. TriChandra Campus, Tribhuwan Chandra Military Hospital, and Chandra Jyoti Hydro Power at Pharping still bear his name as he established them. Singha Durbar, then the largest palace in Asia with over 1,200 rooms, was built by him. Chandra Nahar, the oldest canal of Nepal located in Saptari, was built by him as well. The city of Chandranigahpur in Rautahat district was named after him.

== Descendants ==
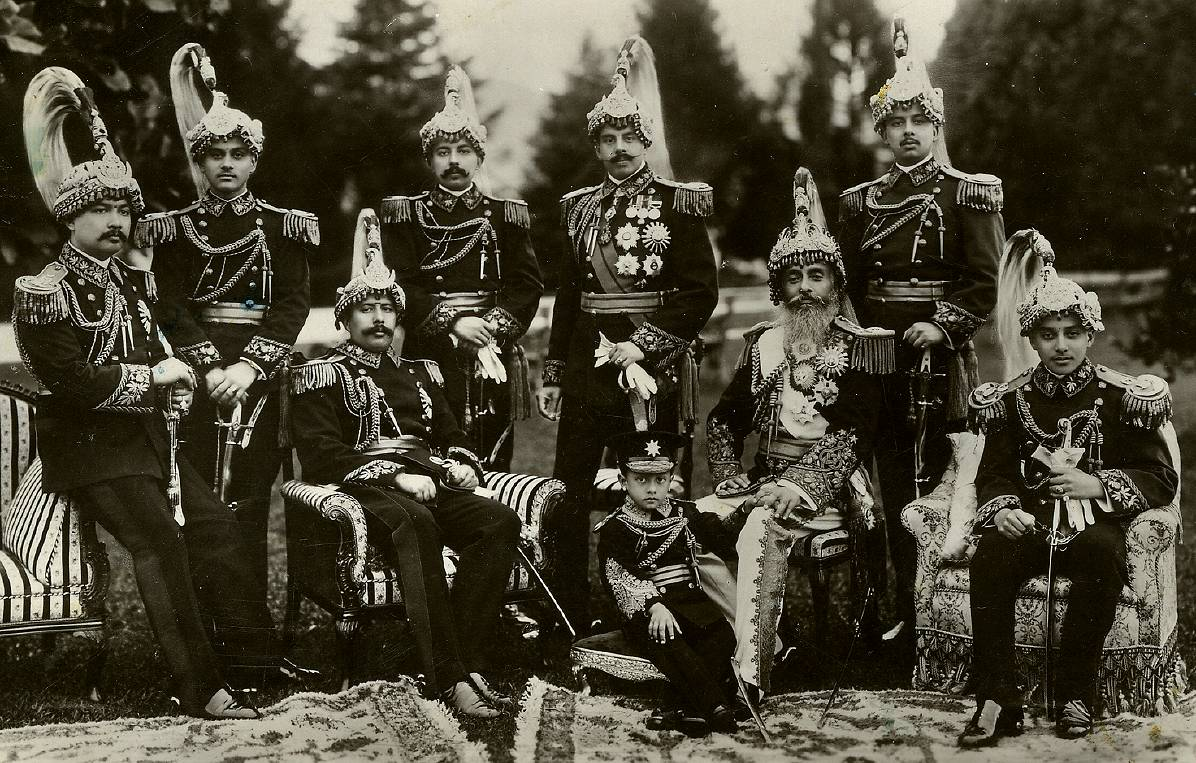
All eight sons of Chandra Shamsher

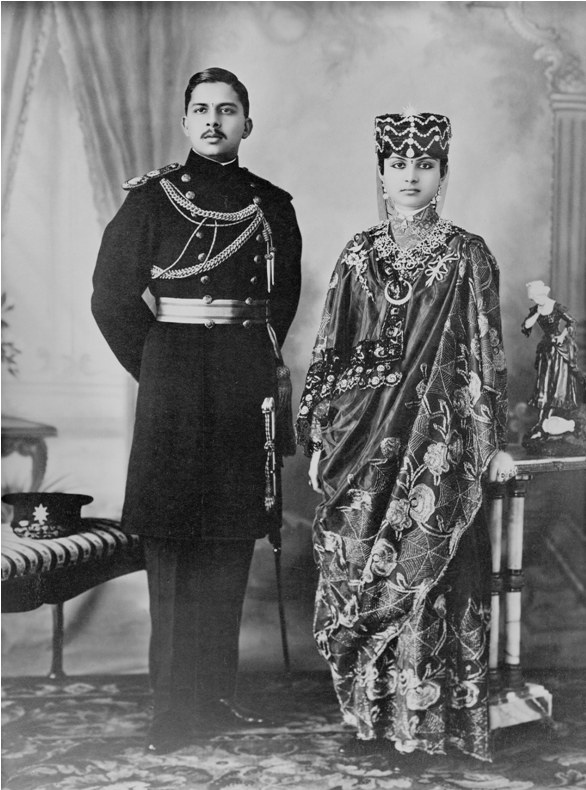
Chandra Shamsher's son and daughter-in-law, Ranaji Vishnu Shamsher and Raniji Urmila Devi

Chandra Shamsher's descendants are still among the most prominent members of the Rana family. They are scattered all over the princely states of the Indian subcontinent. Since Chandra Shamsher ruled Nepal for a period of 28 years and had the exclusive control of the national economy, he accumulated immense wealth and built lavish palaces for his sons. His descendants are the richest in all of the Rana dynasty.

Given below is the list of Chandra Shamsher's children:

- Khagaraja Divyeshwari Rajya Lakshmi (1880–191?), married to Raja Jai Prithvi Bahadur Singh of Bajhang.
- Field-Marshal Shree Maharaja Mohan Shamsher, GCB, GCIE, GBE, (23 December 1885 – 6 January 1967) who succeeded to the title of the 9th Rana Maharaja of Nepal. The century-old family oligarchy of the Ranas came to an end during the reign of Mohan Shamsher.
- Commanding General Sir Baber Shamsher Jang Bahadur Rana, GCVO, GBE, KCSI, KCIE (27 January 1888 – 12 May 1960), desc. Senior Rana during the Mohan Shamsher premiership, Sir Baber was the Mukthiyar and Commander-in-Chief of the Royal Nepalese Army. Minister of Defence in the Congress Rana Cabinet.
- Field-Marshal HH Sir Kaiser Shamsher Jung Bahadur Rana, GBE (8 January 1892 – 7 June 1964), desc. Married Lakshmi Rajya Lakshmi, the then heir apparent of king Prithvi of Nepal.
- Commanding General Singha Shamsher Jung Bahadur Rana, KBE (23 December 1893 – 19?), desc. He was the Ambassador to India (1948–1951).
- Commanding General Krishna Shumsher Jung Bahadur Rana, KCSI, KBE (28 February 1900 – 19 May 1977), desc. In 1909, he married Princess Tara Rajya Laxmi Devi, the third daughter of King Prithvi of Nepal. He died in Bangalore, India in 1977.
- Major-General Vishnu Shamsher Jung Bahadur Rana (13 November 1906 – 4 February 1946). Exiled, died in the Bahamas having had one son – Rajkumar Pitamber Shamsher Jung Bahadur Rana (1931–2005). Removed from the line of succession.
- General Shanker Shamsher Jung Bahadur Rana, GBE (1909 – 4 June 1976), desc. Nepal's Representative to the Court of St. James.
- Lt.-Gen. Madan Shumsher Jung Bahadur Rana (1909–1955), desc.
- Shrimati Divyeshwari Rajya Lakshmi (1918–1999), desc.
- Major-General Maharajkumar Badri Shumsher Jung Bahadur Rana, desc.

== Honours ==
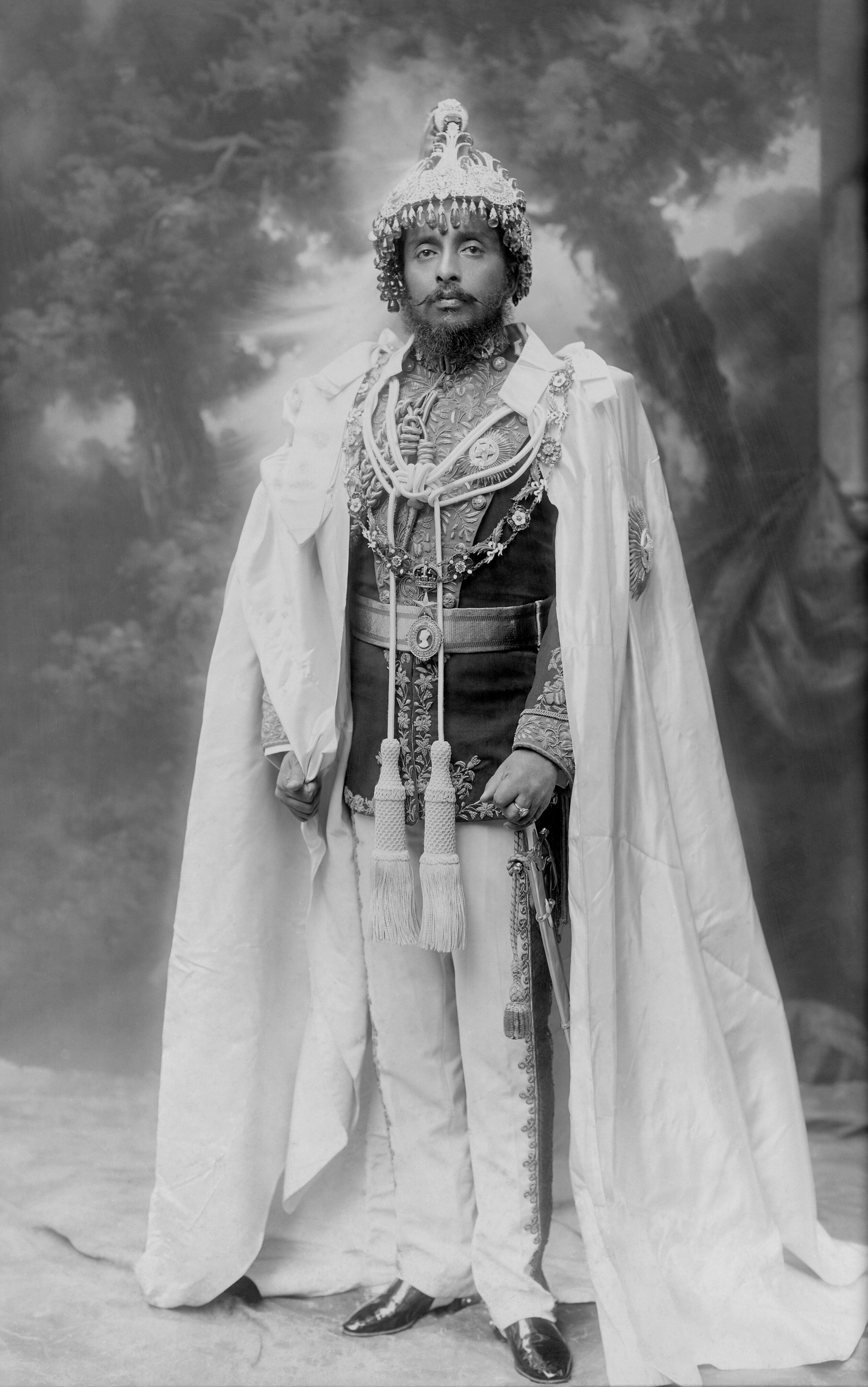
Chandra Shumsher in 1908

- (United Kingdom) Empress of India Medal – 1877
- (British Raj) Delhi Durbar Medal – 1902
- (Qing dynasty) T'ung-ling-ping-ma-Kuo-Kang-wang (Truly valiant Prince, Commander-in-chief of foot and horse) – 1902
- (United Kingdom) Knight Grand Cross of the Order of the Bath (GCB) – 1905
- (British Raj) Knight Grand Commander of the Order of the Star of India (GCSI) – 1905
- (United Kingdom) Knight Grand Cross of the Royal Victorian Order (GCVO) – 1911
- (British Raj) Delhi Durbar Medal – 1911
- (United Kingdom) Knight Grand Cross of the Order of St Michael and St George (GCMG) – 1919
- (France) Grand Officer of the Legion d'Honneur – 1925
- (France) Grand Cross of the Legion d'Honneur – 1929

== Ancestry ==
Ancestors of Chandra Shumsher Jung Bahadur Rana

8. Ranajit Kunwar
4. Bal Narsingh Kunwar
2. Dhir Shamsher Rana
10. Nain Singh Thapa
5. Ganesh Kumari Thapa
11. Rana Kumari Pande
1. Chandra Shamsher Jang Bahadur Rana
12. Amar Singh Thapa (Sanukaji General)
6. Bakhtawar Singh Thapa
13. Satyarupa Maya
3. Nanda Kumari Thapa

== See also ==
- Succession to the Nepalese throne
