= Bhim Shumsher Jung Bahadur Rana =

Prime Minister of Nepal from 1929 to 1932

His Highness Sri Teen Maharaja Bhim Shumsher Jung Bahadur Rana, GCSI, GCMG, KCVO
- श्री ३ भीम शमशेर जङ्गबहादुर राणा
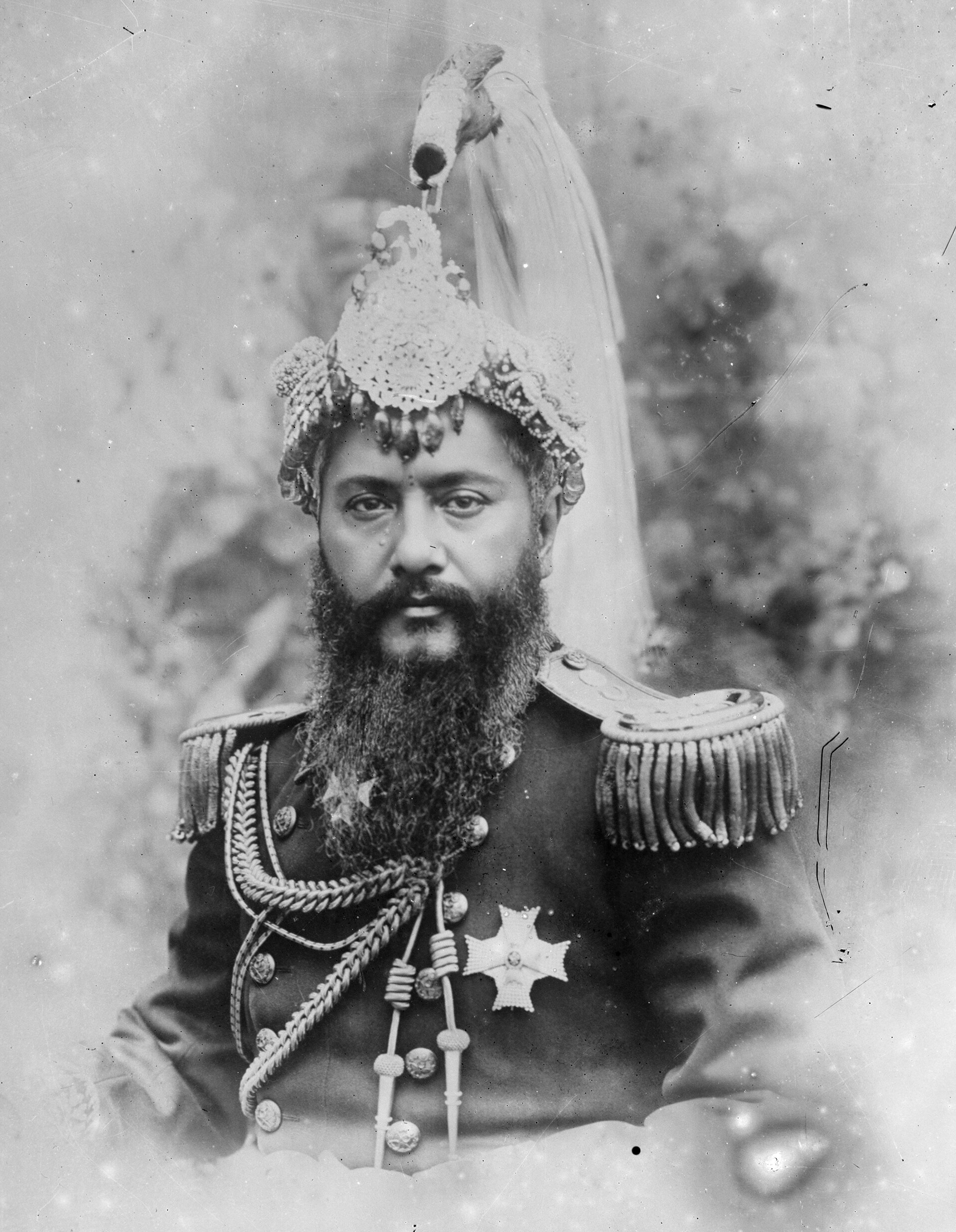

Prime Minister of Nepal
- In office 26 November 1929 – 1 September 1932
- Monarch: Tribhuvan of Nepal
- Preceded by: Chandra Shumsher Jung Bahadur Rana
- Succeeded by: Juddha Shumsher Jung Bahadur Rana

Personal details
- Born: 16 April 1865 Thapathali Durbar, Kathmandu
- Died: 1 September 1932 (aged 67) Singha Durbar
- Spouse: Her Highness Sri Teen Sita Bada Maharani Deela Kumari Devi
- Relations: Subarna Shamsher Rana (Grandson)
- Children: Padma Shumsher Jung Bahadur Rana; Ram Shamsher Jung Bahadur Rana; Hiranya Shamsher Jung Rana; Yogya Shamsher Jung Bahadur Rana; Chhoree Maharani Somgarbha Dibyeshwari Rajya Laxmi
- Parents: Dhir Shamsher Rana (father); Nanda Kumari (mother)

Bhim Shumsher Jung Bahadur Rana (Maharaj Bhim Shumsher) ruled Nepal from 26 November 1929 until his death on 1 September 1932. He was born on 16 April 1865.

Bhim Shumsher held the following titles: T'ung-ling-ping-ma-Kuo-Kang-wang (Republic of China), Maharaja of Lamjung and Kaski (Nepal), GCSI (1 January 1931), GCMG (22 December 1931), KCVO (24 December 1911), and Supradipta Manyabara (Commander-in-Chief). Before becoming ruler of Nepal, Bhim Shumsher was the heir apparent (with the rank of field marshal) from 1907 to 1929.

== Family ==
Bhim Shumsher was the sixth son of Dhir Shamsher Rana, the youngest brother of Rana dynasty founder Jung Bahadur Rana. Bhim Shumsher's son, Padma Shumsher Jung Bahadur Rana, ruled Nepal from 29 November 1945 to 30 April 1948; his other sons held prominent state positions until 1951.

== Rise to power ==
Bhim Shamsher joined the Nepalese Army as a lieutenant colonel in 1868. He became a colonel in 1879, northern commanding general from 1885 to 1887, the eastern commanding general from 1887 to 1901, senior commanding general of the western command and chief of army staff from 1901 to 1907, and heir apparent and commander-in-chief from 1907 to 1929. Bhim Shamsher was aide-de-camp to King George V during his visit to Nepal in December 1911, and he was crowned ruler of Nepal on 26 November 1929.

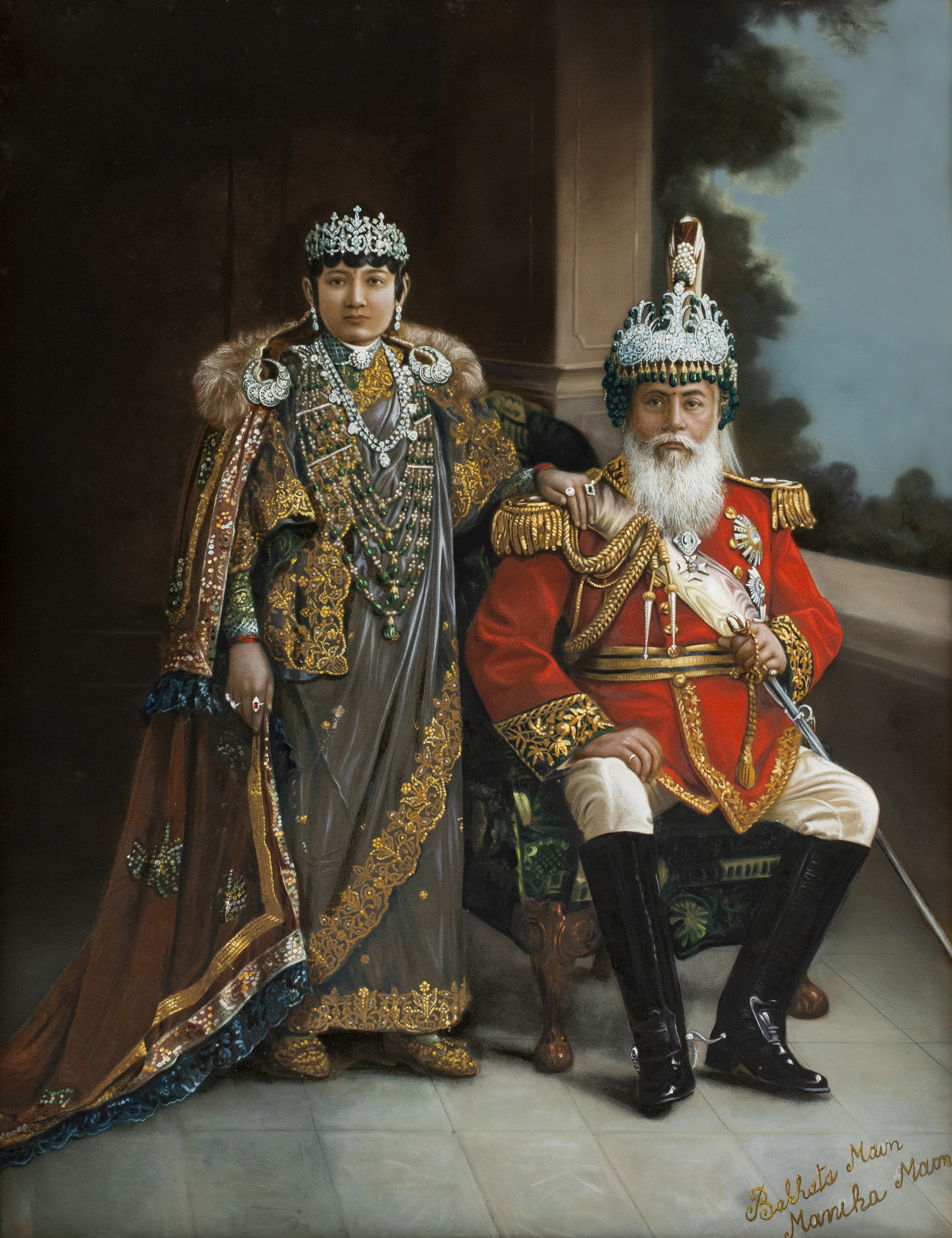
Bhim Shamsher and his wife, Sita Bada Maharani Deela Kumari Devi, on his coronation day in 1929

Bhim Shumsher became Field Marshal of Nepalese Army on 26 November 1929, Honorary Major General of the British Army on 4 April 1930, Honorary Colonel of the 4th Gorkha Rifles on 4 April 1930, and Honorary General of the Chinese Army on 23 February 1932. He received the Grand Master award of the Most Refulgent Order of the Star of Nepal.

== Rule ==
Although Bhim Shamsher was considered an autocrat, he introduced several reforms such as making Saturdays a holiday, fixing working hours from 10:00 to 16:00 on weekdays, protecting tenant farmers from land-reform, abolishing duties on cotton and salt, ending the pasture tax, and abolishing capital punishment. His wife Sita Bada Maharani Deela Kumari Devi played a central role in these reforms. Bhim Shamsher built several district hospitals, extended the drinking-water pipelines in eastern Nepal, and built public roads and bridges. Bhim Shamsher oversaw the expansion of waterworks for Kathmandu and the Terai region during his reign. His most-notable bridge, Kalo Pul (Black Bridge, over the Bagmati River in Kathmandu) remains in operation, and he upgraded the middle schools of Bhaktapur and Kathmandu's Patan district to high-school standards.

== Foreign relations ==
Bhim Shumsher was allied with Kuomintang China in the north and the British Raj in India in the south, both of whom had interests in Nepal. He received the Delhi Durbar Medal from Britain in 1911 and the Order of the Sacred Tripod (寶鼎勳章) on 23 February 1932 from the Republic of China.

Bhim Shumsher contained the British interests in Nepal to economic support in exchange for Gurkha soldiers for the British Army. He invited William Birdwood, commander-in-chief of the British forces in India, to Kathmandu in 1930. Bhim Shumsher visited Calcutta in 1931 to meet with viceroy Lord Irwin about their relations with Tibet, since the British wanted to develop a trade route with Tibet via Nepal. Relations between Tibet and Nepal were deteriorating, however, and the British wanted to mediate the dispute. After his visit to India, he was honored by Indian and Chinese governments.

The threat of an armed Tibetan-Nepalese conflict arose in the spring of 1930. Relations between Tibet and Nepal had soured since August 1929 because of what Bhim Shumsher saw as Lhasa's maltreatment of S. Gyalpo, a Tibetan-Nepalese who was arrested in the city; Bhim Shumsher's diplomats said that Gyalpo was a Nepalese subject, and the Tibetans disagreed. Gyalpo escaped from custody, and sought shelter at the Nepalese embassy in Lhasa. Tibetan police entered the embassy and took Gyalpo away; the move outraged Bhim Shumsher, who ordered the mobilization of troops in preparation for war against Tibet in February 1930.

Tensions between the countries placed a heavy burden on Tibetan military defense, and Chiang Kai-shek informed the 13th Dalai Lama of his willingness to send troops and officials to assist the Tibetans in their fight against the Nepalese. Although the Dalai Lama tactfully declined what he saw as the entry of Han Chinese troops (and officials) into Tibet, Chiang Kai-shek continued to display goodwill towards the Tibetans by promising to exercise diplomatic pressure on British India and Nepal in the Tibetan-Nepalese dispute.

The head of the Mongolian and Tibetan Affairs Commission and Chiang Kai-Shek's key deputy, Ma Fuxiang, arranged for a diplomatic initiative with Nepal on behalf of Chiang. Chiang's officials reached Kathmandu via India in September 1930 to meet Bhim Shumsher, who was informed that they came to "offer the services of the Chinese government to settle the dispute." The delegation presented Bhim Shumsher with gifts from Chiang Kai-Shek which included porcelain, ancient Chinese textiles, lacquerware, jade, ivory, and other Chinese artifacts. Bhim Shumsher repudiated the Chinese government's claims of involvement in any issue between Tibet and Nepal, however, and noted that British-led mediation had already helped reach a peaceful settlement. The result suggested to China that Chiang Kai-shek's efforts led to the peaceful resolution between Tibet and Nepal, and he had protected Chinese sovereignty.

Bhim Shumsher continued to develop diplomatic relations with Kuomintang politicians during his rule, and balanced relations with the British Raj in India. He also developed diplomatic relations with Japan and several European powers.

== Ancestry ==
Ancestors of Bhim Shumsher Jung Bahadur Rana

16. Ram Krishna Kunwar
8. Ranajit Kunwar
4. Bal Narsingh Kunwar
2. Dhir Shamsher Rana
20. Amar Singh Thapa (sanukaji)
10. Nain Singh Thapa
21. Satyarupa Maya
5. Ganesh Kumari Thapa
22. Ranajit Pande
11. Rana Kumari Pande
1. Bhim Shamsher Jung Bahadur Rana
24. Bir Bhadra Thapa
12. Amar Singh Thapa (sanukaji)
6. Bakhtawar Singh Thapa
13. Satyarupa Maya
3. Nanda Kumari Thapa
