= Bakhtawar Singh Thapa =

Sri Kaji Bakhtawar Singh Thapa
- श्री काजी बख्तावर सिंह थापा

Governor of Palpa

Personal details
- Born: Gorkha
- Died: 1832 A.D. Palpa Province, Kingdom of Nepal
- Children: Trivikram Singh Thapa
- Parents: Amar Singh Thapa (sanu) (father); Satyarupa Maya (mother)
- Relatives: Bhimsen Thapa (brother); Nain Singh Thapa (brother); Ranabir Singh Thapa (brother); Mathabarsingh Thapa (nephew); Ujir Singh Thapa (nephew); Queen Tripurasundari of Nepal (niece)

Military service
- Allegiance: Gorkha Kingdom
- Rank: Kaji
- Battles/wars: Anglo-Nepalese War

Bakhtawar Singh Thapa (Nepali: बख्तावर सिंह थापा), also spelled Bhaktawar, was a Nepalese military commander, politician, and governor. He acted as an aide of his brother Mukhtiyar Bhimsen Thapa and was appointed the commander of Samar Jung Company. He commanded the Bijayapur-Sindhuli Gadhi Axis in the first campaign of Anglo-Nepalese War and Makwanpur Gadhi Axis in the second campaign. Later, he became the governor of Palpa and died in the office.

== Early life ==
Bakhtawar Singh Thapa was born to military officer Kaji Amar Singh Thapa (sanu) and Satyarupa Maya. He was the brother of Mukhtiyar Bhimsen Thapa and had three brothers - Nain Singh Thapa, Amrit Singh Thapa, and Ranabir Singh Thapa. From his step-mother, he had two brothers—Ranbam and Ranzawar. His ancestors were members of Bagale Thapa clan from Jumla who migrated eastwards. His grandfather was Bir Bhadra Thapa, a courtier in the army of Gorkha king Prithvi Narayan Shah.

== Career ==
=== Commander of the Palace ===
After the Bhandarkhal Massacre of 1806, the Samar Jung Company was selected as royal palace guards by Mukhtiyar Bhimsen Thapa. Bakhtawar Singh was appointed the commander of the company to be camped inside the palace for the protection of King Girvan Yuddha Bikram Shah and Queen Tripurasundari of Nepal. In the maturity of King Girvan Yuddha Bikram Shah and Queen Tripurasundari of Nepal, Kaji Bakhtawar slowly gained confidence of both for his role as their protector. The death of King Girvan Yuddha Bikram Shah and his two queens in 1816 had dashed his hopes. After the end of Anglo-Nepalese war, Kaji Bakhtawar was suspected by his brother Bhimsen Thapa to have joined the enemy factions. At the time, he was living in the same family with his brother without the division of their ancestral property. Bhimsen slowly brought Kaji Bakhtawar under his control but their mother pleaded only a light punishment for Bakhtawar. He was dismissed from his position and was imprisoned in the Nuwakot prison and the Bakhtawar's Samar Jung Company was heavily disfavored by the Mukhtiyar.

=== Anglo-Nepalese War ===
Bakhtawar was the commander of Bijaypur-Sindhuli Gadhi axis during the first campaign of the Anglo-Nepalese war. He was stationing the fort and the region by 2000 soldiers. In the second campaign, he was commanding his headquarter at Makwanpur Gadhi. He sent the final ratified document of Sugali Treaty to the British East India Company after the Hitaura camp of Major General David Ochterlony on 4 March 1816.

=== Governor of Palpa ===
A letter dated March 1824 to his brother Mukhtiyar Bhimsen Thapa shows Bakhtawar Singh as the governor of Palpa. Members of the Thapa dynasty were appointed as the governor of Palpa because it controlled over 4 battalions of the Nepalese Army. Bakhtawar Singh died in his office of Chief Administrator of Palpa in 1832 A.D.

== Family ==
=== Son ===
His son Trivikram Singh Thapa became Acting Chief Administrator of Palpa in 1832 A.D. on death of his father. However, Bhimsen Thapa did not trust Trivikram Singh and instead appointed his brother Ranabir Singh Thapa as Chief Administrator of Palpa in March 1833. Trivikram Singh was affectionately referred as Kaji Mama ("Kaji Uncle") by the Shamsher Ranas. After the Kot Massacre, he occupied the Lazimpat Durbar for 28 years until he left for Varanasi in 1875.

=== Wife ===
The widow of Bakhtawar Singh on 1839 presented evidences against the former Mukhtiyar and her brother-in-law Bhimsen Thapa claiming the former Mukhtiyar responsible for poisoning of King Girvan Yuddha Bikram Shah, whom it was widely known to have died from smallpox.

== Books ==
- Acharya, Baburam (January 1, 1971) [1962], "The Fall of Bhimsen Thapa and the Rise of Jung Bahadur Rana" (PDF), Regmi Research Series, 3 (1): 13–25
- Acharya, Baburam (September 1, 1972) [1967], "General Bhimsen Thapa and Samar Jung Company" (PDF), Regmi Research Series, 4 (9): 161–167
- Acharya, Baburam (Nov 1, 1974) [1957], "The Downfall of Bhimsen Thapa" (PDF), Regmi Research Series, 6 (11): 214–219
- Acharya, Baburam (2012), Acharya, Shri Krishna (ed.), Janaral Bhimsen Thapa : Yinko Utthan Tatha Pattan (in Nepali), Kathmandu: Education Book House, p. 228, ISBN 9789937241748
- Pradhan, Kumar L. (2012), Thapa Politics in Nepal: With Special Reference to Bhim Sen Thapa, 1806–1839, New Delhi: Concept Publishing Company, p. 278, ISBN 9788180698132
- Shaha, Rishikesh (1990), Modern Nepal 1769–1885, Riverdale Company, ISBN 0-913215-64-3
- Hamal, Lakshman B. (1995), Military history of Nepal, Sharda Pustak Mandir
- Whelpton, John (1991), Kings, soldiers, and priests: Nepalese politics and the rise of Jang Bahadur Rana, 1830–1857, Manohar Publications, p. 254, ISBN 9788185425641
