= Bir Bhadra Thapa =

Nepalese politician, courtier and military officer

Sri Kaji Bir Bhadra Thapa
- श्री काजी वीरभद्र थापा

Personal details
- Children: Jeevan Thapa; Bangsha Raj Thapa; Amar Singh Thapa (Sanu)
- Parent: Bikram Thāpā (father)
- Relatives: Shivaram Singh Basnyat (uncle); Abhiman Singh Basnyat (cousin); Bhimsen Thapa (grandson); Nain Singh Thapa (grandson); Bhaktabar Singh Thapa (grandson); Ranabir Singh Thapa (grandson); Mathabarsingh Thapa (great-grandson); Ujir Singh Thapa (great-grandson); Queen Tripurasundari of Nepal (great-granddaughter)

Military service
- Allegiance: Gorkha Kingdom Nepal
- Rank: Kaji
- Battles/wars: Unification of Nepal

Bir Bhadra Thapa or Birabhadra Thapa (Nepali: वीरभद्र थापा) also spelled Virabhadra or Virbhadra, was a politician, courtier and military officer in the Gorkha Kingdom during the 18th century. Born in the medieval Tanahun Kingdom, he left his ancestral property there and migrated to the uprising Gorkha Kingdom. He got entry into the minor ranks of the military of King Prithvi Narayan Shah due to being a nephew of Sura Prabha, the wife of military commander Shivaram Singh Basnyat of the Basnyat dynasty. Thereafter, he took part in the various battles of the Unification of Nepal throughout his life. Among his grandsons, Bhimsen Thapa went on to become the Mukhtiyar of Nepal (equivalent to Prime Minister) for 31 years and the founder of the Thapa dynasty.

== Family ==
Birbhadra belonged to the prominent Bagale Thapa clan of Jumla that migrated eastwards as per Gorkha chronicles. The Thapa genealogy states that Birbhadra was a grandson of Bikram Thāpā and son of Bijay (Bijai) Thāpā. However, the Sardari annual reinstatement letter of his youngest son Amar Singh Thapa (sanu) on Chaitra 1855 B.S. mentioned Amar Singh Thapa (Sanu) as grandson of Bikram Thapa and son of Birbhadra Thapa. Thus, historian Baburam Acharya contends that Bijai Thāpā was an imaginary figure. Similarly, the Sundhara Inscription of his grandson Bhimsen Thapa, also further validates the point that Birbhadra was the son of Bikram Thapa.

He was the patron of the leading Thapa Chhetri group (i.e. Thapa dynasty) in the Royal Court. He had three sons; Jeevan Thapa, Bangsha Raj Thapa and Amar Singh Thapa (sanu). His eldest son died in the Battle of Kantipur with powerful Kaji Kalu Pande. The seven sons of Amar Singh Thapa (sanu) - Bhimsen Thapa, Nain Singh Thapa, Bakhtawar Singh Thapa, Amrit Singh Thapa and Ranabir Singh Thapa, all participated and contributed in the expansion and unification of Nepal.

== Career ==
King Prithvi Narayan Shah's first military commander Shivaram Singh Basnyat was married to Sura Prabha, a sister of Bikram Thapa and an aunt of Birbhadra. Therefore, he came from Tanahun Kingdom to Gorkha Kingdom leaving all his ancestral property there due to his close family relations with Shivaram Singh. Another factor to attribute to this migration was the uprising fame and attraction of Gorkha Kingdom. Birbhadra, being a nephew of Shivaram Singh's wife Sura Prabha, was easily recruited into the minor ranks of Jamadar in the army of the Gorkha Kingdom. But by the last period of King Prithvi Narayan's reign, his name was written at the foremost in one of the royal letters.

When King Prithvi Narayan Shah annexed Nuwakot in 1744, he was one of the influential Bharadars. After the conquest of Naldum area, he along with Commander Shivaram Singh Basnyat conquered Sanga, Panauti, Sankhu and adjacent areas. The Gorkhali chronicle states that he was the commander of the Gorkhali forces. He commanded the Gorkhali troops during the capture of Kavre and Palanchowk with fellow commanders Chautariya Daljit Shah and Kaji Harka (Harsh) Pantha. He was deployed to Kaski allowing two Brahmins from there to reside in Kathmandu as a part of friendly diplomacy with the Kaski Kingdom. He commanded troops near the hill in Sindhuli against the English advance of Major Kinloch.

Birbhadra was also among the guarantors to the ex-King Rana Bahadur Shah who took a debt from Seth Dwarikadas on 1860 B.S. during ex-King Rana Bahadur's exiled life in Banaras.

== Sources ==
- Acharya, Baburam (1967), Sri Panca Badamaharajadhiraja Prthvinarayana Saha: Samdipta Jivani, I. Sam.1723-75 (in Nepali), vol. 2–3, Kathmandu: Sri Panca Maharajadhiraja Press Sachivalaya
- Acharya, Baburam (2012), Acharya, Shri Krishna (ed.), Janaral Bhimsen Thapa : Yinko Utthan Tatha Pattan (in Nepali), Kathmandu: Education Book House, p. 228, ISBN 9789937241748
- Hamal, Lakshman B. (1995), Military history of Nepal, Sharda Pustak Mandir, p. 125, OCLC 32779233
- Pradhan, Kumar L. (2012), Thapa Politics in Nepal: With Special Reference to Bhim Sen Thapa, 1806–1839, New Delhi: Concept Publishing Company, ISBN 9788180698132
- Regmi, Mahesh Chandra (1995), Kings and political leaders of the Gorkhali Empire 1768-1814, Orient Longman, ISBN 9788125005117
- Mahler, Ferd (1999), Under the Painted Eyes : A Story of Nepal, New Delhi: Banarsidass Publishers, ISBN 81-208-1683-8
- Khatri, Shiva Ram (1999), Nepal Army Chiefs:Short Biographical Sketches, University of Michigan: Sira Khatri
- D.R. Regmi (1975), Modern Nepal, vol. 1, Firma K.L. Mukhopadhyay, ISBN 0883864916
- Thāpā, Śamśera Bahādura (1991), Sugaulī-sandhi ke ho?: itihāsa, Śaśi Vikrama Thāpā
