= Battle of Jit Gadhi =

1814 battle between Nepal and the East India Company

- Part of the Anglo-Nepalese War
Date	1814
Location	Jit Gadhi, Nepal 27.703441600641476°N 83.45955422881201°E
Result	Nepalese victory

Belligerents
East India Company	Nepal

Commanders and leaders
John Sullivan Wood	Ujir Singh Thapa

Strength
Unknown	1,200

Casualties and losses
Over 300	~70
- Location within Lumbini Province Battle of Jit Gadhi (Nepal)

The Battle of Jit Gadhi (Nepali: जितगढीको युद्ध; sometimes referred to as Jit Gadh) was fought in 1814 in Jit Gadhi, Lumbini Province between Nepal and the East India Company.

It resulted in Nepalese victory. The battle was commanded by Ujir Singh Thapa and John Sullivan Wood.
