= Jumla rebellion =

- जुम्ला विद्रोह
- Location of Jumla in Nepal.
- Date: 1793
- Location: Jumla, Kingdom of Nepal
- Caused by: Gorkha conquest of Jumla (1789)
- Goals: Withdrawal of Gorkha from Jumla
- Result: Government of Nepal said if the rebellion continues this will happen: Degrade to a lower caste if he is Brahmin; Be sold to slavery; Be killed

Lead figures
Kingdom of Nepal; Ranajit Kunwar	Sobhan Shahi; People of Jumla

The Jumla rebellion (Nepali: जुम्ला विद्रोह) was a revolt in the Kingdom of Nepal against the Gorkha conquest of Jumla. The people of Jumla did not accept Gorkhas as their rulers which sparked recurring rebellions.

== Aftermath ==
In October 1794 the Government of Nepal sent a letter to the people which read:

It is five years since we occupied that region. During that period, you have created much trouble. However, we pardon you for whatever you may be done during these five years. If even now any one engages in rebellion or intrigue, we shall degrade you to a lower caste if he is a Brahman, or else enslave or behead him according to his caste. Understand this well. We shall, however, reward these who are loyal to us.

— Government of Nepal,

In 1794, Ranajit Kunwar was replaced by Subba of Jumla. Kunwar was given a royal order which said to cancel all fines, restore all slaves, horses, and other things that were unjustly taken. Later, Subba Ranjit Kanwar, Subedar Dhanjit Rana, and other military officials deputed to Jumla, were given another royal order which read: We have now received reports that even then you have enslaved members of the families of the rebels. We had then ordered you to restore such slaves to freedom, but none of you have obeyed the order. You shall be punished if you do not do so even after receiving this order".
