= Jit Gadhi =

- जितगढी
- Butwal, Lumbini Province in Nepal
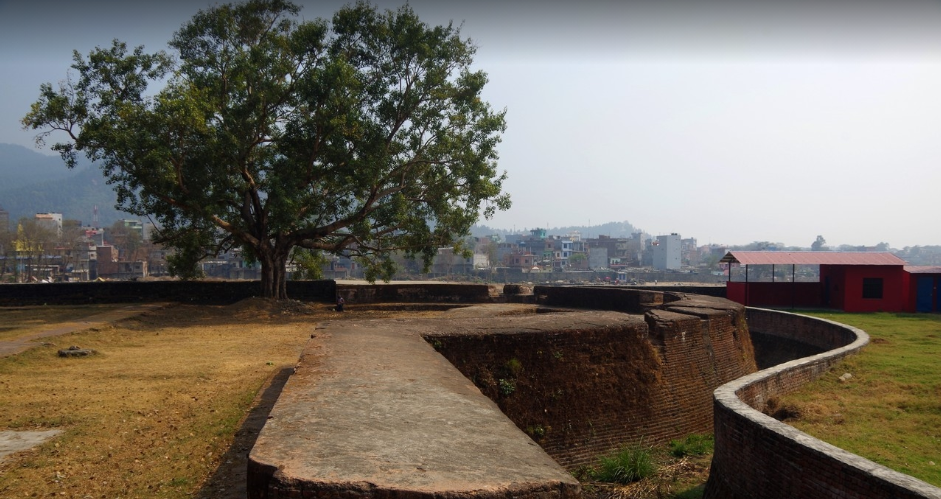
- Jit Gadhi in 2021

Site information
- Type: Fort

Location
- Location of Jit Gadhi in Nepal Jit Gadhi (Nepal)
- Coordinates: 27.703441600641476°N 83.45955422881201°E

Site history
- Built by: Sen dynasty
- Battles/wars: Battle of Jitgadhi (1814)

The Jit Gadhi (Nepali: जितगढी; historically known as Butwal Gadhi) is a fort in Butwal, Lumbini Province, Nepal. It was built by the Sen dynasty.

The fort was used during the Anglo-Nepalese War (1814–1816) where Colonel Ujir Singh Thapa led Nepal's victory in the Battle of Jitgadhi against the East India Company.

In 2019, the Butwal Sub-Metropolitan City revealed the life-size statue of Ujir Singh Thapa near the fort citing the historic significance. In 2021, a war museum was inaugurated to commemorate the Battle of Jit Gadhi.
