= Governor of Palpa =

In the Kingdom of Nepal, the Governor of Palpa (Nepali: पाल्पाका बडा हाकिम, romanized: Palpākā baḍā hākima) was the head of Palpa Gaunda (Province). This position was considered to be most important outside of the capital, Kathmandu. The Governor of Palpa was directly appointed by the prime minister.

== Governors ==
Governor	Years	Notes	Ref(s)
Amar Singh Thapa	1806–1814	Father of Bhimsen Thapa	
Bakhtawar Singh Thapa	1824		
Ujir Singh Thapa	1825		
Badri Narsingh Kunwar			
Khadga Shumsher Jung Bahadur Rana	1887		
