= Ujir Singh Thapa =

Nepalese administrator and military officer

Sri Colonel Kaji Ujir Singh Thapa
- श्री कर्णेल काजी उजिरसिंह थापा
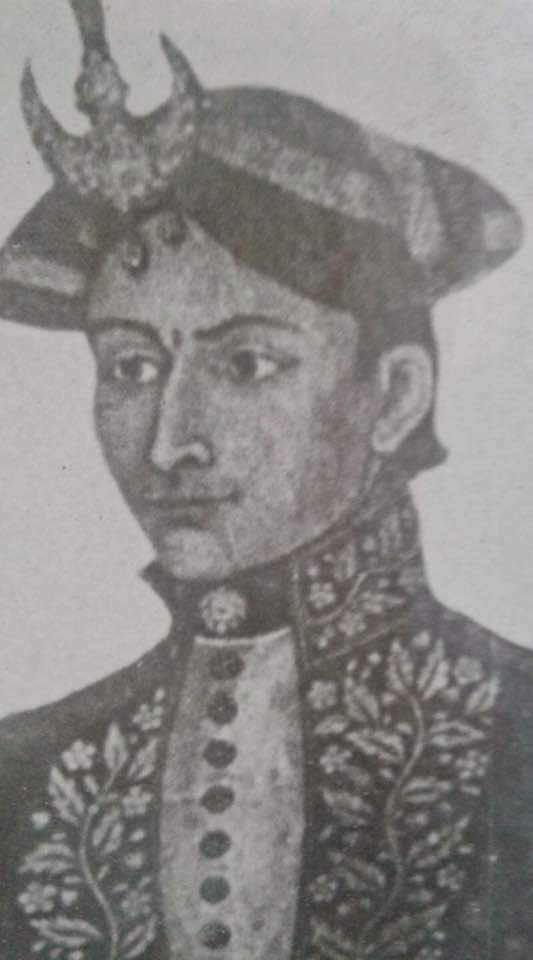
- Colonel Ujir Singh Thapa Kaji wearing noble attire at young age

Governor of Palpa
- In office 8th Mangshir, 1871 B.S. – circa 1825
- Preceded by: Amar Singh Thapa

Personal details
- Born: Chaitra, 1852 Bikram Samwat (1796 A.D.)
- Died: 20th Mangshir, 1881 B.S. (aged 29) Aryaghat, Kathmandu
- Relations: Bhimsen Thapa (uncle); Ranajit Pande (maternal grandfather); Queen Tripurasundari of Nepal (sister); Mathabarsingh Thapa (brother); Jung Bahadur Rana (nephew)
- Parents: Nain Singh Thapa (father); Rana Kumari Pande (mother)
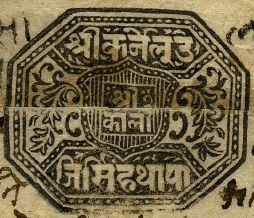
- Signature

Military service
- Allegiance: Nepal
- Rank: Colonel (Nepali convention)
- Battles/wars: Anglo-Nepalese war

Ujir Singh Thapa or Uzir Singh Thapa (Nepali: उजिरसिंह थापा), also known as Wazir Simha Thapa, anglicized as Wuzeer Singh, was a Nepalese administrator and military officer. He was the son of Kaji Nain Singh Thapa, a nephew of the Mukhtiyar Bhimsen Thapa and elder brother of Mathabar Singh Thapa. His mother was Rana Kumari Pande, daughter of Mulkaji Ranajit Pande and granddaughter of Kaji Tularam Pande. During his late teenage, he was the military commander at the Palpa-Butwal axis during the Anglo-Nepalese War. He became the Governor (Bada Hakim) and the commander of armed forces deployed in Palpa administrative sector in 1814 AD on substitute of his grandfather Amar Singh Thapa (sanukaji) who died that year.

== Family and early life ==
Ujir Singh was born on Chaitra Shukla Pratipada Tithi in the year 1852 of Bikram Samvat (1796 A.D.). He was the son of Kaji Nain Singh Thapa and grandson of Sanu Sardar Amar Singh Thapa. His grandfather died on 7th Kartik 1871 B.S. He traveled 20 days from Kathmandu to Palpa and took the control of the office of Governor of Palpa Gauda (Province) on 8th Mangshir, 1871 B.S. aged 19 years old.

== Military and administrative career ==
He was Colonel (Note: The use of English terms for their grades of command was common in the Nepalese army, but the powers of the different ranks did not correspond with those of the British system. The title of General was assumed by Bhimsen Thapa, as Commander-in-chief, and enjoyed by himself alone; of Colonels there were three or four only; all principal officers of the court, commanding more than one battalion. The title of Major was held by the adjutant of a battalion or independent company; and Captain was the next grade to colonel, implying the command of a corps. Luftun, or Lieutenant, was the style of the officers commanding companies under the Captain; and then followed the subaltern ranks of Soobadar, Jemadar, and Havildar, without any Ensigns.) in the ranks of Nepalese Army and was awarded an official private black seal which can be seen in the letter of 1821 A.D. to the Mukhtiyar Bhimsen Thapa. He obtained a famous victory against the British forces at the Battle of Jit Gadhi during the Anglo-Nepalese War of 1814–1816. He was the military commander at the Mid-Western (Palpa-Butwal) axis during the Anglo-Nepalese War. He had deployed 1200 troops in defenses of Jit Gadhi, Nuwakot Gadhi, and Kathe Gadhi. He was famous for exploiting an advantage in men, material, natural resources and well versed in mountain tactics. Henry Thoby Prinsep quoted about the Jeetgadh administered by Ujir Singh as :

....that Goorkhas under Colonel Wuzeer Singh, a nephew of Bheem Sein's, had taken post at the mouth of the pass, within which Bootwul is situated, and had built there a stockade called Jeetgurh, it was resolved to reconnoitre the works, and carry them, if possible, before processing further.

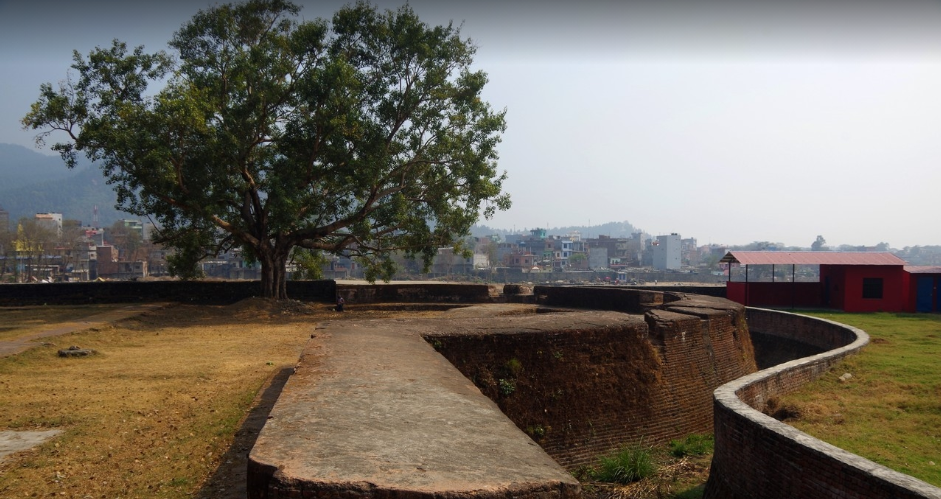
Jitgadi Fort

Before entering the war, Ujir Singh had constructed roads, bridges, culverts and fortified garrisons in the Butwal-Palpa region. The British advance began on 22 Poush, 1871 B.S.(January 1814 A.D.) to Jit Gadhi. While crossing Tinau River to attack the fortress Ujir's forces opened the fire and made them fall back. Similarly, at Tansen Bazaar the British fell back with a total loss of 300 men while 70 Nepalese lost their lives.

In 1825, a complaint of border incursions was lodged at the jurisdiction of Ujir Singh's administration. Such was done to oppose the Mukhtiyar Bhimsen Thapa in the policy of forging alliance with the Burmese government.

== Sindoor Jatra procession ==
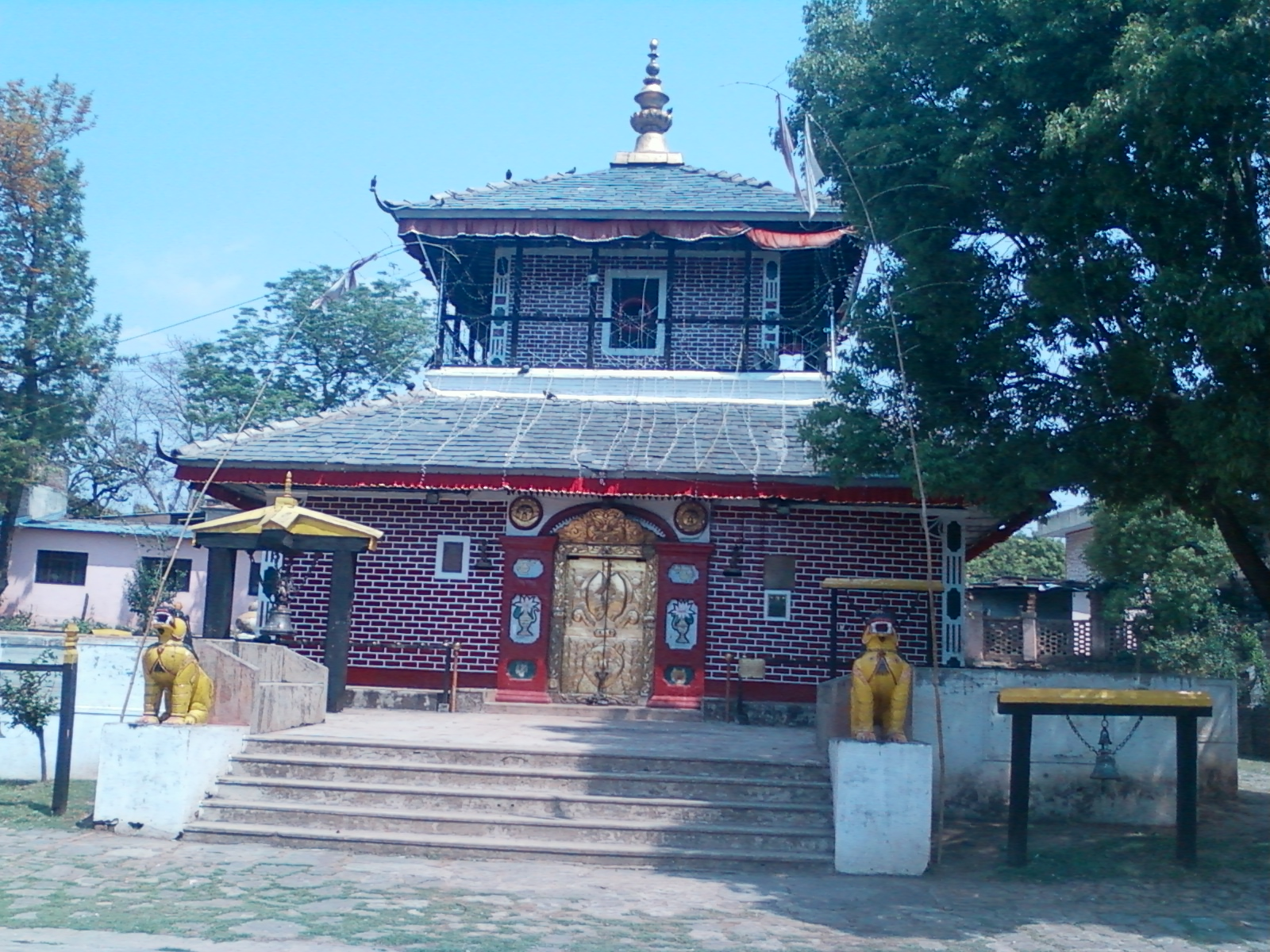
Rana Ujireshwori Bhagawati Temple of Tansen, Palpa

Various deities were worshipped and auspicious time was determined to ensure victory before initiating war with British forces on the 1814-1816 war. Ujir Singh then touched the feet of a 16 handed Mahishashur Mardini Bhagwati deity in Tansen Bazaar and took solemn vow to spread her fame by constructing a temple and initiating a Sindoor Jatra (procession of vermillion) upon the victory of Gorkhali forces in the war. After the victory of the Gorkhali forces, he began the construction of a three storied temple in 1872 V.S. which was accomplished in 1876 V.S. After the completion of construction of the temple, he donated gold equivalent to his height as the Gajur (pinnacle) for the temple and constructed silver canopied Mahishashur Mardini Bhagwati whose 18 arms were built of Ashtadhatu (octo-alloy). He started the Khat Jatra, together with Palpa Bhagwati's Sindoor Jatra, on the day of Bhadra Krishna Nawami in 1877 V.S. For the purpose of worship and rituals, he had invited Chandramani Gubhaju of Patan to perform Nitya Naumaitik Puja, Barsha Bandhan Puja and Tantric rituals during Kalaratri, Chaite Dashain, and others. The procession is observed till date as celebration of victory.

== Military Laws ==
Ujir Singh Thapa had issued six rules in 1879 V.S. for the purpose of both civil and military administration.

== Legacy ==
On Friday 7 April 2017, the Chief of Army Staff (Nepal) Rajendra Chhetri unveiled the life-size statue of Ujir Singh at Tansen, Palpa. The statue was constructed jointly by the Palpa Chambers of Commerce and Industry and the Chandi Prasad Battalion of Nepal Army. Another life-size statue of Ujir Singh and the largest national flag of Nepal was also planned to be installed at the Jitgadhi Killa fort which is located at the Western bank of Tinau River in Butwal. The fort was named Jeetgadh after the victory of Nepali forces against the British forces during the Anglo-Nepalese War of 1814–1816. Jeetgadh was to be developed as symbol of nationalism and landmark of Butwal as per the Butwal Mayor Shivaraj Subedi.

== Ancestry ==
Ancestors of Ujir Singh Thapa

16. Vikrama Thapa
8. Bir Bhadra Thapa
4. Amar Singh Thapa (sanukaji)
2. Nain Singh Thapa
5. Satyarupa Maya
1. Ujir Singh Thapa
24. Valiram Pande
12. Tularam Pande
6. Ranajit Pande
3. Rana Kumari Pande

== Gallery ==
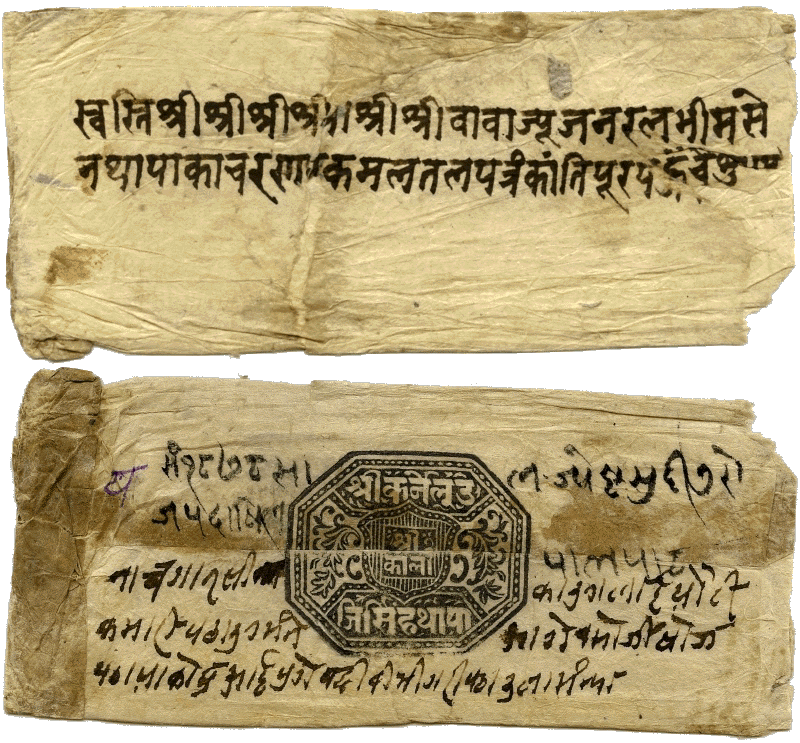
Ujir Singh Thapa's letter to his uncle Mukhtiyar Bhimsen Thapa whom he refers to in the cover of letter as Babajyu Janaral (Father General);

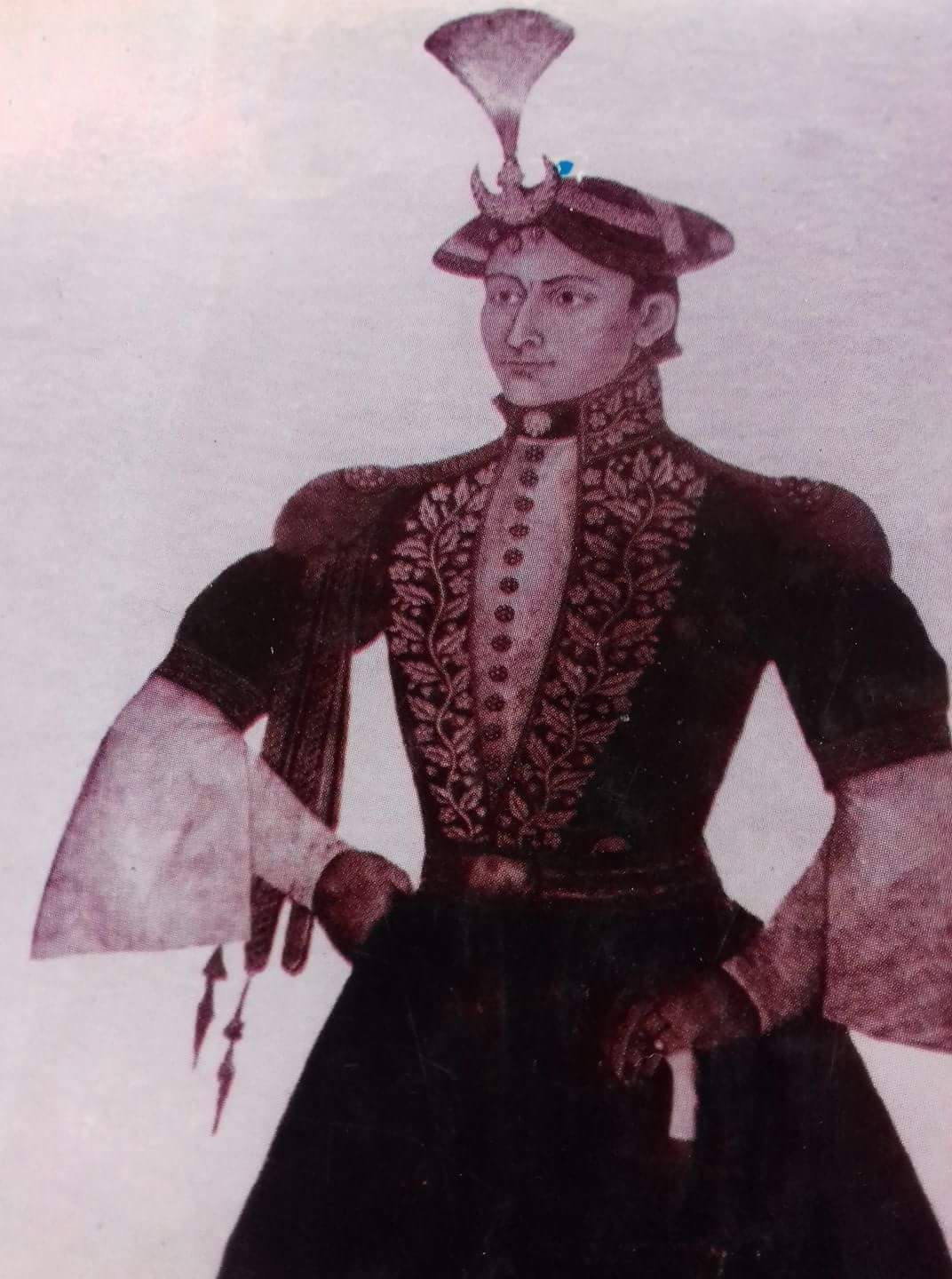
Ujir Singh Thapa

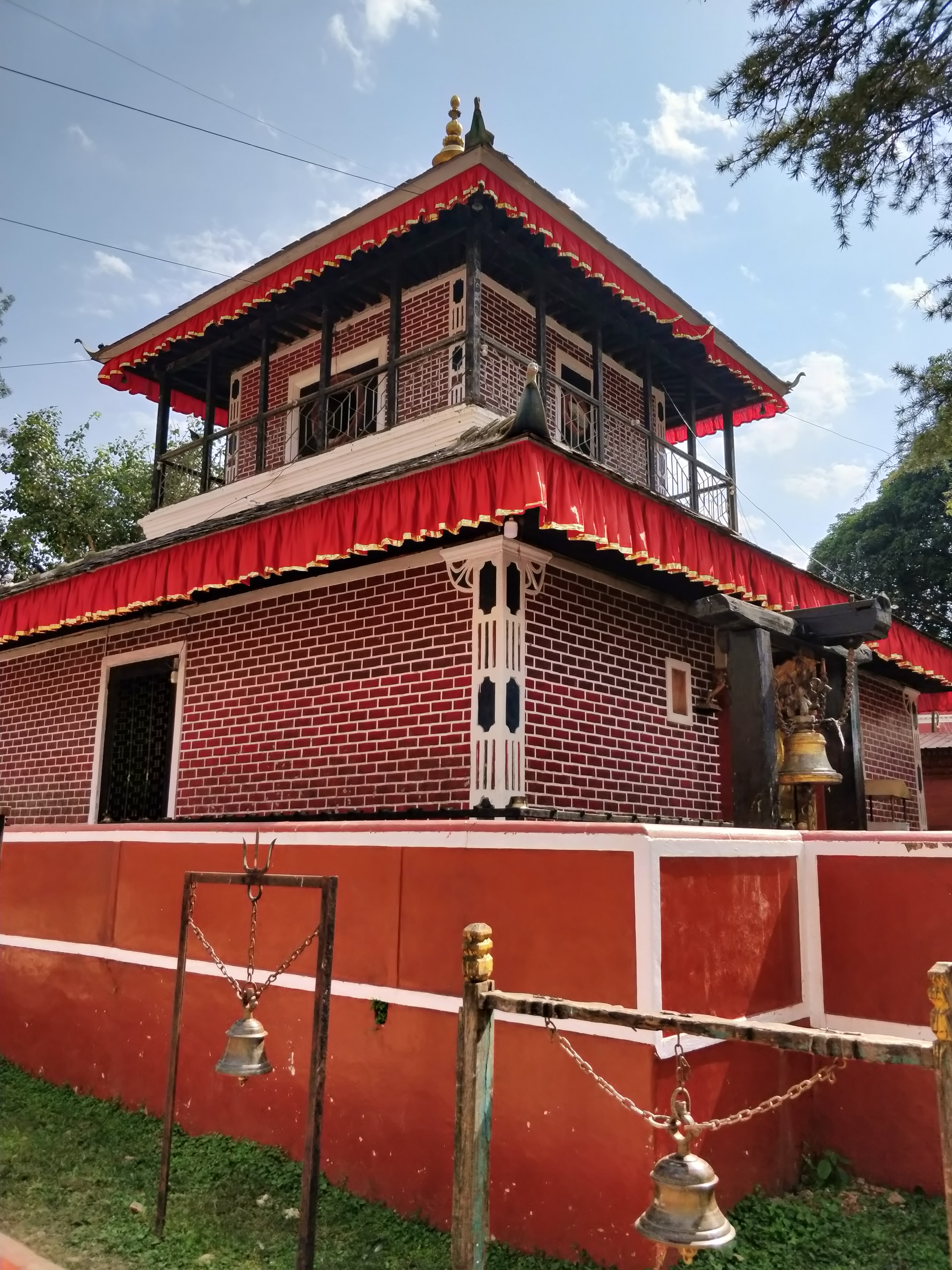
Rana Ujireshowri Temple he build after victory over British

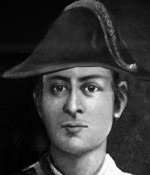
Colonel Ujir Simha Thapa

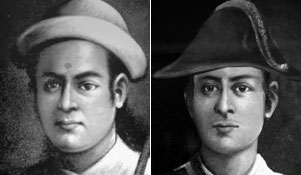
Colonel Ujir Simha Thapa and Captain Balbhadra Kunwar both fought in Anglo-Nepalese War
