= Amar Singh Thapa (born 1759) =

Military commander, courtier, minister and regional administrator of Nepal

Sanukaji General Amar Singh Thapa
- सानुकाजी जनरल अमर सिंह थापा

Governor of Palpa
- In office 1806-1814
- Preceded by: established
- Succeeded by: Ujir Singh Thapa

Personal details
- Born: 1816 Bikram Samvat (1759 AD) Gorkha
- Died: 7th Kartik, 1871 Bikram Samvat (October 1814 AD) Palpa Province, Kingdom of Nepal
- Spouse: Satyarupa Maya
- Parent: Bir Bhadra Thapa (father)
- Relatives: see Thapa dynasty; see Rana dynasty

Military service
- Allegiance: Nepal
- Rank: General
- Battles/wars: Sino-Nepalese War; Battles of Unification of Nepal

Amar Singh Thapa (1759 – October 1814), distinguished as Sanukaji Amar Singh Thapa (Note: He was distinguished from Bada Amar Singh Thapa by distinguishing terms Sanu and Bada meaning junior and senior.) (Nepali: सानुकाजी अमर सिंह थापा Sānukājī Amar Siṃh Thāpā) was a Nepalese military commander, courtier, minister and regional administrator. He was born as the youngest son of one of the leading Gorkhali Bharadar (state-bearing officer) Birabhadra Thapa. He led battles against many independent principalities in Nepal and a battle against Tibet. He was a Governor of Palpa and retained the post till his death in 1814.

Sanu Amar Singh had many influential descendants. He was the father of Mukhtiyar Bhimsen Thapa, Kaji Nain Singh Thapa, Kaji Bakhtawar Singh Thapa and acting Mukhtiyar Ranabir Singh Thapa. He was the grandfather of the first titular Prime Minister of Nepal Mathabarsingh Thapa, Queen Mother Tripurasundari of Nepal, Colonel Ujir Singh Thapa and great-grandfather of Maharaja Jang Bahadur Kunwar Ranaji, Bam Bahadur Kunwar, Ranodip Singh Kunwar and other Jang brothers & their descendants, all through his second son Nain Singh Thapa.

== Family ==
He was born as the third and youngest son of Kaji Bir Bhadra Thapa. His two elder brothers were Jeevan Thapa and Bangsha Raj Thapa of which Jeevan Thapa died in the Battle of Kirtipur with Kalu Pande. He had two wives one of whom was Satyarupa Maya and the other remains unnamed. His sons with Satyarupa Maya were Bhimsen, Nain Singh, Bakhtawar Singh, Amrit Singh, and Ranabir Singh. From his second wife, he had two sons—Ranbam and Ranzawar.

== Career ==
He took part in the war against the Tibet. He fought at Kerung Axis during the Sino-Nepalese War under the leadership of Chautariya Balbhadra Shah and alongside Kirtiman Singh Basnyat and Bhotu Pande. He was sent with Balbhadra Shah, Pratiman Rana Magar and all Thargars and Oomaras for defence of Adijgarh. He also fought battles against many independent principalities of Nepal.

When Rana Bahadur Shah abdicated the throne in 1799, Sanu Amar Singh and his son Bhimsen Thapa were promoted from Subedar to the rank of Sardar. Sanu Amar Singh and his father Birbhadra Thapa were in close military affiliations with Kaji Abhiman Singh Basnyat due to which his son Bhimsen obtained the position of personal secretary of ex-King Rana Bahadur Shah from the patronage of Abhiman Singh's nephew Kirtiman Singh. He was appointed as Administrator of Palpa Gauda (Province) in 1806 AD. In 1811 AD, he was promoted to rank of General. He died on 7th Kartik, 1871 B.S. (October 1814 AD) while serving as Governor of Palpa District. He was subsequently replaced by his teenager grandson Ujir Singh Thapa as Governor of Palpa.
