= Ranajit Kunwar =

Sri Kaji Ranajit Kunwar
- श्री काजी रणजीत कुँवर

Personal details
- Born: c. 1753 C.E.
- Died: c.1815 C.E. Kangra, Kingdom of Nepal (present-day Kangra, Himachal Pradesh, India)
- Children: Bal Narsingh Kunwar; Balaram Kunwar; Rewanta Kunwar
- Parent: Ramakrishna Kunwar (father)
- Relatives: see Kunwar family

Military service
- Allegiance: Nepal
- Battles/wars: Western Campaigns of Unification of Nepal (Battle of Jumla; Battle of Khurbura)

Ranajit Kunwar (Nepali: रणजीत कुँवर, c. 1753–1815) was a Nepalese governor and military personnel in the Kingdom of Nepal. He was a son of Ramakrishna Kunwar of Kunwar family. He served as governor of Jumla, Pyuthan and sub-ordinate administrator under Amar Singh Thapa at Srinagar of Garhwal province. He suppressed the rebellion of Jumla as a governor. He fought at the battle of Khadbuda where he killed King Pradyumna Shah of Garhwal. He was the grandfather of Jang Bahadur Kunwar Ranaji who later became the Maharaja of Kaski & Lamjung and Prime Minister of Nepal.

== Early life ==
He was born to Gorkhali Sardar Ramakrishna Kunwar on 1753 A.D. He was the first cousin of Chandrabir Kunwar, father of Balbhadra Kunwar.

== Career ==
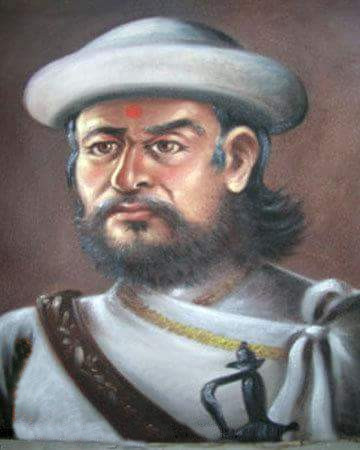
Kaji Abhiman Singh Basnyat, Ranajit's senior commander at the Kerung Axis in the 1792 CE campaign of Sino-Nepalese War

After the consolidation of Pyuthan in November 1786, Ramakrishna Kunwar opened an ammunition factory at Pyuthan. He died there and was succeeded by his son Ranajit Kunwar for the operation of the factory. Ranajit participated as reinforcement to Gorkhali forces under Chautariya Shree Krishna Shah in the Kuti Axis (1st division) in the first campaign of the Sino-Nepalese War on 1788 A.D. He then acted as subordinate commander under Kaji Abhiman Singh Basnyat at Kerung Axis on 1792 A.D. Sino-Nepalese War.

The inhabitants of Jumla did not accept the conquest by Gorkhali rulers and frequently invoked rebellions on the Gorkhali administration. A royal order then warned the residents of Jumla against rebellion with punishment according to their caste. A royal order issued on Tuesday Jestha Badi 11, 1850 V.S. (May 1793) mentions that on 1849 V.S. (1792 A.D.), the locals led by the former ruler Sobhan Shahi had rebelled in opposition to Subba (governor) Ranajit Kanwar at Jumla. The inhabitants were then consequently enslaved upon that incident. The royal order frees all the slaves of that Jumla rebellion incident on Tuesday Jestha Badi 11, 1850 V.S. Similarly, in another incident, Subba Ranajit Kunwar imposed heavy fines on the inhabitants of Jumla as a result of their rebellion in 1793. (Note: The English translation of the royal order to Subba Ranajit Kunwar in April 1794 is: You have imposed heavy fines on the inhabitants of Jumla because they had rebelled in 1793. They have come here to complain against such punishment. Whatever may have been collected in the past, the collection of fines every year has led to a depopulation of that territory. In order to check that trend, we hereby remit all arrears of such fines. Bhardars who had been deputed to the west had been instructed to kill all rebels of above the age of 12 years, but not to enslave other members of their families and let them cultivate the land. No action shall be taken in contravention of such instructions. Restore all slaves and horses that you have unjustly taken. The territory must be made populous and enjoyed. You shall be punished if you act in contravention of the regulations.) A royal order of King Girvan Yuddha Bikram Shah dated Shrawan Sudi 2, 1859 V.S. (July 1802) shows that Ranajit Kunwar was in his tenure at Jumla on 1851 Vikram Samvat (1794 A.D.). Finally, Ranjit Kanwar was replaced by Jog Narayan Malla as Subba (governor) of Jumla on Baisakh Badi 1, 1851 (April 1794).

The royal orders dated Bhadra Badi 11, 1853 (August 1796) mentions Subba Ranajit as in-charge of fort construction at Pyuthan. The local Amalidar of Isma was also instructed for necessary preparations for construction of Pyuthan fort under Subba Ranajit. He was further ordered to repair bridges over the Madi river and build checkposts at Sheoraj and Dhunwakot. (Note: The English translation of royal orders is as below: We have sent orders to impress jhara labor for the construction of a fort there. Send troops (tilanga) to round up jhara laborers and construct a fort (gadhi) and checkposts (thana). Construct the fort at a side north of the Pyuthan palace which should be broad and elevated. Use hard and durable stones procured from quarries for such construction and make the foundations strong. Dig a tank inside the fort with lime mortar so that sufficient water may be available. Erect palisades with deep foundations and built stockades and embankments. Maintain adequate ammunition may have to be stocked inside the palace as well. Undertake repairs regularly. Construct durable checkposts at Sheoraj and Dhunwakot also. We have received reports that the ford (sanghu) on the Madi river has been damaged; repair it. Construct a strong ford (phatukya) on the lower reaches of the Phorya-Khola also. Since no labor will be available for elephant hunts if jhara labor is impressed from the local people for these construction projects, we have, sent orders to impress such labor in other areas. Allot work according to the area and the projects. Bhadra Badi 11, 1853 (August 1796))

An administrative document from Jumla dated Chaitra Sudi 7, 1857 (April 1801) shows ‘’Subba’’ Ranajit's administrative order to Alidatta Jaisi of Sija to restore the revenue assignment for Kanakasundari temple which was discontinued by the Amali (i.e. local administrator). Similarly, document dated Chaitra Sudi 7, 1857 (April 1801) and Jestha Badi 1, 1858 (May 1801) shows his tax exemption and land allotment decisions as a Subba (governor). On Baisakh Sudi 10, 1861 V.S. (May 1804), the royal orders from King Girvan Yuddha Bikram Shah instructed Sardar Ranajit Kunwar along with Sardar Angad Khawas and Subedar Nirbhaya Simha Thapa to investigate the conflict between King Samundra Sen of Bajhang and King Mandhir Shah of Bajura and take over the areas by military means and deport the obstructer to the capital.

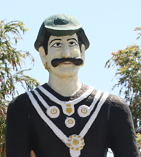
Bada Kaji Amar Singh Thapa, Overall Commander at Battle of Khadbuda 1804 CE

King Pradyumna Shah of Garhwal Kingdom prepared for warfare by assembling 12,000 men of various groups such as Ramghads, Pundirs, Gurjars, and Rajputs under a Gujjar Sardar Ramdayal Singh of Landhaur. On the other hand, Gorkhali forces were led by overall commander Amar Singh Thapa, and his subordinate commanders Bhaktibir Thapa and Ranajit Kunwar. The battle took place at Khadbuda on 22nd Marga 1860 V.S. (January 1804). Pradyumna Shah on his horseback was having a conversation with Miya Dulal Singh of Prithvipur and momentarily, Ranajit shot Pradyumna Shah to death. His shot proved successful as Garhwali soldiers ran away and the war finally ended. Bada Amar Simha appointed Ranajit as chief of one of the three revenue divisions of Garhwal namely Srinagar. The letter sent on Sunday, Bhadra Sudi 11, 1867 V.S. by Ranajit Kunwar to Bhimsen Thapa states his involvements in the western provinces of Kingdom of Nepal. Ranajit reports to the Bhimsen regarding the enemy forces of Barha Thakurai kings at Panthajada and war preparations by Gorkhali companies at Panthajada. He further reports the submission of Terai region by Sikh Maharaja Ranjit Singh and subsequent hostility by hill Rajas towards Gorkhalis. Ranajit also mentions that his son Rewanta Kunwar wrote about the then existing economic problems in military management at Kumaun region. (Note: The English translation of the letter by Historian Dinesh Raj Pant is as below: From Ranajit Kunwar, To Kaji Bhimsen Thapa. Greetings. All is well there, and I wish the same there. The news here is good. Information about the situation prevailing here had been given in the previous latter. The enemy, who had proceeded through Panthajada, had not advanced farther. Our Sardars and companies are making preparations to attack him. the position of the western kingdoms remains the same as before. As regards the Madhesh region, we have received reports that Ranajit Singh has vacated the fort as well as the territories (Parganna) that he had occupied, when the British made a request to that effect on the basis of a complaint submitted by Baghal Singh. Ranajit Singh is now trying to organize a united front of the Marhattas, the Sikhs, and the hill Rajas, on the ground that otherwise, the British will assume supreme authority. The hill Rajas, on their part want to start a quarrel with us. I shall report on whatever, developments take place. I have learnt from the letter sent by the boys that Rewanta Kunwar has been graciously deputed to Kumaun, we count have accomplished everything through the grace of His Majesty and your support. We tried to act according to royal orders. Not to please other people. In Kumaun, Rewanta was becoming a victim of intrigue, and that was why we had petitioned for his transfer. We are here acting according to the orders of the Budha Kaji (Ambara Simha Thapa), as we had been directed under royal instructions. Rewanta writes, "Not to talk in increasing the strength of the Barakh Company by four platoons (Patte), even the two existing platoons that have been created are not being able to receive their emoluments. Because .... In his battalion (Paltan), no order has been issued to charge our increased allowances (on the revenues of) Kumaun. The Kaji has clearly stated that he has not received any order to allot lands in this region. Because of the large number of Sardars, it is not proper for us to remain in the army like ordinary persons. I have represented my problems before you, and will do whatever you advise. Hoping that you will continue giving me advice, and informing me about your welfare. Sunday, Bhadra Sudi 11 (1867) Camp: Sugathor.)

On Ashadh Sudi 1, 1870, General Bhimsen Thapa was granted 30 ropanis and 5 annas of land at Lagantol under inheritable Birta-Bitalab tenure for the construction of a house. Among the Bharadars (courtiers) who were present for the demarcation of the boundary, Kaji Ranajit Kunwar was also present there. As a Kaji, Ranajit issued administrative order to Chautariyas Atmarama Padhya and Tilakarama Padhya of Udayapur in Pyuthan to restore Hulak (mail) posts and repair suspension bridges at Arthala as per the letter dated Bhadra Badi 14, 1871 V.S.

== Allowances, Grants and Levies ==
Kaji Ranajit Kanwar received NRs 1000 allowance while working as military commander in Kumaun region in 1866 Vikram Samvat. He received 200 muris of land grants on Manachamal tenure by a royal order was issued in Aswin Badi 13, 1862. Ranajit was among the highest ranked Bharadar (state-bearing officer) of the government of Nepal in the year 1861 Vikram Samvat (1804/05 CE). Thus, he was charged NRs. 272.25 as special Salami levy to repay the loans incurred by former King Rana Bahadur Shah during the four year (1800-1804 CE) stay at Banaras.

== Death ==
As per Rana genealogy mentioned by Christopher Buyers, he died from the wounds received in the assault of the Jhabesar in Kangra on 1815 A.D. Chronicler Daniel Wright contends that Ranajit died in the conquest of Kangra while storming at Jhapabesar in Kumaon. He was hit by a bullet in the right chest aged 58 years when he was climbing a bamboo ladder at the wall.

== Descendants ==
The table produced by Kumar Pradhan shows the three sons of Ranajit - Bal Narsingh Kunwar, Balaram and Rewant. Bal Narsingh Kunwar was a political aide of Bhimsen Thapa. His son Jung Bahadur Kunwar became Prime Minister of Nepal. The appointment letter of Jung Bahadur Kunwar as Prime Minister of Nepal, confirms that he was son of Bal Narsingh Kunwar and a grandson of Ranajit Kunwar. The appointment of Bam Bahadur Kunwar as Kaji also mentions Bal Narsingh Kunwar as his father and Ranajit Kunwar as his grandfather. After proclaiming descent from Ranas of Mewar, Jung Bahadur Kunwar adopted the title of Kunwar Ranaji on 15 May 1848 and became Maharaja (Great King) of Kaski and Lamjung on 6 August 1856.

== Footnotes ==
=== References ===
- Acharya, Baburam (January 1, 1971), "The Fall Of Bhimsen Thapa And The Rise Of Jung Bahadur Rana" (PDF), Regmi Research Series, 3 (1): 13–25
- Regmi, Mahesh Chandra (June 1, 1971), "Allowances Of Military Personal In Kumaun and Garhwal" (PDF), Regmi Research Series, 3 (6): 145–148
- Regmi, Mahesh Chandra (January 1, 1974), "Bajura Rajya" (PDF), Regmi Research Series, 6 (1): 17–20
- Pant, Dinesh Raj (September 1, 1975), "Ranajit Kunwar's Letters to Bhimsen Thapa" (PDF), Regmi Research Series, 7 (9): 161–163
- Regmi, Mahesh Chandra (December 1, 1975), "Miscellaneous Documents on the Bheri-Mahakali Region" (PDF), Regmi Research Series, 7 (12): 221–223
- Acharya, Baburam (October 1, 1978), "Jung Bahadur" (PDF), Regmi Research Series, 10 (10): 145
- Kusum, Govind (June 1, 1979) [1978], "Udayapur" (PDF), Regmi Research Series, 11 (6): 81–82
- Regmi, Mahesh Chandra (February 1986a), "Royal Orders of Bhadra 1853" (PDF), Regmi Research Series, 18 (2): 24–30
- Bhandari, Devi Prasad (May 1986b), "The Regency of Bahadur Shah" (PDF), Regmi Research Series, 18 (5): 65–71
- Regmi, Mahesh Chandra (January 1987a), "The Royal Family of Jumla" (PDF), Regmi Research Series, 19 (1): 8–9
- Dabaral, Shiva Prasad “Charan” (March 1987a), "The Rape of Garhwal" (PDF), Regmi Research Series, 19 (3): 37–40
- Regmi, Mahesh Chandra (May 1987b), "Rebellion in Jumla" (PDF), Regmi Research Series, 19 (5): 61–63
- Dabaral, Shiva Prasad “Charan” (July–August 1987b), "Gorkhali rule in Garhwal" (PDF), Regmi Research Series, 19 (7–8): 115–120
- Regmi, Mahesh Chandra (November–December 1987c), "Selected Documents of Aswin 1862" (PDF), Regmi Research Series, 19 (11–12): 175–180
- Regmi, Mahesh Chandra (March 1988a), "Ran Bahadur Shah's Expenses in Banaras" (PDF), Regmi Research Series, 20 (3): 31–37
- Regmi, Mahesh Chandra (September 1988b), "Jung Bahadur Kunwar" (PDF), Regmi Research Series, 20 (8): 127
- Regmi, Mahesh Chandra (November 1988c), "Miscellaneous Land Grants" (PDF), Regmi Research Series, 20 (11): 151–155
- Pradhan, Kumar L. (2012), Thapa Politics in Nepal: With Special Reference to Bhim Sen Thapa, 1806–1839, New Delhi: Concept Publishing Company, ISBN 9788180698132
- Acharya, Baburam (2012), Acharya, Shri Krishna (ed.), Janaral Bhimsen Thapa : Yinko Utthan Tatha Pattan (in Nepali), Kathmandu: Education Book House, p. 228, ISBN 9789937241748
- Whelpton, John (1991). Kings, soldiers, and priests: Nepalese politics and the rise of Jang Bahadur Rana, 1830-1857. Manohar Publications. ISBN 9788185425641.
- Institute of Nepal Asian Studies (INAS) (1996). Contributions to Nepalese studies. Vol. 23–24. Tribhuvan University.
- Wright, Daniel (1877), History of Nepal, Cambridge University Press
- Regmi, D. R. (1983). Inscriptions of ancient Nepal. New Delhi: Abhinav Publications. ISBN 978-0391025592.
