= Nain Singh Thapa =

Nepalese Kaji (minister) and a military general

General Kaji Nain Singh Thapa
- जनरल काजी नैनसिंह थापा
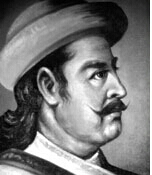
- Portrait of Thapa Kaji Nain Singh

Personal details
- Born: c. AD 1777 Borlang, Gorkha district
- Died: 1728 Saka Era (1806/07 AD) Kangra Fort, Garhwal Kingdom
- Children: Mathabar Singh Thapa, Queen Tripurasundari of Nepal, Ujir Singh Thapa, Ganesh Kumari (mother of Jung Bahadur Rana)
- Parents: Amar Singh Thapa (sardar) (father); Satyarupa Maya (mother)
- Relatives: Bhimsen Thapa (brother); Ranajit Pande (father-in-law); Balbhadra Kunwar (nephew); Jang Bahadur Rana (grandson)

Military service
- Allegiance: Nepal
- Rank: General
- Battles/wars: Battles of Unification of Nepal

Nain Singh Thapa or Nayan Singh Thapa (Nepali: नैनसिंह थापा/नयनसिंह थापा) (died late 1806 or early 1807) was a Nepalese Kaji (minister) and a military general. He died in the offensive campaign of Kangra from bullet injury. He was the owner of the Thapathali Durbar temple complex.

== Career ==
He was a Kaji and General of Nepal Army. A royal order was decreed on Ashwin Sudi 2, 1862 V.S. (September 1805), for the preparations of the Kangra campaign. In September 1805, while being deputed at Kangra Fort, his brother Mukhtiyar Bhimsen Thapa ordered him to arrest military deserters. Gorkhali forces under Badakaji Amar Singh Thapa, Rudrabir [Shah] and Nain Singh overran Nalagarh and crossed Sutlej River. They fought against and defeated King Sansar Chand at Mahal Mori in May 1806. Sansar Chand fled to Kangra fort after taking refuge at Sujanpur Tira. Widow of Kirti Chand, Commander of Kangra Army and Nain Singh, the Nepalese commander led the battle at Tira Sujanpur. The Gorkhali invasion became persistent and irresistible. On Saturday V.S. 1863 Kartik Badi 13 (i.e. 8 November 1806), there was a letter which positioned Bhakti Thapa under the joint authority of Badakaji Amar Singh Thapa and Nain Singh. Nain Singh came with a reinforcement of 1500 men along with Sardar Udatta Shahi leading 3 companies while Subba Ranganath Gurung and Prahlad Gurung had led 4 companies. Nain Singh and Amar Singh were entrusted with the main Nain Singh fought at Kangra fort and was mortally wounded from which he died in the winter of 1806/1807. The Bhasavamshawali also states the death of Nain Singh on 1728 Saka Era i.e. (1806/7) A.D. The event was sketched by 19th-century Garhwali poet and painter Mola Ram. In an 1852 interview, Jang Bahadur Rana mentioned the death of his maternal grandfather Nain Singh at Kangra.

== Family tree ==
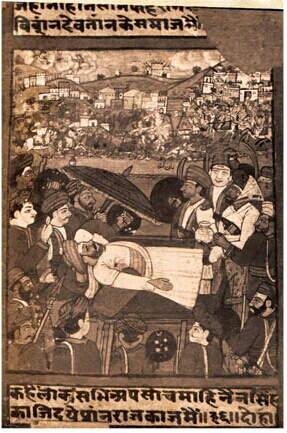
Poem, and portrait of the event of the death of Kaji Nain Singh Thapa in the conquest of Garhwal, by Garhwali Poet Mola Ram

He was born as second son to Sanukaji Amar Singh Thapa. Nayan Singh Thapa had 4 brothers – Bhimsen Thapa, Bhaktawar Singh, Amrit Singh and Ranbir Singh and two step-brothers – Ranzawar and Ranbam. He was father of Mathabarsingh Thapa, Queen Tripurasundari of Nepal and grandfather of Jung Bahadur Rana. He was the son-in-law of Chief Kazi Ranajit Pande of noble Pande family and father-in-law of Kazi Bal Narsingh Kunwar of the noble Kunwar Rana family. Kumar Pradhan asserts that Sher Jung Thapa was son of Nain Singh Thapa, whom Bhimsen adopted while Baburam Acharya contradicts that Sher Jung Thapa was nephew of Mathabarsingh Thapa and was sixteen years old in April 1835.

Nain Singh Thapa	Rana Kumari Pande
Ganesh Kumari*	Queen Tripurasundari of Nepal (born 1794)	Ujir Singh Thapa (born 1796)	Mathabarsingh Thapa (born 1798)
Ranojjwal Singh Thapa	Bikram Singh Thapa	Amar Singh Thapa II

- Ganesh Kumari is mother of Jung Bahadur Rana, founder of Rana dynasty.

He was the owner of Thapathali Durbar.

== Sources ==
- Pradhan, Kumar L. (2012), Thapa Politics in Nepal: With Special Reference to Bhim Sen Thapa, 1806–1839, New Delhi: Concept Publishing Company, p. 278, ISBN 9788180698132
- Acharya, Baburam (2012), Acharya, Shri Krishna (ed.), Janaral Bhimsen Thapa : Yinko Utthan Tatha Pattan (in Nepali), Kathmandu: Education Book House, p. 228, ISBN 9789937241748
- Regmi, Mahesh Chandra (1999). Imperial Gorkha: sn account of Gorkhali rule in Kumaun (1791-1814). Adroit Publications. ISBN 9788187392026.
- Whelpton, John (1991). Kings, soldiers, and priests: Nepalese politics and the rise of Jang Bahadur Rana, 1830-1857. Manohar Publications. p. 254. ISBN 9788185425641.
- Hamal, Lakshman B. (1995). Military history of Nepal. Sharda Pustak Mandir. p. 125. OCLC 32779233.
- Shaha, Rishikesh (1982). Essays in the Practice of Government in Nepal. Manohar. p. 44. OCLC 9302577.
- Datta, Chaman Lal (1997). The raj and the Simla Hill states: socio-economic problems, agrarian disturbances and paramountcy. ABS Publications. ISBN 9788170720720.
- Punjabi University (1988). Proceedings, Volume 21. Punjabi University.
- Lal, Prem Hari Har (1993). The Doon Valley Down the Ages. Dehradun, India: Interprint. ISBN 9788185017648.
- D.R. Regmi (1975). Modern Nepal vol.1. Firma KL Mukhopadhyay. ISBN 9780883864913.
- Institute of Nepal and Asian Studies (1985). Contributions to Nepalese studies, Volumes 13-14. Institute of Nepal and Asian Studies, Tribhuvan University.
