= Queen Tripurasundari of Nepal =

Tripurasundari
- Queen consort of Nepal; Queen regent of Nepal
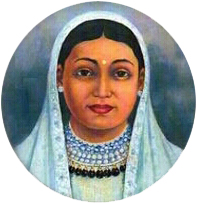
- Portrait of Tripurasundari
- Born: 1794; Kingdom of Nepal
- Died: 6 April 1832 (aged 37–38); Hanuman Dhoka Palace, Kathmandu, Kingdom of Nepal
- Spouse: Rana Bahadur Shah
Names
- Lalit Tripura Sundari Devi
- Dynasty: Shah dynasty (by marriage); Thapa dynasty (by birth)
- Father: Nain Singh Thapa
- Mother: Rana Kumari Pandey
- Religion: Hinduism

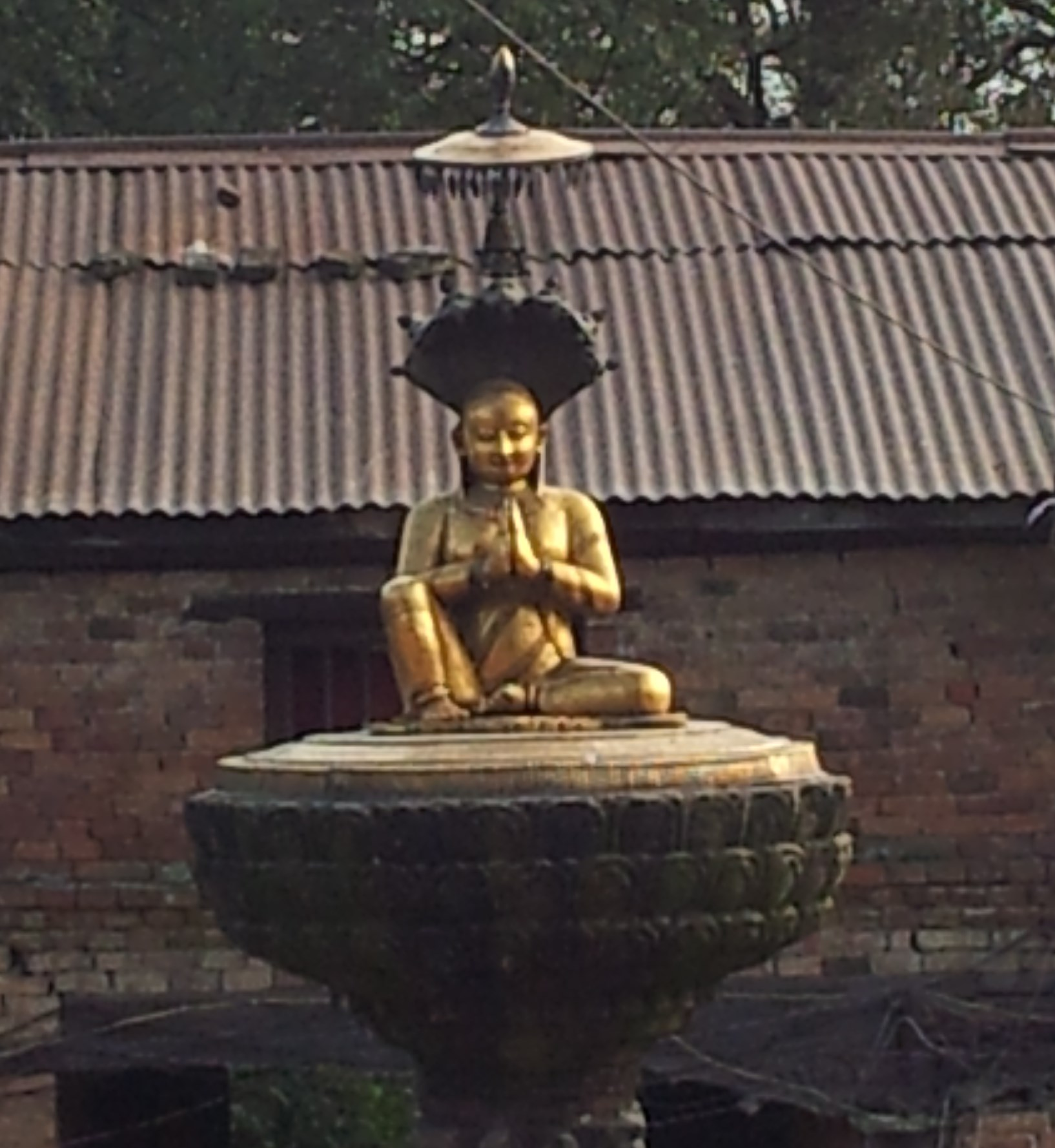
Statue of Queen Tripurasundari

Tripurasundari (Nepali: रानी ललित त्रिपुरासुन्दरी; 1794 – 6 April 1832), also known as Lalit Tripura Sundari Devi, was a queen consort of Nepal by marriage to King Rana Bahadur Shah of Nepal. Widowed at a very young age and childless, she served as regent of the kingdom for a long period. She was regent for her stepson Girvan Yuddha Bikram Shah in 1806–1819, and for her step-grandson Rajendra in 1819–1832. She was the first woman to publish literature in Nepal.

== Biography ==
Lalit Tripura Sundari Devi was born into an influential Nepali family to the feudal military elite of the kingdom. As per historical records, Tripurasundari was from the Thapa family, and the daughter of Bhimsen Thapa's brother Nain Singh Thapa. Her siblings included Mathabarsingh Thapa (sometime Prime Minister of Nepal) and Ganesh Kumari Devi, the mother of Jung Bahadur Rana who founded the Rana hegemony over Nepal which lasted over 100 years (1846–1950).

In 1805 or 1806, Tripurasundari married the king of Nepal, Rana Bahadur Shah. She was the youngest wife of the king. At the time, Bahadur Shah was serving as mukhtiyar (executive) for his son and successor, Girvan Yuddha Bikram Shah. One year later, Rana Bahadur Shah was assassinated by his half-brother. Tripurasundari and Rana Bahadur Shah did not have children.

=== Regency ===
After Rana Bahadur Shah was assassinated in 1806, Queen Rajeshwari, who acted as the regent for her stepson Girvan Yuddha Bikram Shah, was forced to commit sati. As such, Tripurasundari became the regent for their stepson. Girvan Yuddha Bikram Shah died in 1816, before he could take power, and his infant son Rajendra became the king. Tripurasundari also served as regent during the minority of Rajendra.

She was a staunch supporter of Bhimsen Thapa, who may have been her relative. As the acting regent, she influenced Bhimsen's position as the Prime Minister of Nepal for over 25 years, from 1806 to 1832. During her regency for Girvan Yuddha, Tripurasundari issued a mandate that all members of the court must obey Bhimsen.

She died of cholera on 6 April 1832, during a widespread cholera epidemic in Kathmandu. She died the same year that Rajendra ascended to power, and her death decreased Bhimsen's political control.

== Literary works ==
Tripurasundari was the first woman to publish literature in Nepali. She translated some parts of Shantiparva from the Sanskrit Mahabharata into Nepali and published it as Rajdharma, a treatise on the duties and responsibilities of a king, in 1824. Rajdharma has been praised by historians as "a credit to Nepal's language and literature."

She had also written many other poems in Nepali. She also encouraged writers and poets in her court, and, with her encouragement, her stepson Girvan Yuddha Bikram Shah and step grandson Rajendra Bikram Shah each wrote three books.

== Structures and monuments ==
The construction of Dharahara was commissioned by either Tripurasundari or Bhimsen Thapa on her behalf. The tower collapsed in the 2015 Nepal earthquake, and now has been reconstructed. She also commissioned the Tripureshwor Mahadev temple at Tripureshwor and the bridge between Kathmandu and Lalitpur at Thapathali.
