= Rudra Shumsher Jung Bahadur Rana =

Nepalese military commander and administrator

- रुद्र शमशेर जङ्गबहादुर राणा
- Field Marshal Rudra Shumsher Jung Bahadur Rana

Commander-in-Chief of the Nepalese Army
- In office 1932 – 18 March 1934
- Preceded by: Juddha Shumsher Jung Bahadur Rana
- Succeeded by: Padma Shumsher Jung Bahadur Rana

Tainathwalla of Palpa
- In office 1934–1951

Personal details
- Born: Kingdom of Nepal
- Parent: Bir Shumsher Jung Bahadur Rana (father)
- Relatives: Purushottam Shumsher Jung Bahadur Rana (grandson)
- Occupation: Military officer, administrator

Military service
- Allegiance: Kingdom of Nepal

Rudra Shumsher Jung Bahadur Rana (रुद्र शमशेर जङ्गबहादुर राणा), also written as Rudra Shamsher Jung Bahadur Rana, was a Nepalese military officer and administrator of the Rana dynasty. He served as commander-in-chief of the Nepalese Army and was formerly in line to succeed to the hereditary office of Prime Minister of Nepal. In March 1934, Prime Minister Juddha Shumsher Jung Bahadur Rana removed him from the Rana succession roll during a purge of the family's C-class members and sent him to Palpa District as its senior administrator.

Rana subsequently served as the Tainathwalla, or senior administrative and military officer, of Palpa from 1934 until the overthrow of Rana rule in 1951. His administration was responsible for supervising government offices, maintaining security and implementing instructions from the central government. Although his political seniority gave him considerable prestige, historical research based on contemporary government correspondence demonstrates that his administrative authority remained subject to close supervision from Kathmandu.

During the preparations for the 1950–1951 Nepalese revolution, Rana was approached by B. P. Koirala, who sought his cooperation in a plan to move King Tribhuvan to Palpa and obtain the support of troops stationed there. Koirala later described their discussions in interviews published by Bhola Chatterji.

Rana was also associated with Char Burja Durbar in Kathmandu, a palace originally given to him by his father. The property was confiscated following his removal from the succession in 1934 and subsequently transferred to another branch of the Rana family.

== Early life and family background ==
Rudra Shumsher Jung Bahadur Rana was a son of Bir Shumsher Jung Bahadur Rana, who served as hereditary prime minister of Nepal from 1885 to 1901.

His family belonged to the Shumsher branch of the Rana dynasty, whose members dominated Nepal's government and senior military administration from the late nineteenth century until the fall of Rana rule in 1951.

The Shumsher branch emerged as the ruling faction following the 1885 overthrow and assassination of Prime Minister Ranodip Singh Kunwar.

Bir Shumsher subsequently established his family in the senior positions of the government, and his sons were placed within the hereditary political and military hierarchy.

Rudra Shumsher's political position was influenced by the Rana succession system, under which senior offices were allocated according to a hereditary roll rather than ordinary parliamentary or executive appointment.

The hereditary system also distinguished members of the ruling family according to the status of their parents' marriage and their maternal lineage.

Rana was among the members classified as C-class in the family succession system. Historian John Whelpton describes him as a son of Bir Shumsher who had remained eligible for the premiership under the arrangements established before subsequent restrictions on succession.

The precise date and place of Rudra Shumsher's birth are not consistently documented in the historical publications used for this article.

== Military and political career ==
=== Position within the Rana succession system ===
The Rana government combined hereditary political leadership with senior military and administrative office.

Under the system, the prime minister also held the title of Maharaja, while the next most senior members of the family occupied positions such as commander-in-chief and regional commanding general.

The commander-in-chief occupied an especially important position because the officeholder was normally the next person in line to succeed the prime minister.

Rana rose through the military and political hierarchy during the first decades of the twentieth century.

During the premiership of Juddha Shumsher Jung Bahadur Rana, he became commander-in-chief and successor-designate to the hereditary premiership.

His seniority placed him ahead of several other members of the family, including Padma Shumsher Jung Bahadur Rana and Mohan Shumsher Jung Bahadur Rana, both of whom subsequently became prime ministers.

=== Visit to Britain in 1908 ===
Rana accompanied Prime Minister Chandra Shumsher Jung Bahadur Rana during his visit to Britain in 1908.

British Foreign Office records reproduced by researcher Sam Cowan list him as a commanding general in the Nepalese delegation.

The delegation included senior Rana military and political figures, including Juddha Shumsher, Mohan Shumsher and Baber Shumsher.

Cowan's historical account draws on British government archives and records preserved by the University of Oxford and the Bodleian Library.

=== Commander-in-chief ===
Following the accession of Juddha Shumsher to the premiership in 1932, Rudra Shumsher held the position of commander-in-chief of the Nepalese Army.

The position reflected both his military rank and his place within the hereditary succession.

John Whelpton identifies Rana as Juddha Shumsher's intended successor before the political purge of March 1934.

The position placed him at the center of the rivalry between different branches of the Rana family, whose members competed for succession rights and control of senior government offices.

== Removal from the succession and exile ==
=== Background of the 1934 purge ===
Rivalry over succession intensified during the administrations of Chandra Shumsher Jung Bahadur Rana and Bhim Shumsher Jung Bahadur Rana.

In 1920, Chandra Shumsher introduced a classification system dividing members of the Rana family into A, B and C categories according to their maternal ancestry and the recognized status of their parents' marriage.

The distinction affected eligibility for the hereditary premiership and senior offices.

According to historian John Whelpton, Chandra Shumsher restricted the addition of C-class descendants to the succession roll but did not remove those who had already been included.

Consequently, Rudra Shumsher and other senior members retained their places within the hereditary succession despite later restrictions on eligibility.

By the time Juddha Shumsher became prime minister, the presence of C-class members on the succession roll had become a source of conflict with other branches of the ruling family.

=== Purge of 18 March 1934 ===
On 18 March 1934, approximately two months after the 1934 Nepal–India earthquake, Juddha Shumsher summoned senior Rana family members to a meeting at Singha Durbar in Kathmandu.

According to Whelpton, the building was surrounded by troops, and Juddha Shumsher entered the meeting carrying pistols. He ordered the removal of Rudra Shumsher and the other affected C-class Rana members from the succession roll.

Most of those removed were subsequently required to live outside Kathmandu, while several received appointments as district governors.

Rudra Shumsher was removed from his position as commander-in-chief and sent to Palpa.

The purge ended his position as a prospective successor to the Rana premiership.

Whelpton suggests that Juddha Shumsher's decision was influenced by the increasingly serious divisions between branches of the family, together with concerns about political stability and the succession rights of his own descendants.

The removal took place during the reconstruction period following the 1934 earthquake.

=== Confiscation of property ===
The removal from the succession also had consequences for Rudra Shumsher's property in Kathmandu.

A historical account published by Onlinekhabar in 2019, drawing on Pramod Shumsher Rana's book Rana Shasanko Britanta and interviews with Rudra Shumsher's descendants, describes the confiscation of his personal possessions and the Char Burja Durbar estate.

The account states that the palace and other valuable possessions were taken over under the authority of Juddha Shumsher.

Char Burja Durbar was subsequently transferred to Juddha Shumsher's son, Bahadur Shumsher, after whom the property became known as Bahadur Bhawan.

The circumstances of the confiscation have remained a subject of discussion in historical accounts and among descendants of the former owners.

== Administration of Palpa ==
=== Appointment as Tainathwalla ===
Following his removal from Kathmandu in 1934, Rudra Shumsher was appointed Tainathwalla of Palpa, also described as the Bada Hakim or senior regional administrator.

Palpa was an important administrative and military center in western Nepal.

The Tainathwalla was responsible for supervising government offices, overseeing the enforcement of laws, maintaining public order and directing troops stationed in the district.

Rana remained in the position from 1934 until the overthrow of the Rana regime in 1951, becoming the last official to hold the Palpa Tainathwalla appointment under the hereditary Rana administration.

=== Administrative responsibilities ===
The government of Palpa included offices responsible for revenue collection, security, customs, military supplies and general administration.

The Tainathwalla supervised these institutions and communicated their reports and requests to the central authorities.

Rana's responsibilities included the supervision of the district's military establishment and the enforcement of instructions issued by the government in Kathmandu.

His authority was extensive in practical terms, particularly because of the distance between Palpa and Kathmandu and the difficulties of communication and transportation.

However, the Tainathwalla was not an independent ruler and remained responsible to the central government.

=== Relations with Kathmandu ===
In a study published in Kailash: A Journal of Himalayan Studies in 1976, researcher Dan Edwards examined the relationship between the Palpa administration and the central Rana government.

Drawing on contemporary official correspondence, laws and administrative regulations, Edwards concluded that Kathmandu maintained considerable control over the district, even during Rudra Shumsher's administration.

According to Edwards, the central government monitored officials through reports, petitions, inspections and confidential investigations.

The Tainathwalla could make some minor administrative appointments, but important appointments, major financial expenditures and significant government decisions required approval from the central authorities.

This arrangement limited the possibility of the Palpa administration operating as an autonomous political establishment.

=== Investigation of officials in 1940 ===
One incident documented by Edwards involved an investigation of misconduct among local officials in Palpa during 1940.

The central authorities had received allegations involving officials and clerks in the district.

Rudra Shumsher was directed to investigate and report on the allegations.

When he reported that no misconduct had been established, the government sent its own confidential investigators.

The investigators produced evidence of improper conduct, leading Prime Minister Juddha Shumsher to order the immediate dismissal of ten officials.

According to Edwards's account of the official correspondence, Rudra Shumsher was criticized for failing to identify the misconduct during his original investigation.

The central investigators did not establish that Rudra Shumsher himself had participated in the wrongdoing.

The episode illustrates the supervision of the Palpa administration by the central government.

=== Financial and personnel authority ===
Edwards also documented restrictions on the financial authority of the Tainathwalla.

For example, in 1940 Rudra Shumsher requested funding for additional clerical personnel to organize government records.

The central administration approved a smaller allocation and a shorter period of employment than he had requested.

Similarly, his power to appoint military and civilian personnel was restricted to specified lower ranks. Senior appointments required approval from the central authorities.

These limitations applied even though Rudra Shumsher had previously held one of the highest positions within the Rana government.

== Role during the 1950–1951 revolution ==
=== Contacts with the Nepali Congress ===
During the late 1940s and early 1950s, the opposition movement against the Rana administration gained strength.

The Nepali Congress and associated political activists prepared an armed uprising against the hereditary regime.

Rudra Shumsher's position as the senior military and administrative officer in Palpa made him a potential source of support for the revolutionary movement.

In interviews published in Bhola Chatterji's Portrait of a Revolutionary: B. P. Koirala, B. P. Koirala described secretly visiting Palpa to meet Rudra Shumsher.

According to Koirala's recollection, Rudra Shumsher agreed to cooperate with a plan involving the transfer of King Tribhuvan from Kathmandu to Palpa.

Koirala estimated that approximately 1,200 troops stationed in Palpa might provide military support if the proposed operation succeeded.

=== Proposed transfer of King Tribhuvan ===
The plan described by Koirala involved moving King Tribhuvan away from the control of the ruling Rana authorities in Kathmandu.

Palpa was considered a possible destination because of its military establishment and the willingness of Rudra Shumsher to cooperate.

Koirala stated that the planners considered obtaining a helicopter to facilitate the king's escape.

However, they were unable to obtain the necessary aircraft, and the proposed transfer to Palpa was not carried out.

The account represents Koirala's retrospective recollection of the preparations for the revolution rather than documentation of a completed military operation.

=== Political transition in Palpa ===
The 1950–1951 Nepalese revolution ultimately resulted in the end of the Rana family's hereditary monopoly over the premiership.

Palpa became one of the locations affected by the revolutionary movement in western Nepal.

A review of Matrika Prasad Koirala's memoir A Role in a Revolution, published in Studies in Nepali History and Society in 2008, identifies B. P. Koirala's successful contact with Rudra Shumsher as one of the episodes discussed in the memoir.

A historical account published by Tansen Municipality also describes contacts between the revolutionary movement and the Palpa administration, as well as the changing control of the district during the final months of Rana rule.

The dissolution of the hereditary Rana administration in 1951 brought an end to Rudra Shumsher's tenure as Tainathwalla of Palpa.

== Char Burja Durbar and Bahadur Bhawan ==
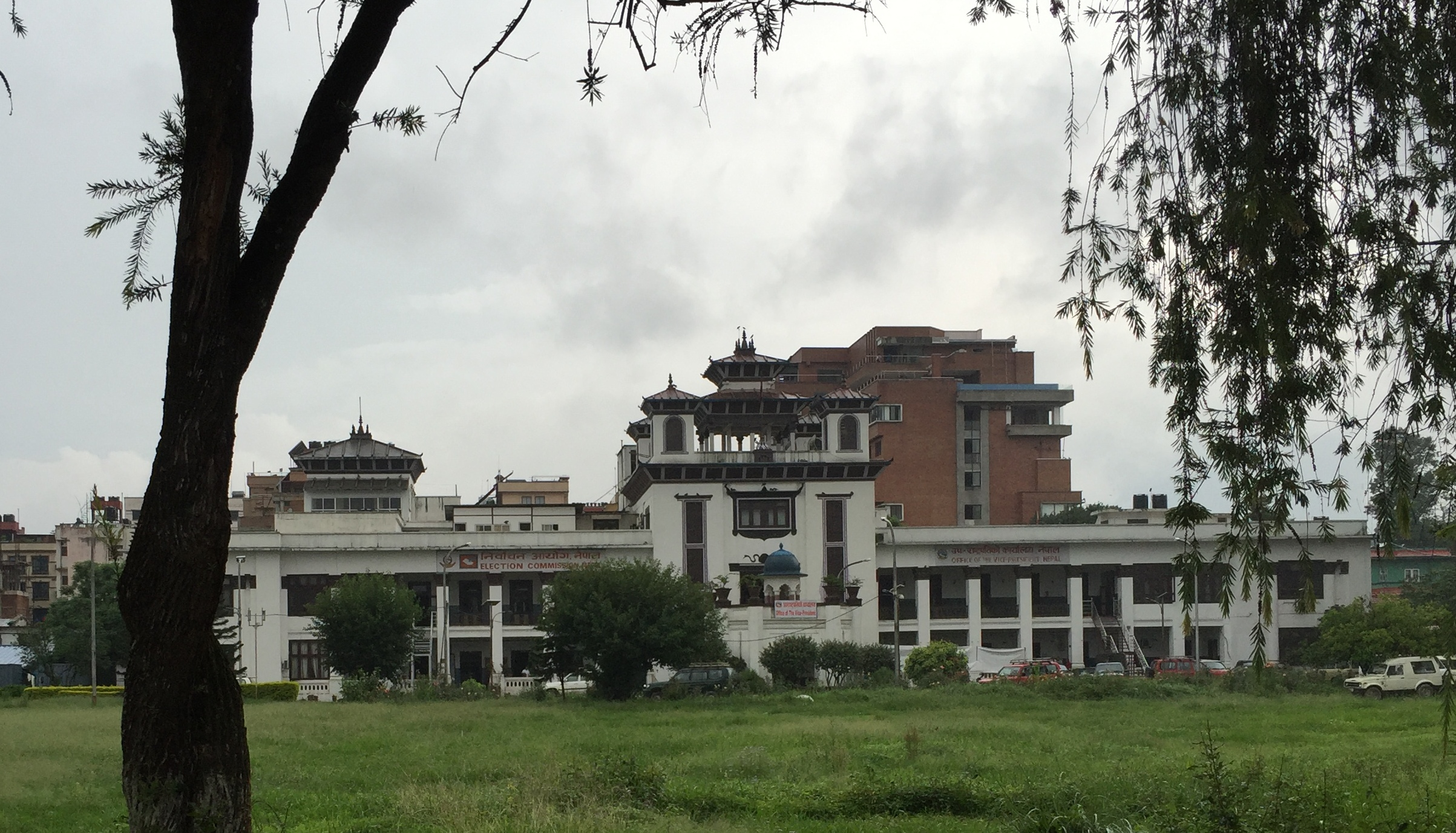
Bahadur Bhawan

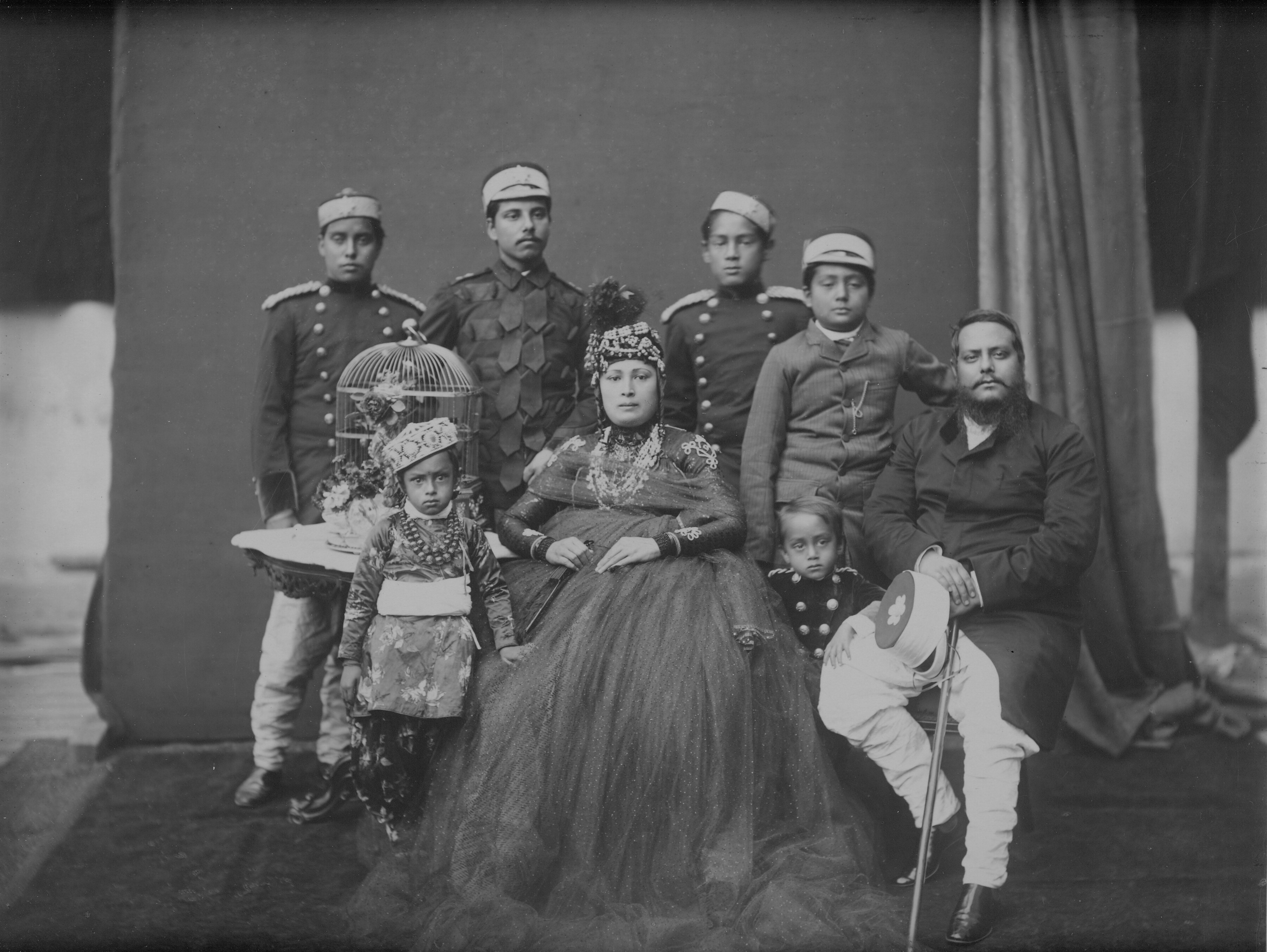
Prime Minister Bir Shumsher Jung Bahadur Rana with his wife and sons, including Rudra Shumsher. Photograph taken before 1901.

Rudra Shumsher was associated with Char Burja Durbar, a palace in Kathmandu originally constructed during the premiership of his father, Bir Shumsher.

The building was given to Rudra Shumsher as part of the family's royal properties.

According to historical reporting, a fire in 1905 destroyed much of the original palace, after which Rudra Shumsher rebuilt it.

The palace was designed in a neoclassical architectural style, with four prominent corner towers that gave rise to the name Char Burja Durbar.

The palace was confiscated following Rudra Shumsher's removal from the succession in 1934.

It was subsequently transferred to Bahadur Shumsher Jung Bahadur Rana, a son of Juddha Shumsher, and became known as Bahadur Bhawan.

In later decades, the property was used for other purposes, including as a hotel, before becoming a government building.

The former palace now houses the Election Commission of Nepal.

In interviews published in 2019, Rudra Shumsher's descendants described the family's continuing dissatisfaction over the confiscation of the property.

Those accounts also document the difficulties faced by the family following its removal from Kathmandu in 1934.

== Family ==
Rudra Shumsher belonged to the family of Prime Minister Bir Shumsher Jung Bahadur Rana.

Members of the extended family occupied military, administrative and diplomatic positions during the Rana period.

His son, Ishwar Shumsher Jung Bahadur Rana, accompanied the family during its relocation to Palpa.

His grandson, Purushottam Shumsher Jung Bahadur Rana, was born at Char Burja Durbar in 1926 and later became a historian and writer whose works addressed the history of the Rana dynasty.

In a 2024 obituary, Kantipur identified Purushottam as the son of Ishwar Shumsher and the grandson of Rudra Shumsher.

Purushottam later wrote several historical works, including books on the Rana prime ministers and the palaces of Kathmandu.

His recollections of childhood in Palpa have contributed to published accounts of the family's exile and the political developments of the period.

== Later recognition and historical significance ==
Rudra Shumsher's career illustrates the political instability within the Rana hereditary system during its final decades.

Although he occupied a senior position in the military and was designated as a potential successor to the premiership, he was removed from the succession by another member of the ruling family.

His subsequent administration in Palpa provides an example of the relationship between hereditary Rana elites and the central state.

Dan Edwards's research demonstrates that senior Rana administrators could possess considerable local prestige while remaining subject to strict supervision by Kathmandu.

Rudra Shumsher's contacts with B. P. Koirala during the preparations for the 1950 revolution also connect his later career with the opposition movement that ultimately brought an end to hereditary Rana rule.

He has been described in historical and family accounts as a field marshal, although published sources differ regarding the timing and circumstances of this rank.

== See also ==
- Rana dynasty
- Bir Shumsher Jung Bahadur Rana
- Juddha Shumsher Jung Bahadur Rana
- Chandra Shumsher Jung Bahadur Rana
- Padma Shumsher Jung Bahadur Rana
- Chief of the Nepalese Army
- List of field marshals in Nepal
- Palpa District
- Tansen
- Bahadur Bhawan
- Rana palaces of Nepal
- B. P. Koirala
- 1950–1951 Nepalese revolution
