= List of ambassadors of Nepal to the United Kingdom =

Coordinates: 51.507510°N 0.190757°W

Ambassador of Nepal to the United Kingdom
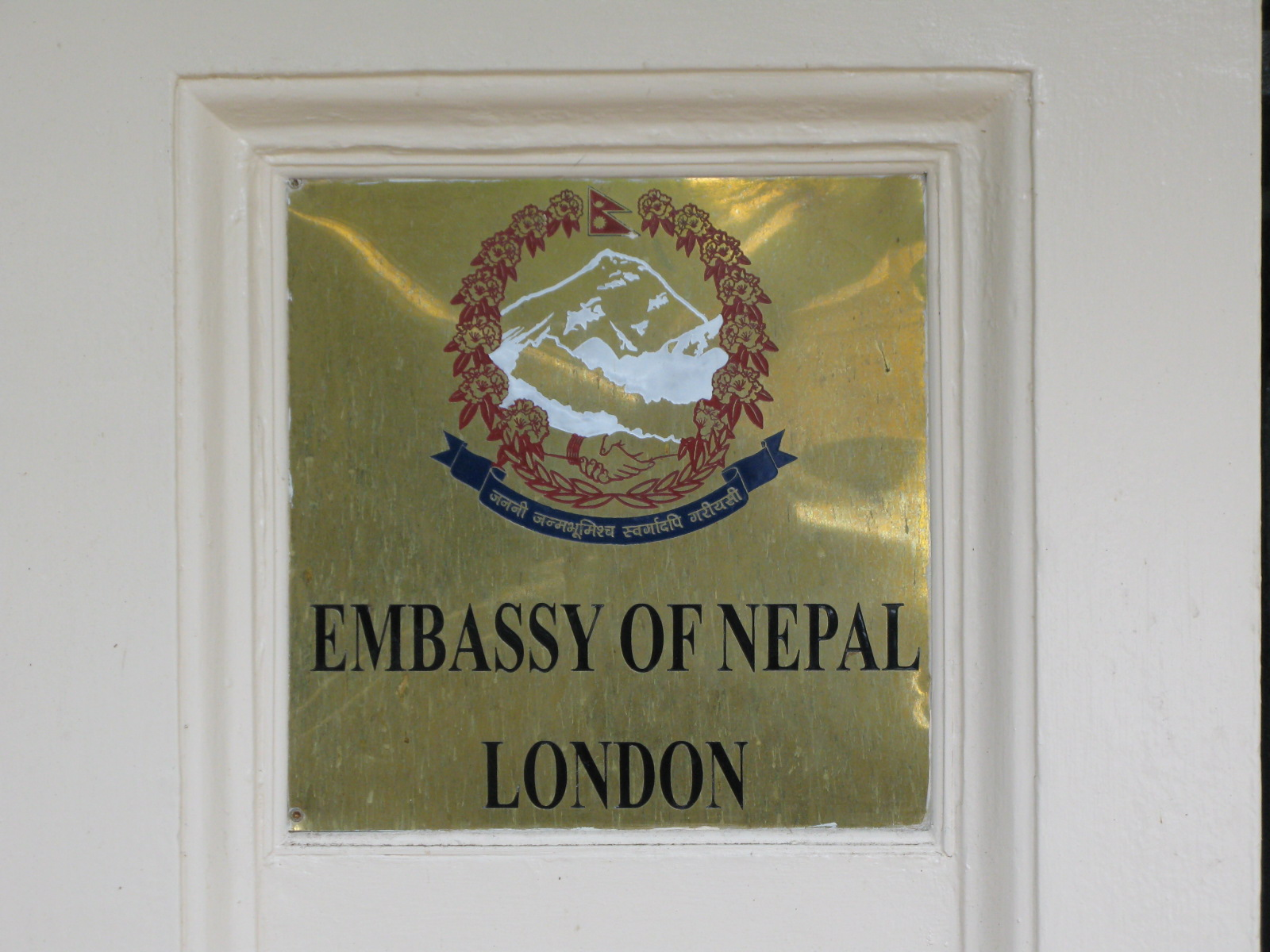
- Incumbent; Chandra Kumar Ghimire since January 17, 2025
- Inaugural holder: Bahadur Shumsher Jang Bahadur Rana
- Formation: April 1934

The Nepalese ambassador to the Court of St James's in London is the official representative of the Government in Kathmandu to the Government of the United Kingdom. He is concurrently accredited to Dublin, Valletta and the International Maritime Organization. His office is in the Embassy of Nepal, London.

== List of representatives ==
Diplomatic accreditation	Ambassador	Observations	Prime minister of Nepal	Prime minister of the United Kingdom	Term end
April 1934	Bahadur Shumsher Jang Bahadur Rana	Envoy	Juddha Shamsher Jang Bahadur Rana	Ramsay MacDonald	1936
1936	Krishna Shumsher Jung Bahadur Rana		Juddha Shamsher Jang Bahadur Rana	Stanley Baldwin	1939
1939	Singha Shumsher Jung Bahadur Rana	General Envoy Nepali Minister to London General Singha Shumshere JB Rana	Juddha Shamsher Jang Bahadur Rana	Neville Chamberlain	1947
1947	Kaiser Shumsher Jung Bahadur Rana	General Ambassador	Padma Shamsher Jang Bahadur Rana	Clement Attlee	1949
1949	Shanker Shumsher Jung Bahadur Rana	General	Mohan Shamsher Jang Bahadur Rana	Clement Attlee	1954
1954	Daman Shumsher Jung Bahadur Rana		Matrika Prasad Koirala	Winston Churchill	1957
1957	Ram Prasad Manandhar	Professor	Kunwar Inderjit Singh	Harold Macmillan	1961
1961	Kali Prasad Upadhaya		Tulsi Giri	Harold Macmillan	1965
1966	Ishwari Raj Mishra		Surya Bahadur Thapa	Harold Wilson	1969
1969	Upendra Bahadur Basnyat	Colonel	Kirti Nidhi Bista	Harold Wilson	1974
1974	Kiran Shamsher Rana	General	Nagendra Prasad Rijal	Edward Heath	1978
1979	Jharendra Narayan Singha		Surya Bahadur Thapa	Margaret Thatcher	1983
1983	Ishwari Raj Pandey		Lokendra Bahadur Chand	Margaret Thatcher	1988
1988	Bharat Kesher Simha	General	Nagendra Prasad Rijal	Margaret Thatcher	1992
1992	Surya Prasad Shrestha		Girija Prasad Koirala	John Major	1997
1997	Singha Bahadur Basnyat		Lokendra Bahadur Chand	Tony Blair	2003
2003	Prabal S.J.B. Rana		Surya Bahadur Thapa	Tony Blair	2006
2007	Murari Raj Sharma		Girija Prasad Koirala	Gordon Brown	2009
2010	Suresh Chandra Chalise		Madhav Kumar Nepal	David Cameron	2014
August 31, 2017	Durga Bahadur Subedi		Sher Bahadur Deuba	Theresa May	2020
October 1, 2020	Lok Darshan Regmi		KP Sharma Oli	Boris Johnson	2021
January 28, 2021	Gyan Chandra Acharya		KP Sharma Oli	Boris Johnson	2025
January 17, 2025	Chandra Kumar Ghimire		KP Sharma Oli	Keir Starmer	incumbent

== See also ==
- Nepal–United Kingdom relations
