= Bahadur Shumsher Jung Bahadur Rana =

Nepalese diplomat

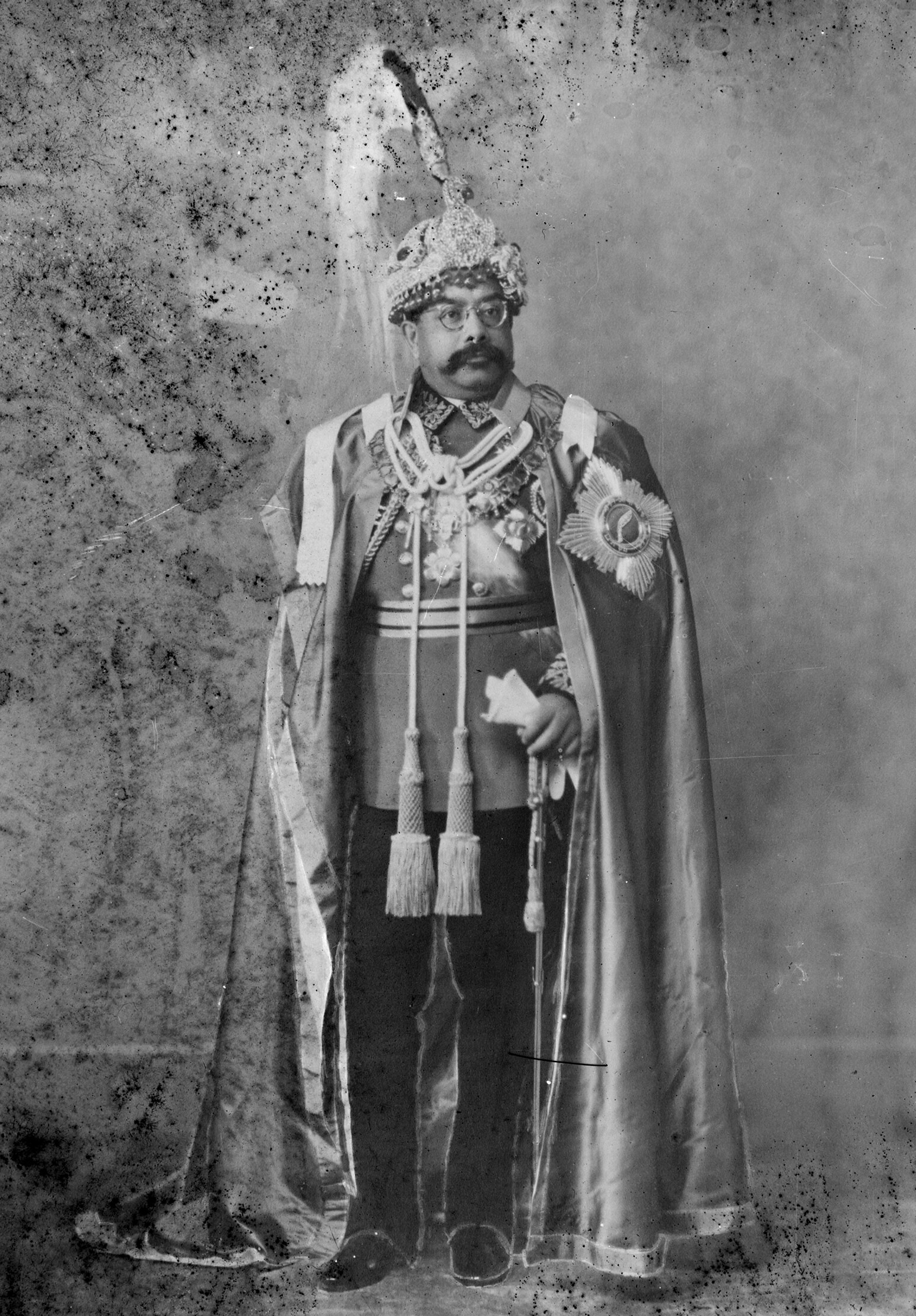

Nepalese Ambassador to the United Kingdom
- In office 1934–1936
- Monarch: King Tribhuvan
- Prime Minister: Juddha Shumsher Jung Bahadur Rana
- Preceded by: Position established
- Succeeded by: Krishna Shumsher Jung Bahadur Rana

Personal details
- Born: 1892 Kathmandu, Kingdom of Nepal
- Died: 19 May 1977 (aged 84–85) Bahadur Bhawan, Katmandu
- Children: Nara Shumsher Jang Bahadur Rana
- Parents: Juddha Shumsher Jung Bahadur Rana (father); Padma Kumari (mother)

Lieutenant-General Sir Bahadur Shumsher Jung Bahadur Rana (Nepali: बहादुर शमशेर जङ्गबहादुर राणा) C.B.E GCSI was a Nepalese diplomat. He was the first Nepalese Ambassador to the United Kingdom.

He was born in 1892 to Juddha Shumsher Jung Bahadur Rana and Padma Kumari. In 1934, Rana was appointed as the first Nepalese Ambassador to the United Kingdom by his father. In 1936, He was succeeded by Krishna Shumsher Jung Bahadur Rana. He died in 1977 in Bahadur Bhawan, Kathmandu. His son Nara Shumsher Jang Bahadur Rana served as the second police chief of Nepal Police.

He was gifted the Charburja Durbar which he later sold to Prince Basundhara of Nepal.

== Honours ==
- (United Kingdom) Order of the British Empire
- (British Raj) Knight Grand Commander of the Order of the Star of India
- (United Kingdom) British War Medal
- (France) Legion of Honour
- (United Kingdom) Order of the Bath
- Order of the Crown of Italy
- Order of the Star of Nepal
- (Nepal) Order of Gorkha Dakshina Bahu
