= Kanti Rajya Lakshmi Devi Shah =

Kanti Rajya Lakshmi Devi Shah कान्ति राज्लक्ष्मी देवी शाह

Queen consort of Nepal
- Tenure: March 1919 – 13 March 1955
- Born: 5 July 1906; Sitapur, Kheri, British India
- Died: 12 April 1973 (aged 66); Narayanhity Royal Palace, Kathmandu, Kingdom of Nepal
- Spouse: Tribhuvan of Nepal (m. 1919; died 1955)
- Issue: King Mahendra; Prince Himalaya; Princess Trilokya; Princess Vijaya; Princess Bharati
Names
- Kanti Rajya Lakshmi Devi Shah
- House: Shah dynasty (by marriage)
- Father: Arjan Singh Sahib
- Mother: Krishnavati Devi Sahiba
- Religion: Hinduism

Kanti Rajya Lakshmi Devi Shah (Nepali: कान्ति राज्यलक्ष्मीदेवी शाह; 5 July 1906 – 12 April 1973) was the queen consort and first wife of Tribhuvan Bir Bikram Shah, King of Nepal. She was the mother of King Mahendra Bir Bikram Shah.

== Life ==
She was the daughter of Arjan Singh Sahib, Raja of Chhatara, Barhgaon and Oudh and his wife, Krishnavati Devi Sahiba of the British colony.

She was married (at a young age in an arranged custom) at the Narayanhity Royal Palace, Kathmandu, in March 1919, to King Tribhuvan of Nepal as his first wife [senior wife], in a double ceremony with her younger sister Ishwari, as the king's second wife [junior wife]. Both Kanti and Tribhuvan were just 13 years old when she bore their first child, Mahendra, on 11 June 1920.

In 1948, Erica Leuchtag, a German physiotherapist, who had been serving the royal family of Patiala was invited to treat Queen Kanti. Leuchtag also treated the King and reportedly befriended many members of the Nepali royal family including the junior Queen Ishwari and the princesses Nalini, Vijaya and Bharati inside the Narayanhiti Palace during her time in Nepal when the royal family was not allowed to leave the palace by the Rana rulers. This account has been detailed in Leuchtag's book Erica and the King.

During the reign of King Mahendra, the Queen Mothers Kanti and Ishwari wished to establish a university in Nepal to meet the needs of the nation as the existing colleges were affiliated with Patna University of India and thus adhered to its prescribed courses, policies and rules. As such, the University Commission was established on March 31, 1956, with the senior Queen Mother Kanti serving as the chairperson and the junior Queen Mother Ishwari serving as the Vice Chairperson. The two Queen Mothers laid the foundation stone on June 25, 1958, and personally donated 375 ropanis of land in Lalitpur designated for their widowhood by their late husband King Tribhuvan. As a result, Tribhuvan University was established on June 25, 1959.

== Issue ==
She and King Tribhuvan had five children:

- King Mahendra of Nepal (1920–1972), married firstly Lady Indra Rajya Lakshmi Devi Shah and secondly Lady Ratna Rajya Lakshmi Devi Shah. He had children by his first wife;
- Prince Himalaya of Nepal (1921–1980), married Lady Princep Rajya Lakshmi Devi Shah. He had no children;
- Princess Trilokya of Nepal (1922–1990), married Rajkumar Sri Hardyal Singh, Prince of Sikar. She had an adopted son;
- Princess Vijaya of Nepal (1925–1992), unmarried;
- Princess Bharati of Nepal (1927–2020), married Maharaja Sri Pradeep Chandra Bhanj Deo, the Maharaja of Mayurbhanj. She had children.

== Honours ==
- Member of the Order of the Benevolent Ruler (1954).
- King Mahendra Coronation Medal (2 May 1956).

== See also ==
- Kanti Children's Hospital.

Royal titles
Preceded by Divyeshwari	Queen consort of Nepal; 1919–1955	Succeeded by Ratna
