= Murari =

Murari (Sanskrit: मुरारि, romanized: Murāri, lit. 'Slayer of Mura') is an epithet of the Hindu deity Krishna, referring to his act of slaying the asura, Mura.

Murari may also refer to:

== People ==
- Murari (author) (approx. 9th century AD), Sanskrit dramatic poet and author of Anargharāghava
- K. Murari (1944-2022), Indian film producer
- Sarvesh Murari, Indian cinematographer
- Krishna Murari Moghe (born 1947), Indian politician
- Murari Lal Sharma Neeras (born 1936), Indian author
- Murari Raj Sharma (1951–2020), Nepalese ambassador to the United Nations

== Other ==
- Murari (2001 film), a Telugu film directed by Krishna Vamshi
- Murari (2015 film), an Indian Kannada-language action drama film

== See also ==
- Murarai, a town in West Bengal, India
