= Nepal Bidya Bhusan Padak =

Nepalese academic award

- Awarded for: Top-performing students on the occasion of National Education Day and International Literacy Day.
- Location: Shital Niwas
- Country: Nepal
- Presented by: President of Nepal
- First award: 8 September 2005
- Ribbon of the medal

Nepal Bidya Bhusan Padak (Bidya Medal of Knowledge of Nepal) is an award conferred by the President of Nepal to selected new recipients of a PhD based on a thesis screening and interview every year during a special function organized at the presidential palace Shital Niwas on the occasion of National Education Day of Nepal and international literacy day.

Government of Nepal through Ministry of Education announces application every year for the three categories of this award A, B and C ( Nepali : क, ख,ग). This award consists of a certificate and a medal.

Nepal Bidya Bhusan Padak ‘A’ is the most prestigious literary award presented from the government.
