= Krishna Shumsher Jung Bahadur Rana =

Nepalese diplomat

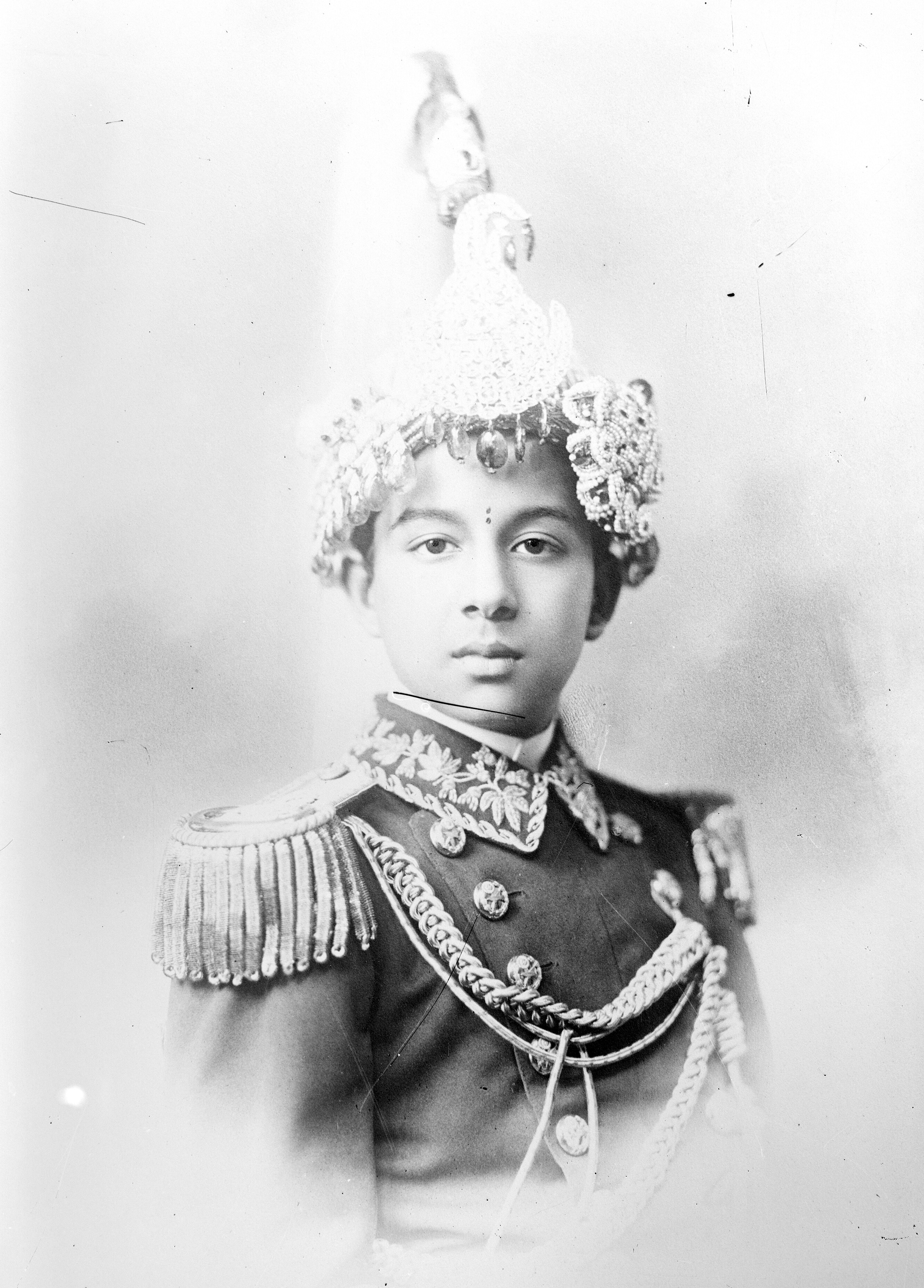
Krishna Shumsher Jung Bahadur Rana (1900–1977)

Lieutenant-General Sir Krishna Shumsher Jung Bahadur Rana (Nepali: कृष्ण शमशेर जङ्गबहादुर राणा; 1900–1977) was a Nepalese diplomat who served as the Nepalese Ambassador to the United Kingdom from 1935 to 1939.

He was born on 8 February 1900 in Singha Durbar, Kathmandu, Nepal to Prime Minister Chandra Shumsher Jung Bahadur Rana and Bada Maharani Chandra Loka Bhakta as an "A class" son. He received private education from Indian teachers from Bengal and Calcutta. In 1909, Rana married Princess Tara Rajya Lakshmi Devi, daughter of King Prithvi Bir Bikram Shah. They had two daughters and a son. In 1923, Chandra Shumsher built the Sital Niwas (now occupied by the President of Nepal) for Krishna and his wife.

In 1935, Krishna Shumsher was made the Nepalese Ambassador to the United Kingdom until he was replaced by his elder brother General Singha Shumsher in 1939. He was described to be the "most successful and popular Minister in London". In 1943, he was promoted to be General Officer, Commander-in-Chief of the Nepalese contingent in India until 1945. In 1947, he visited Kuomintang-led China for a diplomatic mission.

Krishna Shumsher was also put in charge to construct Sundarijal Hydropower Station, the second hydro-electric project in Nepal. He was often praised for his progressive views. Krishna Shumsher held liberal views and was a strong supporter of Padma Shumsher Jung Bahadur Rana’s progressive policies, however, other Rana members like Mohan Shumsher, Babar Shumsher and Bahadur Shumsher feared that it could threaten autocratic Rana dynasty's powers. After Prime Minister Padma Shumsher was replaced by Mohan Shumsher, in 1948, he left Nepal to live in Bangalore, he gave up his position of hazuria general ("most trusted") and left his properties including the Sital Niwas for which he left behind about 300,000 Nepalese rupees (NPR) for maintenance. He died in 1977 in India.

He was awarded the Nepal Pratap Bhaskara, Star of Nepal, Order of Leopold II (Belgium), Order of Cloud and Banner (China), Burma Star, War Medal, Order of the British Empire, and Order of the Star of India (KCSI).
