= Murari Raj Sharma =

Nepalese diplomat (1951–2020)

Nepalese foreign secretary
- In office November 1997 – 1999

Nepalese Permanent Representative next the Headquarters of the United Nations
- In office July 20, 2000 – 2002
- Preceded by: 1956-1960: Rishikesh Shah
- Succeeded by: Durga Prasad Bhattarai

Nepalese Ambassador to the Court of St James's
- In office February 12, 2008 – 2010
- Preceded by: Prabal S.J.B. Rana
- Succeeded by: Suresh Chandra Chalise

Personal details
- Born: 1 April 1951
- Died: 15 January 2020 (aged 68) London, United Kingdom

Murari Raj Sharma (1951–2020) was a former ambassador for Nepal to the United Kingdom. He presented his letters of credence to the British Queen on February 12, 2008 at Buckingham Palace. Prior to this, he was a Member of the United Nations Advisory Committee on Administrative and Budgetary Questions. An award winning author, he wrote Reinventing the United Nations and Murari Adhikari's Short Stories. Sharma chaired a number of UN Committees. Sharma was involved in resolving issues caused by the hijacking of the Indian Airlines Flight 814.
