= Nepal Red Cross Society =

Humanitarian organization in Nepal

- Logo of Nepal Red Cross Society
- Abbreviation: NRCS
- Formation: 4 September 1963; 63 years ago
- Founder: Princess Princep Shah of Nepal
- Type: Aid agency
- Legal status: Non-Profit Organization and Auxiliary to Government in the humanitarian field
- Purpose: Humanitarian aid
- Headquarters: Kathmandu, Nepal
- Region served: Nepal
- Members: 1,026,422 Total members (2018/19)
- Chairperson: Dr. Bishal Kumar Bhandari
- Secretary General: Mr. Rishi Raman Khanal
- Treasurer General: Mr. Kabindra Karki
- Officiating Executive Director: Ms. Mona Aryal
- Main organ: Central Executive Committee
- Affiliations: International Red Cross and Red Crescent Movement
- Budget: 5,140,000,000
- Staff: 343 (Headquarters Only) (2024)
- Volunteers: 89,863 Volunteers (2024)
- Website: Official website

Nepal Red Cross Society (NRCS; Nepali: नेपाल रेडक्रस सोसाइटी, romanized: nēpāla rēḍakrasa sōsā'iṭī) is an independent, volunteer-based and humanitarian organization that delivers humanitarian service and support to the vulnerable people in an impartial and neutral manner. It was formed on 4 September 1963. Having been recognized by the International Committee of the Red Cross (ICRC) and affiliated to International Federation of Red Cross and Red Crescent Societies (IFRC) on 1 October 1964.

NRCS has, over the years, grown to be the largest humanitarian organization in Nepal, with its network of District Chapters (DCs) extended in each of the 77 districts of the country. District Chapters receive organizational support from more than 1,508 Sub-Chapters, 5,410 Junior and 865 Youth Red Cross Circles and Co-operation Committees under them. In addition, NRCS has been providing its services from two eye hospitals, extended eye care centres, 117 blood transfusion centers, 272 ambulance service stations and 12 warehouses within the country.

The Red Cross symbol

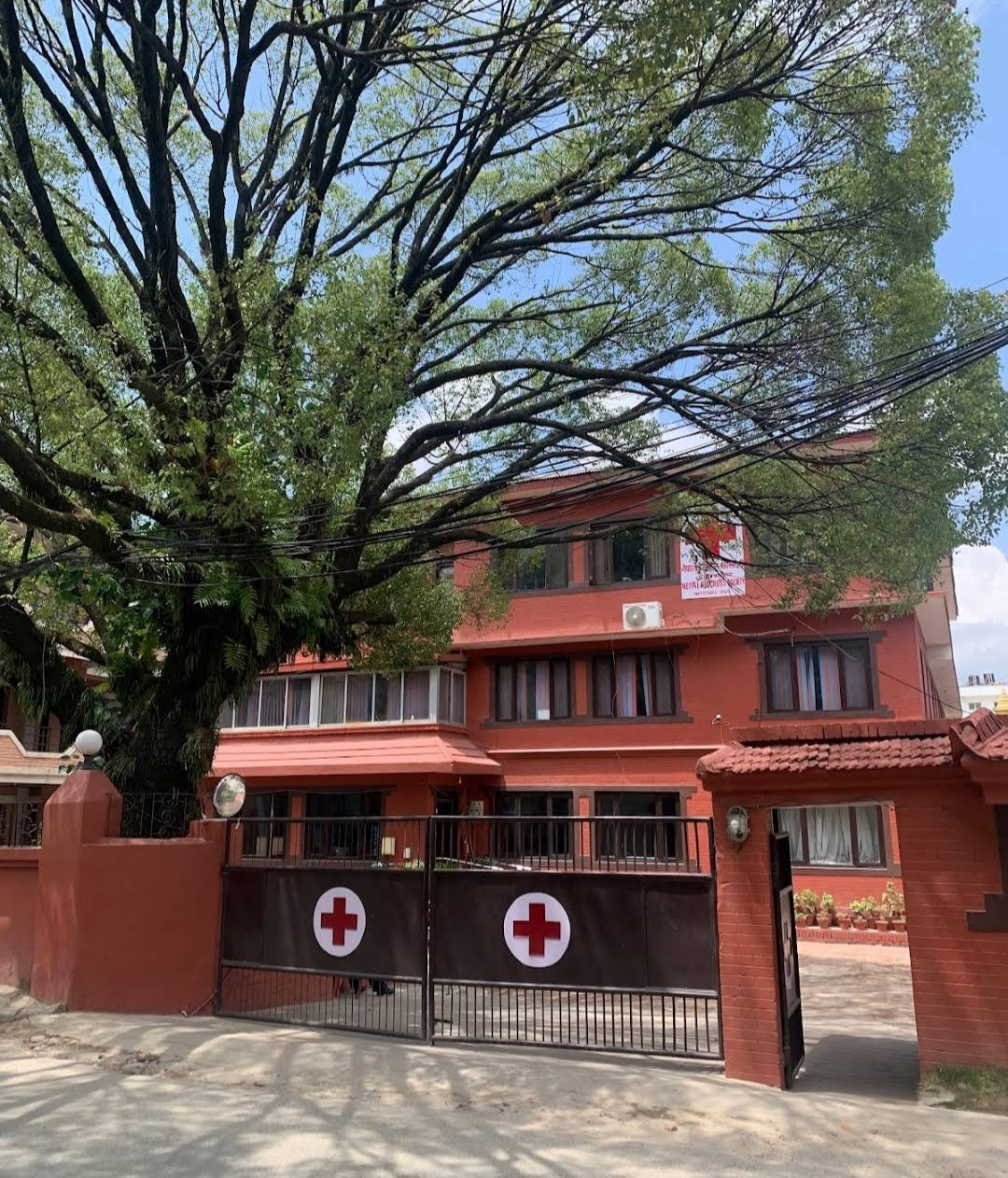
Nepal Red Cross Society Entrance of NRCS Headquarters

== History ==
Health Minister Dr. Nageshwar Prasad Singh proposed the inception of the Nepal Red Cross Society during a meeting at Singha Durbar. The Nepal Red Cross Society was formed on 4 September 1963. Princess Princep Shah of Nepal helped found the Nepal Red Cross and was its first President.

== Organizational structure ==
Nepal Red Cross Society (NRCS) has District Chapters (DC) in each district of the country. Which receives organizational support from Sub-Chapters, Youth/Junior Red Cross Circles and Co-operation Committees under them.

=== National Committees ===
- National Disaster & Crisis Management Committee
- National Health & Community Resilience Committee
- National Humanitarian Principles & Diplomacy Committee
- National Organization & Capacity Development Committee

Central Committees provide guidance to bringing effectiveness in programme having National Network.

=== Central Committees ===
- Central Junior/Youth RC Committee
- Central Health Service Committee
- Central Community Development Committee
- Central Finance Development Committee
- Central Gender & Inclusion Committee
- Central Blood Transfusion Management Committee

There are five regional committees and other committees related to management and technical areas. District chapter and sub-chapter have separate committees working in local level.

=== Provincial Coordination Committees ===
Nepal Red Cross Society has 7 Provincial Coordination Committees for each province of Nepal.

=== Provincial Level Assembly ===
The first provincial assembly elections in Nepal was held in two phases, on 26 November 2017 and on 7 December 2017. As the government changed its structure through the constitution of Nepal. Nepal Red Cross Society also needed to change its structure as per the government's setup. Thus, NRCS reformed its statute on 47th General Convention of the central assembly held at Biratnagar. As per the new statue NRCS has changed its structure into four levels – local, district, provincial and central levels.

=== District Level Committees ===
Nepal Red Cross Society has district chapters in all 77 districts of the country. These district chapters receive organizational support from Sub-Chapters at local level, Junior/ Youth Red Cross Circles in district level and coordinating committees under them.

=== Sub-Chapter Level Committees ===
Sub-Chapters are the local level committees reaching every ward of the district. The working area of sub-chapters are divided into various wards of the Village / Municipality / Metropolitan City. These sub-chapters receives organizational support from Junior/ Youth Red Cross Circles based on schools and coordinating committees at communities.

=== List of Chairperson of the Nepal Red Cross Society ===
No.	Chairperson	Start of term	End of term	Election Year
1	Princess Princep Shah of Nepal	1963	1983	1963 September 4 (Ad. Hoc Committee Formed): Chairperson : Her Royal Highness Princess Princep Shah; Health Minister : Dr. Nageshwor Prasad Singh; Governor and Secretariat : Dr. Jaya Narayan Giri; 1964 (First Central Election); 1968 (Second Central Election); 1971 (Third Central Election); 1974 (Fourth Central Election); 1977 (Fifth Central Election)
2	Princess Helen Shah of Nepal	1983	1990	1983 (Sixth Central Election); 1986 (Seventh Central Election); 1990 (Eighth Central Election)
3	Mr. Ramesh Kumar Sharma	1990	2007	1982 March 1 Acting Chairperson (Sixth Central Election): 1992 (Ninth Central Election); 1994 (Tenth Central Election); 1998 (Eleventh Central Election); 2003 (Twelve Central Election)
4	Mr. Sanjiv Thapa	2007	2019	2007 (Thirteenth Election); 2011 (Fourteenth Election); 2015 (Fifteenth Election) (3rd Term – 4 Years Tenure) Later Committee dissolved by District Administration Office
5	Prof. Dr. Bishwa Keshar Maskay	July 2019	September 2019	Appointed to Ad Hoc Central Executive Committee by District Administration Office
6	Mr. Sanjiv Thapa (Reinstated)	September 2019	July 2020	Supreme Court nullified the DAO decision of forming Ad Hoc Central Executive Committee
7	Dr. Netra Prasad Timsina	July 2020	December 2021	Appointed to Ad Hoc Central Executive Committee by GoN Council of Ministers
8	Prof. Sudarshan Prasad Nepal	December 2021	July 2023	Appointed to Ad Hoc Central Executive Committee by GoN Council of Ministers
9	Prof. Sudarshan Prasad Nepal	July 2023	July 2025	Central Election via Special General Assembly Controversy of two parallel Central Executive Committee
10	Mr. Binod Kumar Sharma	July 2025	May 2026	Appointed to Ad Hoc Central Executive Committee by Government of Nepal, the Ministry of Women, Children, and Senior Citizens later resigned citing governments interference in election procedure within NRCS
11	Dr. Bishal Kumar Bhandari	June 2026	Present	Appointed to Ad Hoc Central Executive Committee by GoN Council of Ministers recommended by Ministry of Women, Children, Gender and Sexual Minorities, and Social Security

== Administrative structure ==
Departments / Division / Units
S.N.	Department	Divisions / Units
1	Disaster and Crisis Management Department	1. Disaster Preparedness and Recovery Division; 2. Disaster Risk Reduction Division
2	Health Service Department	1. First Aid Division; 2. Health Care Division
3	Community Development Department	1. Water Sanitation and Hygiene Division; 2. Community Resilience Division
4	Blood Transfusion Service Department	1. Donor Motivation and Relationship Management Division; 2. Technical and Quality Management Division
5	Humanitarian Values and Communication Department	1. Humanitarian Diplomacy and Communication Division
6	Gender and Inclusion Department	-
7	Organizational Development Department	1. Organizational and Capacity Building Division; 2. Volunteer Management Division
8	General Service and Coordination Department	1. General Administration Division; 2. Support Service Division
9	Junior and Youth Red Cross Department	1. Junior and Youth Organization Development Division; 2. Junior and Youth Programme Division
10	Human Resource Management Department	1. Human Resource Development Division; 2. Human Resource Development Institute (HRDI - National Training Center)
11	Finance and Resource Management Department	1. Accounts and Financial Risk Management Division; 2. Property and Resource Management Division
-	-	Internal Audit Division
-	-	PMER - IM Division
-	-	Legal Unit
-	-	Procurement Unit

== Structure ==
Organizational Network of Nepal Red Cross Society
S.N.	Organizational Units	Number
1	National Headquarters	1 (Kathmandu)
2	Province Chapter Office	7 Province
3	District Chapter Office	77 District
4	Sub-Chapters	15,56 Sub-Chapter
5	Support Committees	164 Supporting Committees
6	Junior Red Cross Circles	3,849 Schools
7	Youth Red Cross Circles	University / College / Campus / Community Based; 2414 / 177; Total Youth Red Cross Circles: 2,591
Total Units of Nepal Red Cross Society (As of Last-July 2022)		8,245

=== Koshi Province ===
Districts of Koshi Province
S.N.	Name	District Chapter	Nepali
1	Bhojpur District	Bhojpur District Chapter	भोजपुर जिल्ला शाखा
2	Dhankuta District	Dhankuta District Chapter	धनकुटा जिल्ला शाखा
3	Ilam District	Ilam District Chapter	इलाम जिल्ला शाखा
4	Jhapa District	Jhapa District Chapter	झापा जिल्ला शाखा
5	Khotang District	Khotang District Chapter	खोटाँग जिल्ला शाखा
6	Morang District	Morang District Chapter	मोरंग जिल्ला शाखा
7	Okhaldhunga District	Okhaldhunga District Chapter	ओखलढुंगा जिल्ला शाखा
8	Panchthar District	Panchthar District Chapter	पांचथर जिल्ला शाखा
9	Sankhuwasabha District	Sanhuwasabha District Chapter	संखुवासभा जिल्ला शाखा
10	Solukhumbu District	Solukhumbu District Chapter	सोलुखुम्बू जिल्ला शाखा
11	Sunsari District	Sunsari District Chapter	सुनसरी जिल्ला शाखा
12	Taplejung District	Taplejung District Chapter	ताप्लेजुंग जिल्ला शाखा
13	Terhathum District	Terhathum District Chapter	तेह्रथुम जिल्ला शाखा
14	Udayapur District	Udayapur District Chapter	उदयपुर जिल्ला शाखा

=== Madhesh Province ===
Districts of Madhesh
S.N.	Districts	District Chapter	Nepali
1	Saptari District	Saptari District Chapter	सप्तरी जिल्ला शाखा
2	Siraha District	Siraha District Chapter	सिराहा जिल्ला शाखा
3	Dhanusa District	Dhanusha District Chapter	धनुषा जिल्ला शाखा
4	Mahottari District	Mahottari District Chapter	महोत्तरी जिल्ला शाखा
5	Sarlahi District	Sarlahi District Chapter	सर्लाही जिल्ला शाखा
6	Bara District	Bara District Chapter	बारा जिल्ला शाखा
7	Parsa District	Parsa District Chapter	पर्सा जिल्ला शाखा
8	Rautahat District	Rautahat District Chapter	रौतहट जिल्ला शाखा

=== Bagmati (Province No. 3) ===
Districts of Province No. 3
sr.	Districts	District Chapter	Nepali
1	Sindhuli District	Sindhuli District Chapter	सिन्धुली जिल्ला शाखा
2	Ramechhap District	Ranechhap District Chapter	रामेछाप जिल्ला शाखा
3	Dolakha District	Dolakha District Chapter	दोलखा जिल्ला शाखा
4	Bhaktapur District	Bhaktapur District Chapter	भक्तपुर जिल्ला शाखा
5	Dhading District	Dhading District Chapter	धादिङ जिल्ला शाखा
6	Kathmandu District	Kathmandu District Chapter	काठमाडौँ जिल्ला शाखा
7	Kavrepalanchok District	Kavrepalanchowk District Chapter	काभ्रेपलान्चोक जिल्ला शाखा
8	Lalitpur District	Lalitpur District Chapter	ललितपुर जिल्ला शाखा
9	Nuwakot District	Nuwakot District Chapter	नुवाकोट जिल्ला शाखा
10	Rasuwa District	Rasuwa District Chapter	रसुवा जिल्ला शाखा
11	Sindhupalchok District	Sindhupalchowk District Chapter	सिन्धुपाल्चोक जिल्ला शाखा
12	Chitwan District	Chitwan District Chapter	चितवन जिल्ला शाखा
13	Makwanpur District	Makwanpur District Chapter	मकवानपुर जिल्ला शाखा

=== Gandaki Pradesh (Province No. 4) ===
Districts of Province No. 4
sr.	Districts	District Chapter	Nepali
1	Baglung District	Baglung District Chapter	बागलुङ जिल्ला शाखा
2	Gorkha District	Gorkha District Chapter	गोरखा जिल्ला शाखा
3	Kaski District	Kaski District Chapter	कास्की जिल्ला शाखा
4	Lamjung District	Lamjug District Chapter	लमजुङ जिल्ला शाखा
5	Manang District	Manang District Chapter	मनाङ जिल्ला शाखा
6	Mustang District	Mustang District Chapter	मुस्ताङ जिल्ला शाखा
7	Myagdi District	Myagdi District Chapter	म्याग्दी जिल्ला शाखा
8	Nawalpur District	Nawalparasi District Chapter	नवलपुर जिल्ला शाखा
9	Parbat District	Parbat District Chapter	पर्वत जिल्ला
10	Syangja District	Syangja District Chapter	स्याङग्जा जिल्ला शाखा
11	Tanahun District	Tanahun District Chapter	तनहुँ जिल्ला शाखा

=== Lumbini Province ===
Districts of Lumbini
sr.	Districts	District Chapter	Nepali
1	Kapilvastu District	Kapilvastu District Chapter	कपिलवस्तु जिल्ला शाखा
2	Parasi District	Parasi District Chapter	परासी जिल्ला शाखा
3	Rupandehi District	Rupandehi District Chapter	रुपन्देही जिल्ला शाखा
4	Arghakhanchi District	Arghakhanchi District Chapter	अर्घाखाँची जिल्ला शाखा
5	Gulmi District	Gulmi District Chapter	गुल्मी जिल्ला शाखा
6	Palpa District	Palpa District Chapter	पाल्पा जिल्ला शाखा
7	Dang District	Dang District Chapter	दाङ जिल्ला शाखा
8	Pyuthan District	Pyuthan District Chapter	प्युठान जिल्ला शाखा
9	Rolpa District	Rolpa District Chapter	रोल्पा जिल्ला शाखा
10	Eastern Rukum District	Purba Rukum District Chapter	पूर्वी रूकुम जिल्ला शाखा
11	Banke District	Banke District Chapter	बाँके जिल्ला शाखा
12	Bardiya District	Bardia District Chapter	बर्दिया जिल्ला शाखा

=== Karnali Pradesh (Province No. 6) ===
Districts of Province No. 6
sr.	Districts	District Chapter	Nepali
1	Western Rukum District	Rukum District Chapter	पश्चिमी रूकुम जिल्ला शाखा
2	Salyan District	Salyan District Chapter	सल्यान जिल्ला शाखा
3	Dolpa District	Dolpa District Chapter	डोल्पा जिल्ला शाखा
4	Humla District	Humla District Chapter	हुम्ला जिल्ला शाखा
5	Jumla District	Jumla District Chapter	जुम्ला जिल्ला शाखा
6	Kalikot District	Kalikot District Chapter	कालिकोट जिल्ला शाखा
7	Mugu District	Mugu District Chapter	मुगु जिल्ला शाखा
8	Surkhet District	Surkhet District Chapter	सुर्खेत जिल्ला शाखा
9	Dailekh District	Dailekh District Chapter	दैलेख जिल्ला शाखा
10	Jajarkot District	Jajarkot District Chapter	जाजरकोट जिल्ला शाखा

=== Sudurpashchim Pradesh (Province No. 7) ===
Districts of Province No. 7
sr.	Districts	District Chapter	Nepali
1	Kailali District	Kailali District Chapter	कैलाली जिल्ला शाखा
2	Achham District	Achham District Chapter	अछाम जिल्ला शाखा
3	Doti District	Doti District Chapter	डोटी जिल्ला शाखा
4	Bajhang District	Bajhang District Chapter	बझाङ जिल्ला शाखा
5	Bajura District	Bajura District Chapter	बाजुरा जिल्ला शाखा
6	Kanchanpur District	Kanchanpur District Chapter	कंचनपुर जिल्ला शाखा
7	Dadeldhura District	Dadheldhura District Chapter	डडेलधुरा जिल्ला शाखा
8	Baitadi District	Baitadi District Chapter	बैतडी जिल्ला शाखा
9	Darchula District	Darchula District Chapter	दार्चुला जिल्ला शाखा

== Blood Service ==
Blood Transfusion Service of Nepal Red Cross Society was established in the year 1966, three years after the inception of the Society itself. The government of Nepal, in its policy declaration of 1991, has mandated Nepal Red Cross Society as the sole authority in conducting blood programmes in Nepal.

=== Central level ===
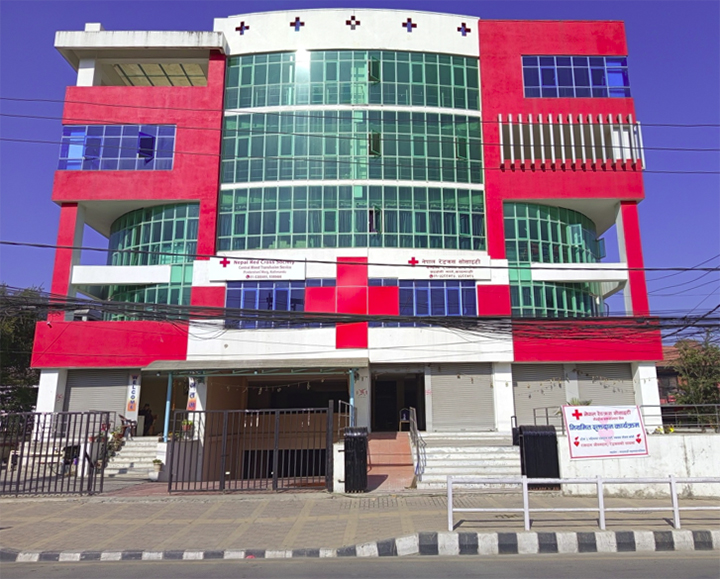
Building of Central Blood Transfusion Service Center located at Pradarsani Marg (Exhibition Road) Kathmandu, Nepal

The Central Blood Transfusion Service Center (CBTSC) in Kathmandu is responsible for management of services in the Kathmandu valley, and for supervising and monitoring the technical standards of the district centers, providing guidance to ensure the collection and supply of safe blood.

=== Provincial level ===
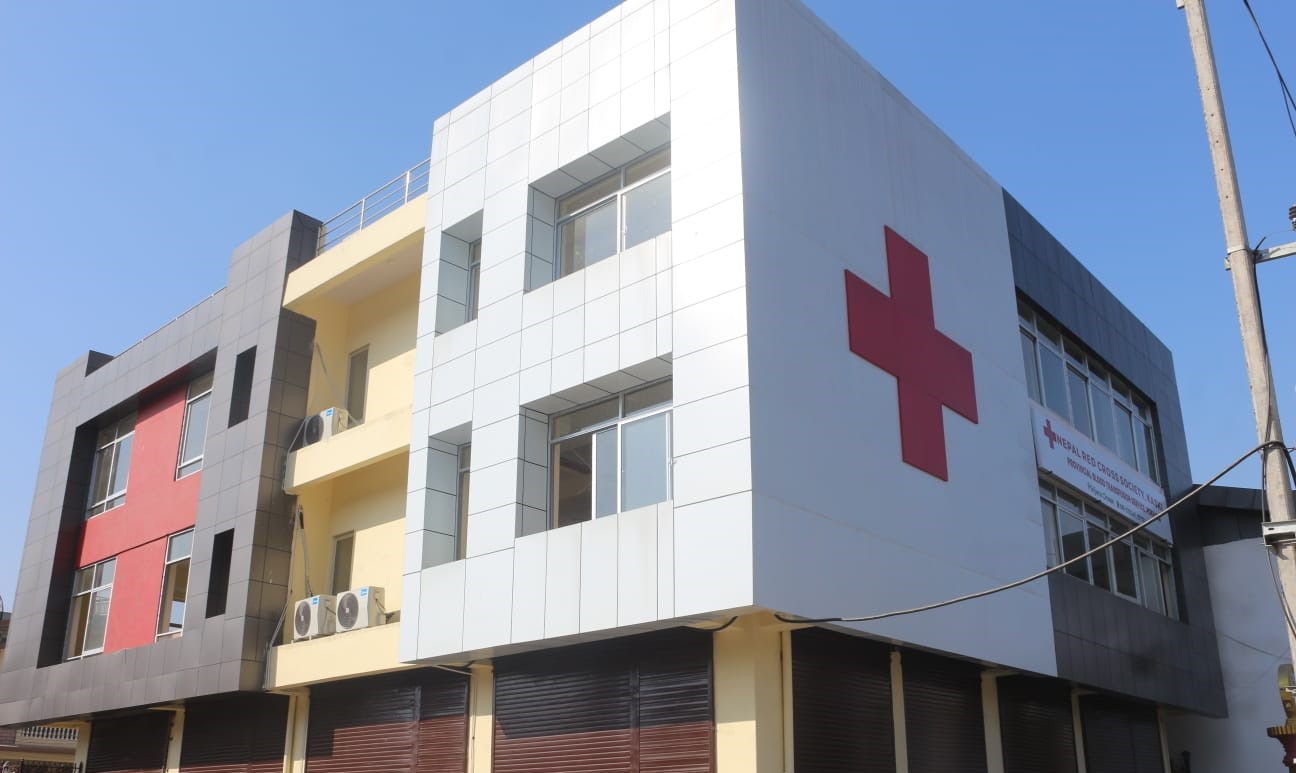
Nepal Red Cross Society Kaski District Chapter Provincial Blood Transfusion Service

Five provinces have blood transfusion service centers at Biratnagar, Chitwan, Pokhra, Nepalganj and Dhangadhi. Those provide local services, and thus there is no distinct functioning management structure at the province level.

=== District level ===
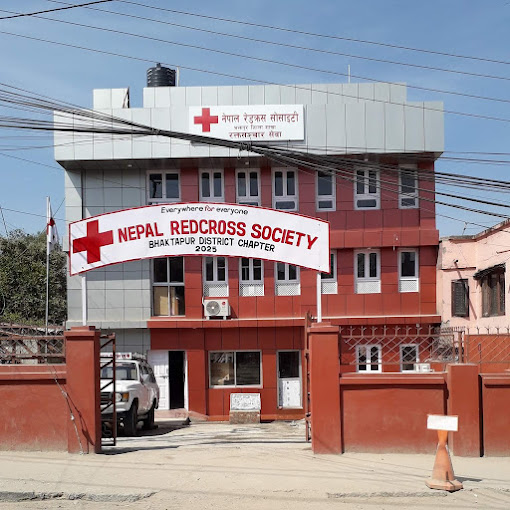
Nepal Red Cross Society Bhaktapur District Chapter office and Bhaktapur Blood Transfusion Service Building

The district BTSCs are managed by NRCS district chapters. These centres are supposed to comply with guidelines provided under the 1983 NRCS regulations and the 1998 Standard Operating Procedures.

=== Emergency Blood Transfusion center ===
BTSCs that provides emergency transfusion are classified under it. Emergency BTSCs have no storage facilities, but keep a list of donors who can be called upon to donate blood in an emergency. They provide basic cross-matching and testing services.

=== Hospital Unit ===
BTSCs established by Governmental or Private Hospitals/ Institutions are classified under this unit.

=== Structure of Blood Transfusion Service ===
Types/Levels of BTCs	Number	Coverage
Central BTSC	1	Kathmandu
Regional BTSCs	5	Biratnagar, Chitwan, Pokhara, Nepalgunj, Dhangadhi
District BTSCs	22	22 Districts
Emergency BTCs	42	42 Districts
Hospital units	36	Bir Hospital, Paropakar Maternity Hospital, Teaching Hospital, Patan Hospital, Shree Manmohan Hospital, Nepal Police Hospital, Nepal Army Hospital, Nobel Hospital, Grande Hospital... etc (All Hospital based blood banks)

== Ambulance service ==
Nepal Red Cross Society has been providing ambulance service all over Nepal through 68 District Chapters, Sub-Chapters and Supporting Committees. Currently, 272 ambulance are providing service through 196 points all over the country. Annually, estimated 68,400 patients are benefitted from the ambulance service.

== Eye Hospital ==
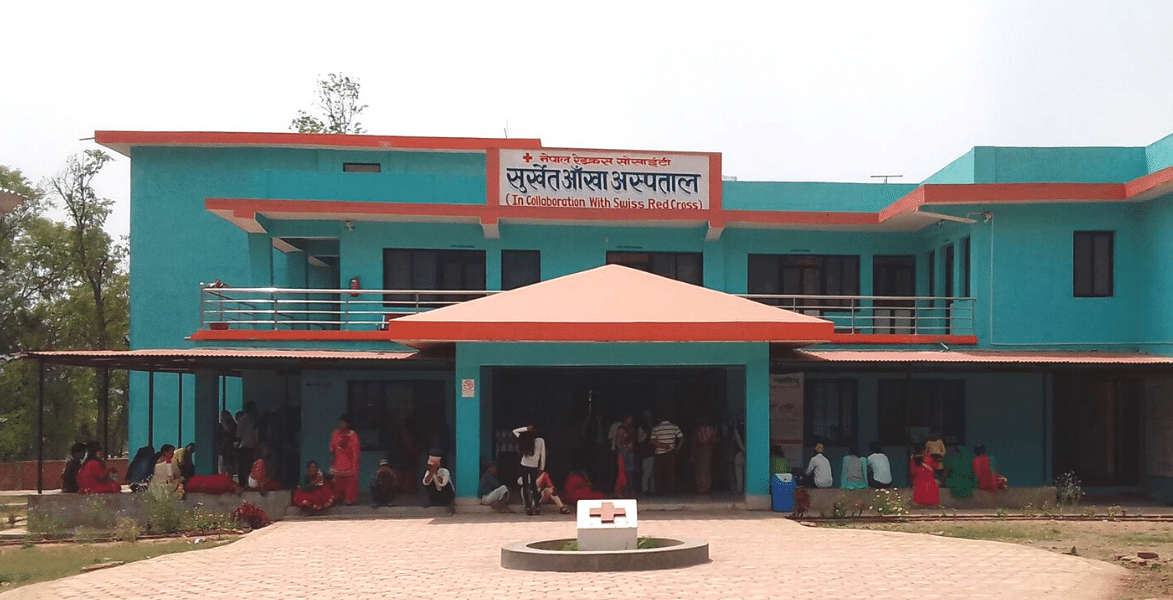
The Nepal Red Cross Society Surkhet Eye Hospital Building of NRCS SEH.

Nepal Red Cross Society has been managing eye care services as a key component of health service in Mid-West Region (Karnali Province) since 1990s through eye care centers (Surkhet, Dailekh, Jajarkot and Bardia) and outreach program with the support of Swiss Red Cross. NRCS operates two eye hospitals and extended eye care centers within the country.

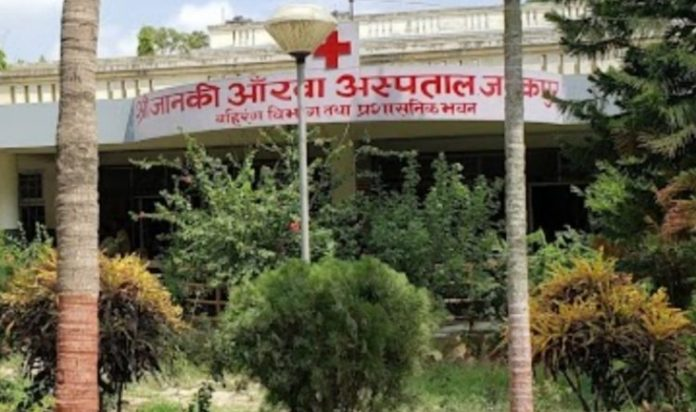
Shree Janaki Eye Hospital, Nepal Red Cross Society

S.N	Name of Hospital	District
1	Nepal Red Cross Surkhet Eye Hospital	Surkhet
2	Nepal Red Cross Janaki Eye Hospital	Dhanusha

== Snake Bite Treatment Center ==
Nepal Red Cross Society has snake bite treatment center in Damak Municipality of Jhapa district operated through NRCS Damak Sub-Chapter which provides 24 hr service. In 2020, the Damak center alone treated 887 snakebite cases.

== Training Center ==
The Nepal Red Cross Society has its National Training Center, Human Resource Development Institute (HRDI) at Budol, Banepa, Kavre, Nepal.
