= Boris Lisanevich =

Russian businessman (1905 –1985)

Boris Lissanevitch
- Борис Миколайович Лисаневич
- Born: Boris Nikolayevich Lisanevich; 4 October 1905; Odessa, Ukraine
- Died: 20 October 1985 (aged 80); Kathmandu, Nepal
- Occupation(s): Hotelier, restaurateur
- Known for: Opening first hotel in Nepal

Boris Nikolayevich Lisanevich (Ukrainian: Борис Миколайович Лисаневич, Russian: Борис Николаевич Лисаневич; 1905 –1985) was a ballet dancer, a hotelier and a restaurateur. He helped pave the way for tourism in Nepal, when he opened the country's first hotel, the Hotel Royal, and later when he created the Yak & Yeti Hotel and Restaurant.

== Early life and ballet career ==
Lisanevich was the youngest of three brothers. His great-grandfather Grigory Ivanovich Lisanevich fought at Borodino and his portrait was placed in the Military Gallery of the Winter Palace.

At age 9, Boris entered the Odessa Cadet Academy. In 1924 he moved to France. In Monte-Carlo he married a ballet dancer named Kira Shcherbacheva, who later died. This would eventually lead to him dancing with Diaghilev's Ballets Russes until 1929. Then Boris left for South America and continued dancing, including in London, Milan.

== India ==
However his work visa expired in the UK and he only had a League of Nations Refugee Passport. In the 1930s he got work in Bombay and traveled in Ceylon, Indochina, Malaya, Shanghai and then went back to India and stayed in Calcutta, where, with the help of his friends, he founded "Club 300". Lisanevich was the person who introduced the dish Chicken a la Kiev, to Calcutta as a menu item at "Club 300". The club was opened in 1936 and he ran it until 1946 and then left for New York City. Subsequently, he came back to India. Lisanevich made friends with Prince Emmanuel Golitsyn and in 1944 met and became friends with the Nepalese king Tribhuvan, who was in Calcutta for medical treatment. Lisanevich launched secret meetings of Tribhuvan with Indian prime minister Jawaharlal Nehru and participated in restoring Tribhuvan to power. Lisanevich married a Danish woman, Inger Pheiffer (died in 2013), whom he had met in Bombay. He had three sons with Inger: Mischa, Alexander and Nicholas, and one daughter Xenia from his previous marriage to Kira. In 1951, the king deposed the Rana family from power and invited Boris to Nepal as a tourist. Then, he got a job in Nepal where he managed tourism and served as a consultant to the government. The local Soviet embassy asked Lisanevich to organize a meeting for Valentina Tereshkova there.

== Nepal ==
At the time, Visas were difficult to obtain in Nepal. In an attempt to reform this process, Lisanevich convinced a group of 20 tourists from Kolkata (then Calcutta), mostly women, to come to Nepal in 1955 and then proceeded to have an intense discussion with the newly crowned King Mahendra about granting them a 15-day visa. Finally the king relented, the guests arrived and Boris held the country's first handicraft exhibition.

In 1951 Lisanevich opened the country's first hotel, The Hotel Royal with the Yak and Yeti Bar, in a converted Rana Palace with Prince Basundhara as his business partner. Once the Royal Hotel closed in 1969, he opened the Yak and Yeti restaurant in Lal Durbar with another business partner, who went on to found and establish the Hotel Yak and Yeti. Boris ran the restaurant as "The Chimney Room" in the newly established hotel bearing the name that Boris invented.

Lisanevich was buried in the cemetery of the British embassy in Kathmandu.
