= Prince Himalaya of Nepal =

Prince Himalaya
- Prince of Nepal
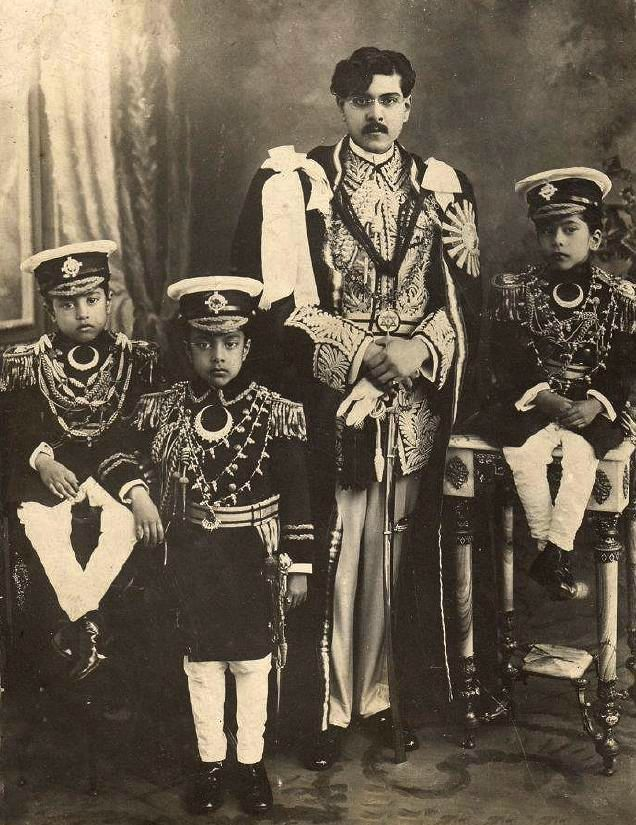
- King Tribhuvan and his sons; Mahendra (standing), Basundhara and Himalaya (sitting) in 1932.
- Born: 12 October 1921; Narayanhity Royal Palace, Kathmandu, Nepal
- Died: 9 May 1980 (aged 58); Kathmandu, Nepal
- Spouse: Princep Rajya Lakshmi Devi (m. 1945)
Names
- Himalaya Pratap Bir Bikram Shah
- House: Shah dynasty (by birth)
- Father: King Tribhuvan
- Mother: Kanti Rajya Lakshmi Devi
- Religion: Hinduism

Prince Himalaya Pratap Bir Bikram Shah, GBE, GCMG (12 October 1921 – 9 May 1980) was a son of Tribhuvan of Nepal and his first wife Kanti. He was a younger brother of Mahendra, and an uncle of Birendra and Gyanendra.

== Life ==
Himalaya, the second son of King Tribhuvan and his first wife Queen Kanti, was born in 1921. He was educated under private tutors. Himalaya represented the Nepali king on several occasions. He represented the Nepali king at the coronation of Queen Elizabeth II, at Westminster Abbey in London, in 1953.

From 1957 to 1959, Himalaya was the chairman of National Planning Commission. In 1959, he was the chairman of Tourism Development Council. The prince was the patron of Nepal Medical Association, 1951.

Himalaya married Princep Rajya Lakshmi Devi on March 5, 1945, in Kathmandu. She was from the aristocratic Rana dynasty.

Himalaya died on May 9, 1980, in Kathmandu.

== Honours ==
=== National honors ===
- Member of the Order of the Benevolent Ruler (1951).
- Member of the Tribhuvan Order of the Footprint of Democracy, 1st class.
- Member of the Order of the Star of Nepal, 1st class.
- King Mahendra Coronation Medal (2 May 1956).
- King Birendra Coronation Medal (24 February 1975).

=== Foreign Honours ===
- United Kingdom : Honorary Knight Grand Cross of the Order of the British Empire [GBE].
- United Kingdom : Honorary Knight Grand Cross of the Order of St Michael and St George [GCMG].
- United Kingdom : Queen Elizabeth II Coronation Medal (2 June 1953).
- Japan : Knight Grand Cordon of the Order of the Rising Sun.
- Japan : Knight Grand Cordon of the Order of the Chrysanthemum.
