= Juddha Barun Yantra =

Oldest fire brigade of Kathmandu, Nepal

Juddha Barun Yantra (Nepali: जुद्ध वरुण यन्त्र)or popularly known as Damkal (Nepali:दमकल) is the oldest fire brigade of Kathmandu, Nepal. Initially, it served for all districts inside the Kathmandu valley - namely Kathmandu, Bhaktapur and Patan and were operated under the Home Ministry with a central office at Newroad, Basantapur. However, with increasing demand, currently, the offices are run separately in each districts. Currently, it operates various fire engines. The refill is done at the nearest water sources or the reservoirs at Mahankal and Jorpati. It has 39 staffs — 11 from the Armed Police Force (APF), 10 from Metropolitan Police and 18 mobilised from the Home Ministry. The fire brigade can be called by dialing 101 from anywhere in Nepal.

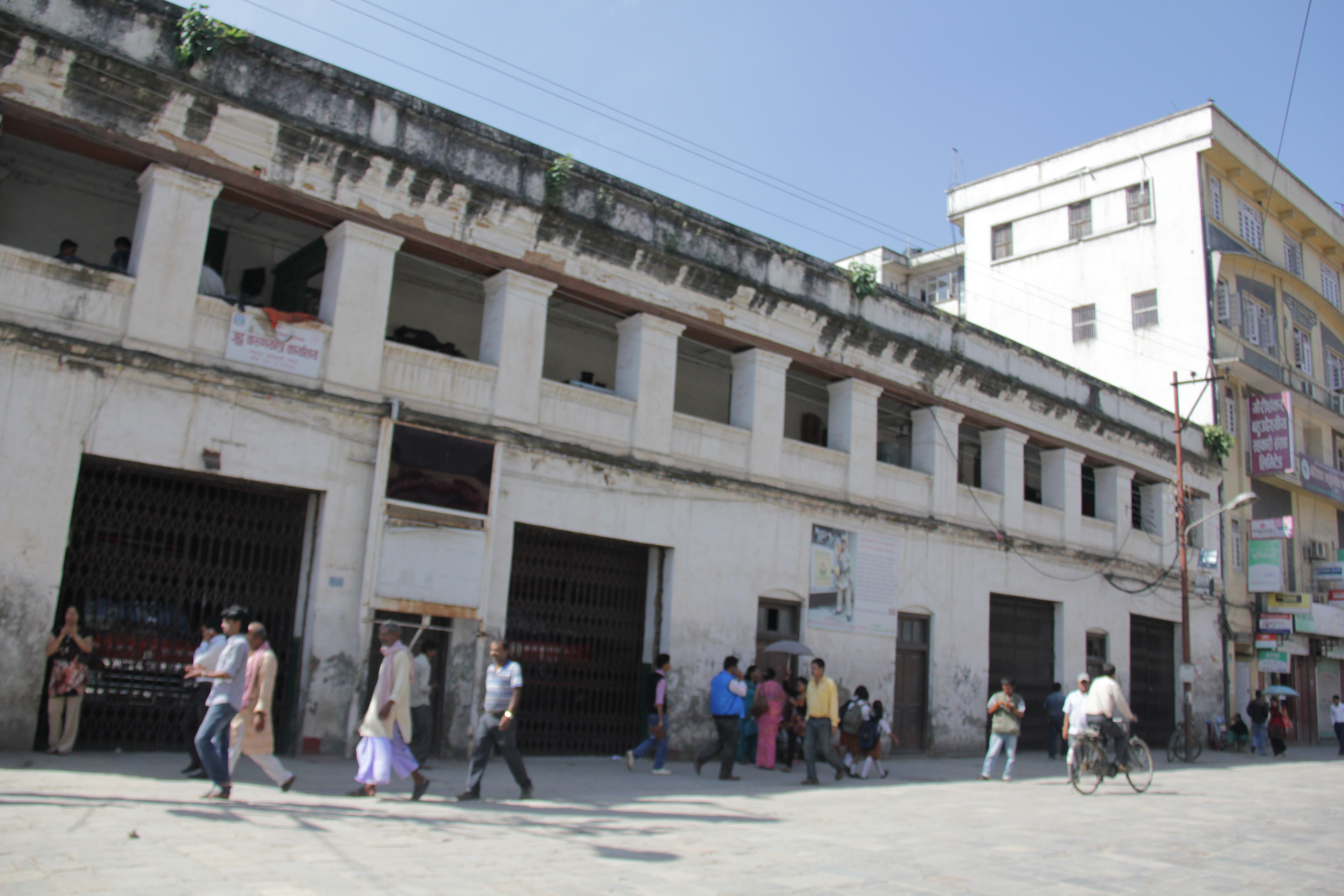
Judda Barun Yantra main office at Basantapur

The brigade handles about 600 cases annually.

== History ==
The first vehicle was brought from Germany by Juddha Shumsher Rana in 1937 AD. He was inspired by his visit to England to build the fire Brigade. Although fire accidents were rare, he managed to bring the first fire engine, Maurice, a fire engine brand from England. Maurice was transported via India through Bhimphedi and finally to Kathmandu. The engine was disassembled and carried by the porters, and later put together. This first fire engine rests as an exhibit in the back garage of the Juddha Barun Yantra (Damkal), Basantapur. Juddha Shumser also had constructed water hydrants around the city for the engine to get water from. Currently, the fire water hydrants have been demolished. In 1944, Juddha Barun Yantra extended its services to Patan and Bhaktapur.

== Capacity ==
The office has following fire engines:

- Maurice, UK, 1937 (Out of operation)
- Morita, German, Model: 1976, Capacity: 4,000 litre (Kathmandu-2 numbers)
- Magirus Deutz, German, Model: 1976, Capacity: 2,400 litre (Kathmandu-1, Patan-1, Bhaktapur-1)
- Bedford, UK, Model:1973, Capacity: 1500 litre (Bhaktapur -1)
- Dennis, UK, Model: 1945, Capacity 1,200 litre (Bhaktapur-1)
- They also operate fire engines and fire bikes.

A training center is under construction at Ramhiti in Kathmandu.

== Others ==
- The fire brigade is considered understaffed
- The staffs are uninsured and under trained to handle situations like crowd control
