= Durga Prasad Bhattarai =

Nepali career diplomat

His Excellency Durga Prasad Bhattarai
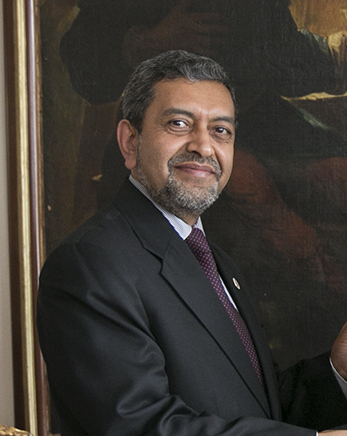
- Durga Prasad Bhattarai, 2016

Permanent Representative of Nepal to the United Nations
- Incumbent
- Assumed office 2013
- President: Ram Baran Yadav
- Preceded by: Gyan Chandra Acharya

Permanent Secretary of the Ministry of Foreign Affairs
- In office 2011–2013
- President: Ram Baran Yadav
- Preceded by: Madan Kumar Bhattarai
- Succeeded by: Shanker Das Bairagi

Personal details
- Born: 25 April 1961 (age 65)
- Education: Tribhuvan University, Kathmandu; Institute of Social Studies, The Hague

Durga Prasad Bhattarai (born 25 April 1961) is a Nepali career diplomat who is currently the Ambassador and Permanent Representative of Nepal to the United Nations in New York City. He serves concurrently as the Ambassador of Nepal to Bolivia, Ecuador, Peru and Venezuela.

== Career ==
Bhattarai was appointed to his current post in July 2013 and presented his credentials to Secretary-General Ban Ki-moon on August 19 of that year. At the UN, he was elected Chairman of the Fourth Committee (Special Political and Decolonization Committee) of the General Assembly during its 69th session, from 2014 to 2015. In June 2015 he was elected Chairman of the Fifth Committee (Administrative and Budgetary Committee) for its 70th session. He is also the Vice President of the UNDP/UNFPA/UNOPS Executive Board for 2015.

Before assuming his current post, Bhattarai served as the Permanent Secretary of Nepal's Ministry of Foreign Affairs. He was previously Ambassador Extraordinary and Plenipotentiary to Sri Lanka and the Maldives, from 2005 to 2009. From 2005 to 2006, he was President of the Colombo Plan Council. He served as Minister/Deputy Permanent Representative to the United Nations from 1998 to 2002.

As Joint Secretary of MOFA from 2002 to 2005, he headed the United Nations, International Organizations and International Law Division, and was Ministry Spokesman from 2004 to 2005. Prior to joining the foreign service, Bhattarai worked at the Ministry of Commerce, the Ministry of Home Affairs, the National Planning Commission, and the Cabinet Secretariat.

== Personal life ==
Bhattarai was educated at Tribhuvan University in Nepal, where he received a Bachelor of Laws and a Master of Business Administration. He holds an MA in Regional Development from the Institute of Social Studies (ISS) in The Hague, the Netherlands. He is married to Muna, and they have two children.
