= Princess Princep Shah of Nepal =

Nepali princess (1930–1982)

Princess Princep Shah
- Princess of Nepal
- Born: 16 March 1930; Bahadur Bhawan, Kathmandu, Nepal
- Died: 22 May 1982 (aged 52); Bangkok, Thailand
- Spouse: Prince Himalaya of Nepal (m. 1945; died 1980)
Names
- Princep Rajya Lakshmi Devi Shah of Nepal
- House: Rana dynasty (by birth); Shah dynasty (by marriage)
- Father: Nara Shamsher Jang Bahadur Rana
- Mother: Uma Rajya Lakshmi
- Religion: Hinduism

Princess Princep Rajya Lakshmi Devi Shah of Nepal (March 16, 1930 – May 22, 1982) was, by marriage, a princess of Nepal. She was the wife of Prince Himalaya of Nepal, the second son of King Tribhuvan of Nepal. She was a sister-in-law of King Mahendra and Prince Basundhara.

In 1963, she helped establish the Nepal Red Cross Society, chairing the organisation for 20 years. She was awarded the Nansen Refugee Award in 1969.

== Early life and education ==
Princess Princep Shah was born at the Bahadur Bhawan, Kathmandu, on March 16, 1930. She was the eldest daughter of General Nara Shamsher Jang Bahadur Rana, KCVO, sometime Inspector-General of the Royal Nepal Police, by his first wife, Uma Rajya Lakshmi, of Doti.

She studied Nepali literature at Tribhuvan University.

Princess Princep Shah was the older sister of Princess Helen Shah, first wife of her brother-in-law, Prince Basundhara of Nepal.

== Royal activities ==
Princep married Prince Himalaya of Nepal on March 5, 1945, in Kathmandu.

Along with her husband, Princess Princep attended the coronation of Queen Elizabeth II in 1953, at Westminster Abbey in London.

In 1965, the princess and her husband founded the Soaltee Crowne Plaza hotel, which was later renamed as the Soaltee Holiday Inn Crowne Plaza Kathmandu in 1994.

Princess Princep Shah was the founder of Nepal Red Cross Society in 1963. She chaired organisation for 20 years, including when it joined the International Committee of the Red Cross on October 1, 1964. She was one of several Nepali representatives to the United Nations, and a member of the Nepal Leprosy Relief Organization.

She was awarded the 1969 Nansen Refugee Award for her leadership of the Nepal Red Cross Society's support for Tibetan refugees in Nepal.

=== Styles ===
- Lady Princep Rajya Laxmi Kumari Rana (1930–1945).
- HRH Princess Princep Shah of Nepal (1945–1982).

== Death ==
Princess Princep died at the Samitivej Hospital, Bangkok, on 22 May 1982.

== Honours ==
=== National Honours ===
- Member of the Order of Om Rama Patta (24 February 1975).
- Member of the Order of the Three Divine Powers, 1st Class (2 May 1956).
- Member of the Order of Gurkha Right Hand, 1st Class (1965).
- King Mahendra Coronation Medal (2 May 1956).
- King Birendra Coronation Medal (24 February 1975).

=== Foreign Honours ===
- United Kingdom : Queen Elizabeth II Coronation Medal (2 June 1953).
- United Kingdom : Dame of Justice of the Most Venerable Order of Saint John [DStJ] (11 December 1975).

== See also ==
- Princess Helen Shah of Nepal
