= Life of Maharaja Sir Jung Bahadur of Nepal =

1909 Nepalese book

- Cover page
- Author: Padma Jung Rana
- Original title: जङ्गबहादुरको जीवनयात्रा
- Translator: Rambahadur Pahadi (in Nepali)
- Language: English
- Subject: Jung Bahadur Rana
- Genre: Biography
- Published: 1909
- Publication place: Nepal
- ISBN: 9789937331333
- OCLC: 654217945

Life of Maharaja Sir Jung Bahadur of Nepal (Nepali: जङ्गबहादुरको जीवनयात्रा) is a 1909 biography of Jung Bahadur Rana, founder of the Rana dynasty, written by Padma Jung Rana. The book gives an account of detailed information about Jung Bahadur. It is generally regarded as being filial biased and lacking research.
