= Rashtrapati Bhavan, Kathmandu =

Official residence of the President of Nepal

Rashtrapati Bhavan
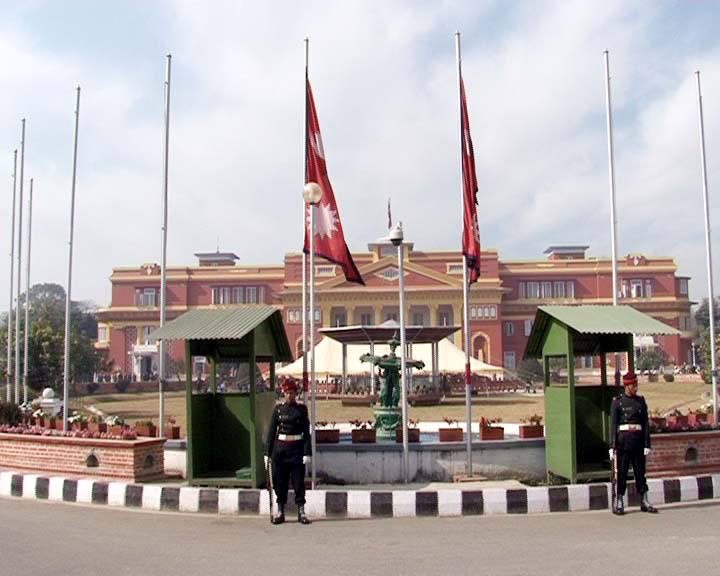
- Rashtrapati Bhavan

General information
- Architectural style: Neoclassical architecture, Palladian architecture and European styles of architecture
- Location: Maharajgunj, Kathmandu, Nepal
- Current tenants: Ram Chandra Paudel, President of Nepal
- Client: Chandra Shumsher Jung Bahadur Rana

Technical details
- Size: 140 ropani

Design and construction
- Architects: Kumar Narsingh Rana, Kishor Narsingh Rana

The Rashtrapati Bhavan (Nepali: राष्ट्रपति भवन, "Presidential Palace"), also known as Shital Niwas (Nepali: शीतलनिवास), is the official residence of the President of Nepal, located in Kathmandu. It houses the office of the President (Nepali: राष्ट्रपतिको कार्यालय). It was constructed by Prime Minister Chandra Shumsher Jung Bahadur Rana in 1923.

== History ==
The palace was built by then-Prime Minister Chandra Shumsher Jung Bahadur Rana for his youngest son Krishna Shumsher Jung Bahadur Rana from his first wife Lokbhakta Lakshmi Devi in the year 1924. Political pressure from his brothers forced Krishna Shamsher to hand over Sital Niwas to the Government of Nepal in 1948, and he fled to Bangalore in 1961. After the fall of the Rana Dyansty's regime, Sital Niwas was used by Government of Nepal as State Guest House and later as offices for the Ministry of Foreign Affairs.

The building was ransacked and set on fire by protesters during the 2025 Nepalese Gen Z protests.

== See also ==
- Rana palaces of Nepal
- Singha Durbar
