= Gyan Chandra Acharya =

Nepali ambassador to the United Kingdom

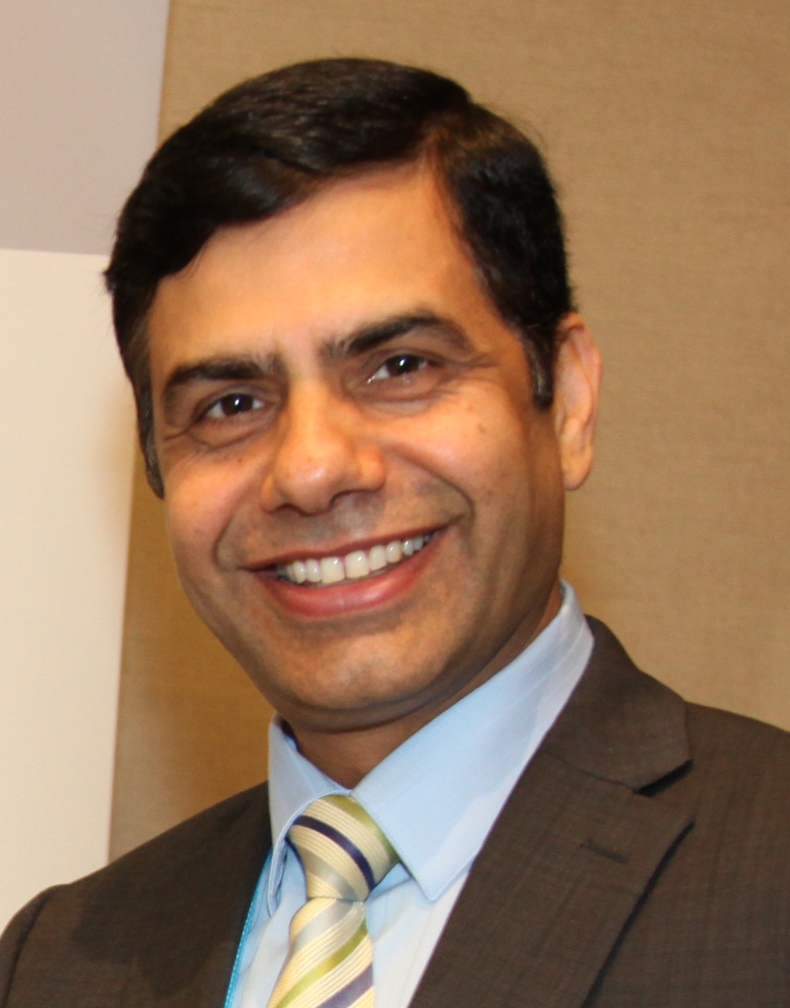

Nepali ambassador to the United Kingdom
- Incumbent
- Assumed office 2021

Foreign Secretary of Nepal
- In office 2007 – 2009

Personal details
- Education: Master of Economics
- Alma mater: Tribhuvan University

Gyan Chandra Acharya is the Nepali ambassador to the United Kingdom since January 2021, and the former United Nations Under-Secretary-General and High Representative for the Least Developed Countries, Landlocked Developing Countries and Small Island Developing States. He was appointed to this position by the UN Secretary-General Ban Ki-moon on 14 August 2012.

== Career ==
Previously, Acharya served as the Permanent Representative of Nepal to the UN. A veteran diplomat in the Nepalese foreign service, he worked on various global issues.

He is the Chair of the Global Coordination Bureau of the Group of Least Developed Countries and contributed to the successful conclusion of the Fourth United Nations Conference on the Least Developed Countries and the follow-up process. From 2010 to 2011, he was Chair of the Working Group on Lessons Learned of the Peace building Commission. He was also a Member of the Bureau of Landlocked developing countries and Chair of the Commission on Social Development.

From 2003 to 2007, Acharya was Nepal's representative to the UN and World Trade Organization (WTO) in Geneva. From 2007 to 2009, he was Nepal's Foreign Secretary.

== Personal life and education ==
Acharya obtained a Master of Economics degree from Tribhuvan University in Kathmandu, Nepal. He is married and has two children.
