= Bahadur Bhawan =

Palace in Kathmandu, Nepal

Bahadur Bhawan (Char Burja Durbar)
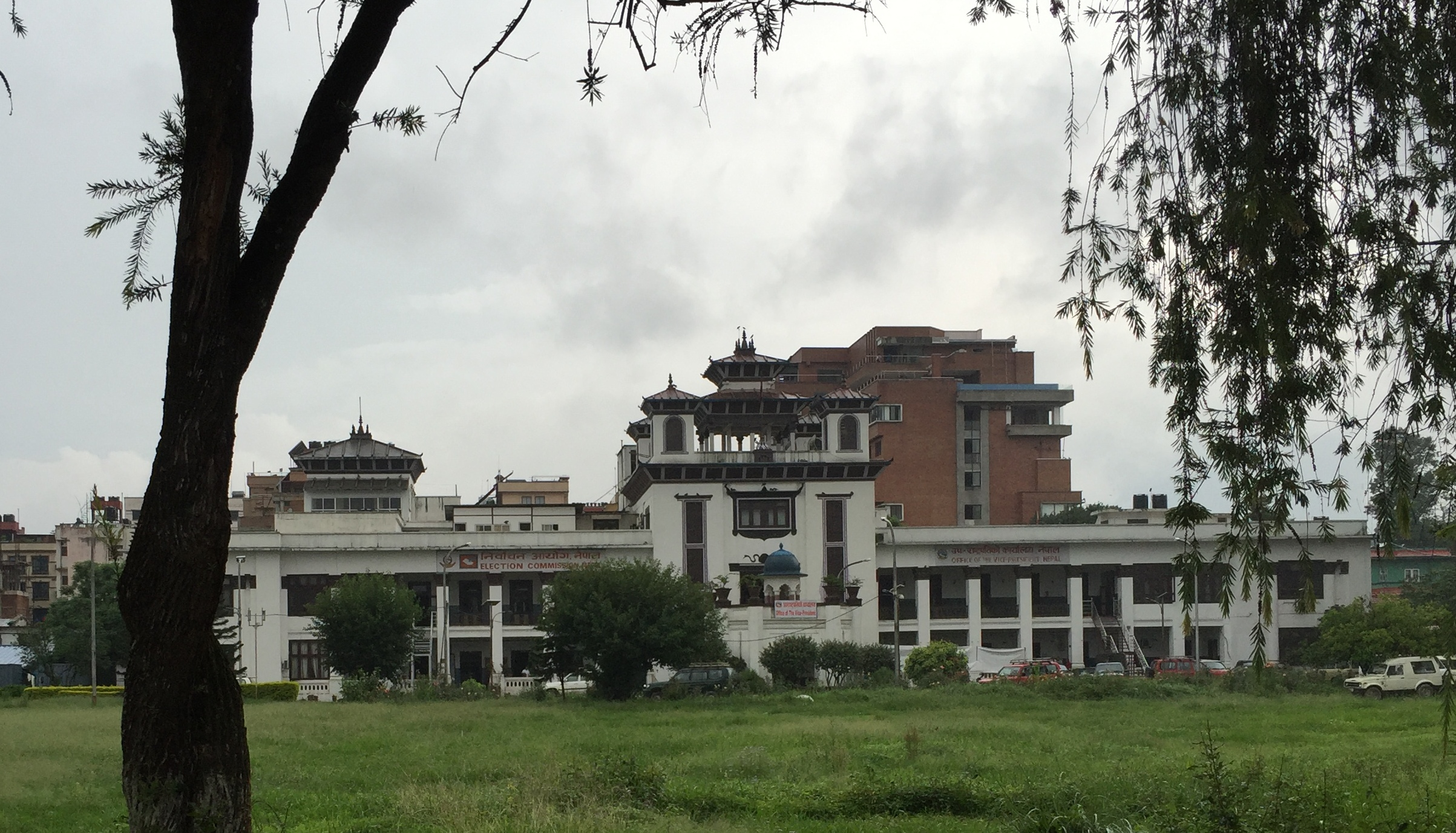

General information
- Architectural style: Neoclassical architecture and European styles of architecture
- Location: Kathmandu, Nepal
- Cost: Unknown
- Client: Bir Shumsher JBR, Rudra Shumsher Jung Bahadur Rana

Technical details
- Structural system: Brick and Mortar

Design and construction
- Architect: Jogbir Sthapit

Bahadur Bhawan (initially known as Char Burja Durbar) is a Rana palace in Kathmandu, the capital of Nepal. The palace was built by Bir Shumsher JBR and rebuilt by Rudra Shumsher JBR after its destruction by fire in BS 1962.

== History ==
The palace complex lay in the heart of Kathmandu, to the north of the Thamel and North of Naachghar.

=== Hotel Royal ===
There is a record of Hotel Royal being used by visitors to the Coronation of Mahendra of Nepal on Feb 12, 1959.

== Earthquake 2015 ==
Bahadur Bhawan suffered minor damage during the April 2015 Nepal earthquake, with heavier damage in the rear of the building.

== See also ==
- Babar Mahal
- Thapathali Durbar
- Boris Lisanevich
