= Padma Shumsher Jung Bahadur Rana =

Prime Minister of Nepal from 1945 to 1948

Field Marshal His Highness Shree Shree Shree Maharaja Sir Padma Shumsher Jung Bahadur Rana GCSI GCIE GBE
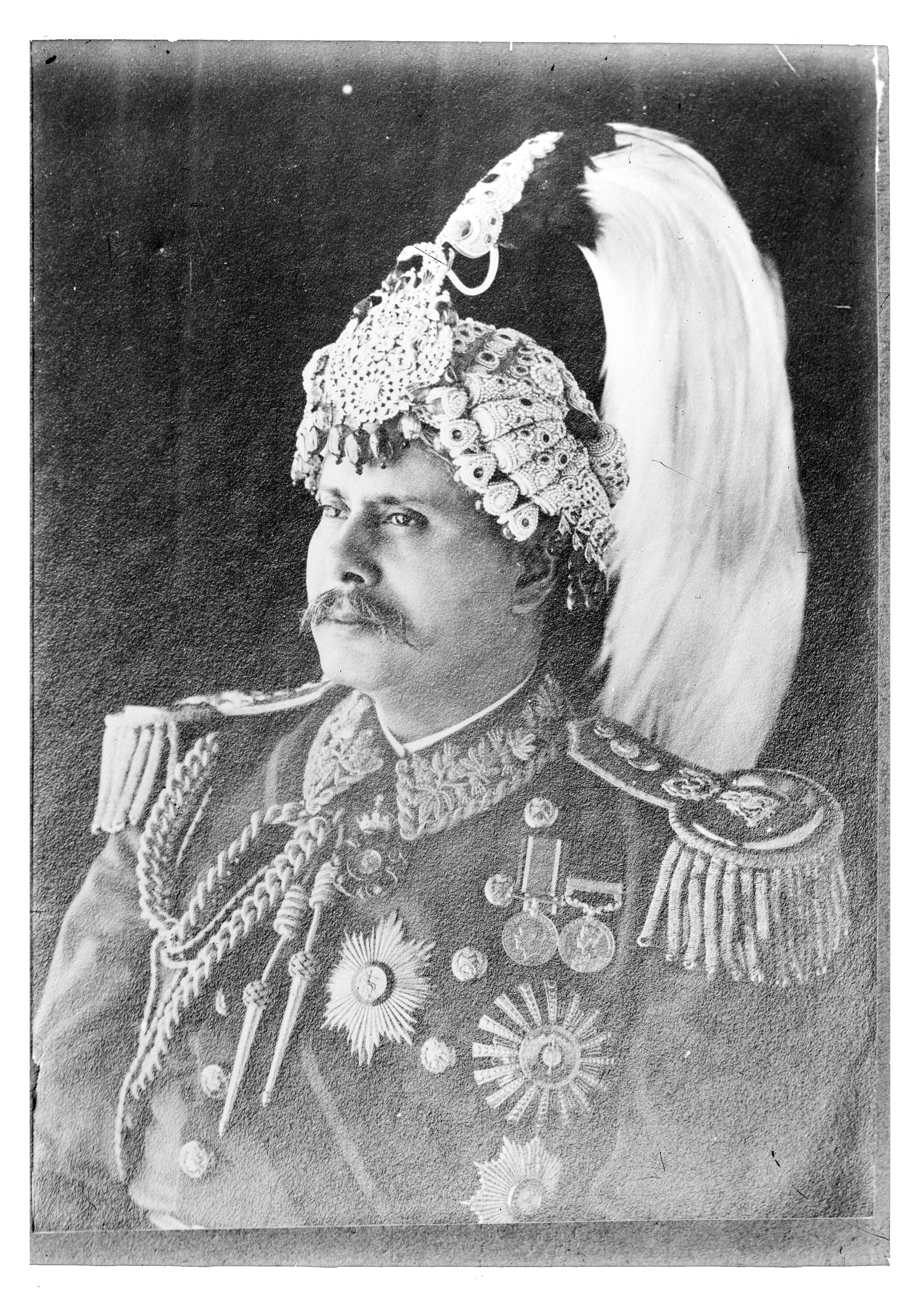
- Padma Shumsher Jung Bahadur Rana in the 1940s

Prime Minister of Nepal
- In office 29 November 1945 – 30 April 1948
- Monarch: King Tribhuvan
- Preceded by: Juddha Shamsher
- Succeeded by: Mohan Samsher

Personal details
- Born: 5 December 1882
- Died: 11 April 1961 (aged 78)
- Parent(s): Bhim Shamsher Jang Bahadur Rana (father); Jethi Maharani (mother)
- Occupation: Prime Minister of Nepal

Maharaja Sir Padma Shumsher Jung Bahadur Rana (Nepali: पद्म शम्शेर जङ्गबहादुर राणा; 5 December 1882 – Calcutta, India, 11 April 1961) was the hereditary prime minister of Nepal and Maharaja of Lamjung and Kaski from 29 November 1945 to 30 April 1948 as the head of the Rana dynasty. He was one of the first prime ministers of Nepal in over a century to advocate for social development, and even proclaimed himself to be "A servant of the nation".

== Reforms ==
In his short tenure as the Prime Minister, he performed numerous reforms in Nepal including: -

1. He began construction of the first east-west highway in Nepal. The highway was mainly intended to expedite the transport of mail and is also sometimes called Postal Highway.
2. Citing the lack of proper education in Nepal, he sent several teachers to various countries abroad to train. In addition, he also established several schools and college including Padmodaya high school and Padma Kanya multiple campus, which was also the first college to be established in Nepal for women.
3. He held the first ever election in the history of Nepal in the form of a municipal election.
4. He introduced the Government Act of Nepal in 26, January, 1948, although it was never fully implemented.

== Retirement ==
His liberal views and acts of reformation had led him to be threatened by his own family and hence, fearing for his life, he left for India on 1 March 1948 under the pretext of having a medical examination. There he met Indian prime minister Jawaharlal Nehru, who encouraged him to establish democracy in Nepal, but he decided to stay in India and not risk himself by returning to Nepal. He officially resigned from his position on 28 April 1948. Only after the fall of the Rana regime in 1951, did he occasionally visit Nepal. He remained in Calcutta until his death in 1961.

== Works ==
- Rana, Pudma Jung Bahadur (1909). Life of Maharaja Sir Jung Bahadur of Nepal. ISBN 9789937331333. OCLC 654217945.

Political offices
Preceded by Juddha Shumsher JBR	Prime Minister of Nepal; 1945–1948	Succeeded by Mohan Shumsher JBR
