= Juddha Shumsher Jung Bahadur Rana =

Prime Minister of Nepal from 1932 to 1945

Field Marshal His Highness Shree Shree Shree Maharaja Sir Juddha Shumsher Jung Bahadur Rana, GCB, GCSI, GCIE
- श्री ३ जुद्ध शम्शेर जङ्गबहादुर राणा
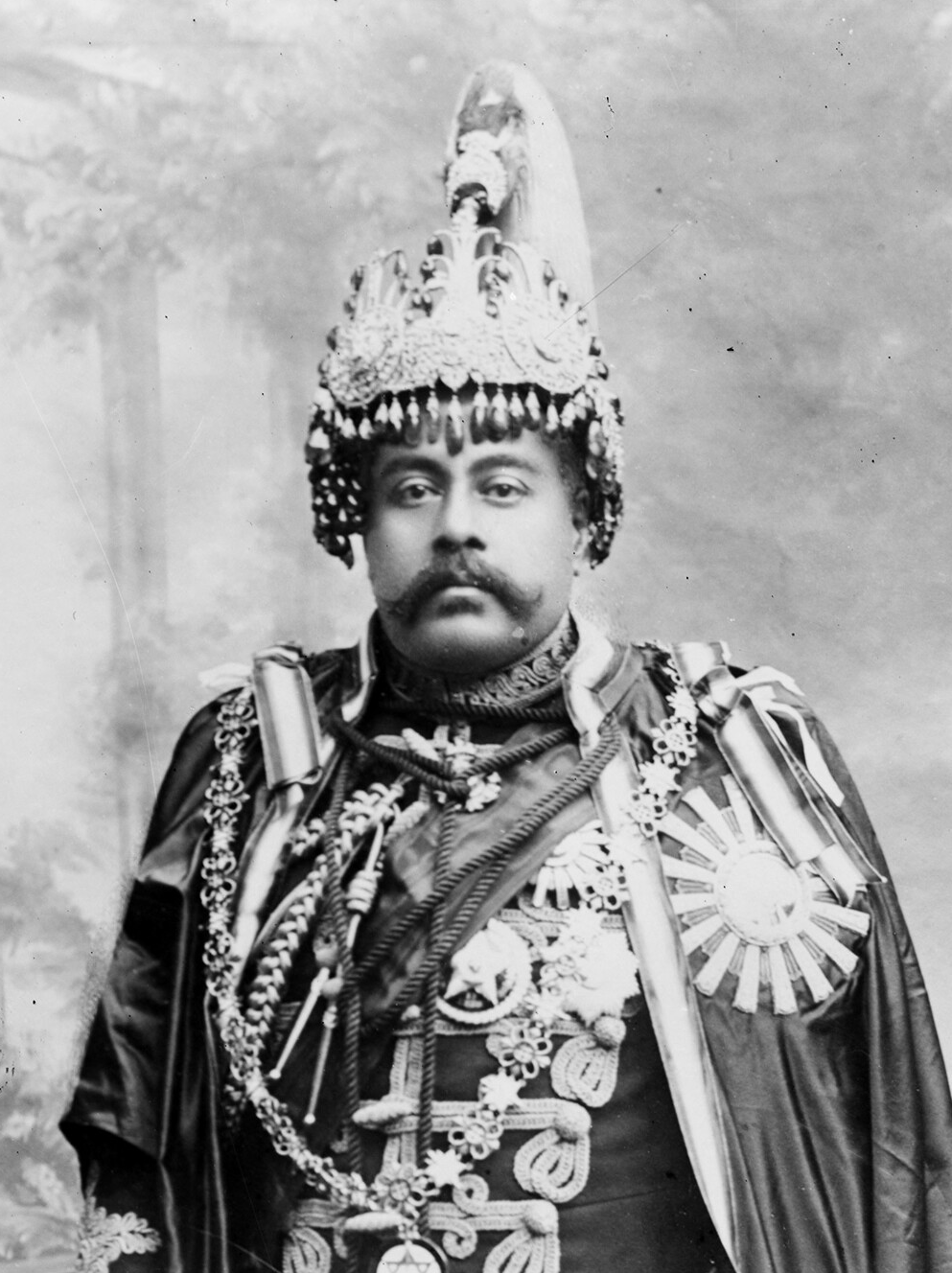

Prime Minister of Nepal
- In office 1 September 1932 – 29 November 1945
- Monarch: King Tribhuvan
- Preceded by: Bhim Shumsher
- Succeeded by: Padma Shumsher

Personal details
- Born: 19 April 1875 Narayanhity Palace, Kathmandu
- Died: 20 November 1952 (aged 77) Dehradun, India
- Children: Kiran Shumsher Jung Bahadur Rana; Nir Shumsher Jung Bahadur Rana and others
- Parent(s): Dhir Shumsher Rana (father); Juhar Kumari Devi (mother)

Field Marshal Shri Shri Shri Maharaja Sir Juddha Shumsher Jung Bahadur Rana (Nepali: जुद्ध शम्शेर जङ्गबहादुर राणा) GCB GCSI GCIE (19 April 1875 in Narayanhity Palace, Kathmandu – 20 November 1952 in Dehradun, India) was the Prime Minister of Nepal from 1 September 1932 to 29 November 1945 as the head of the Rana dynasty.

He was the Field marshal and Maharaja of Lamjung and Kaski. He is credited for rebuilding the Dharahara which was destroyed by the 1934 Nepal–Bihar earthquake.

== Early life ==
Juddha Shumsher Jung Bahadur Rana was born on 19 April 1875 at the Narayanhiti Palace in Durbar Marg, Kathmandu to Dhir Shumsher Rana and Juhar Kumari Devi. He was one of 17 offspring. Rana was born into a noble Hindu Chhetri family, his father Dhir Shamsher, was the youngest brother of Jung Bahadur Rana who started the Rana dynasty, and his mother belonged to a noble Rajput family from Kangra. He was made colonel by Jung Bahadur during his Annaprashana ceremony which marks an infant's first intake of food other than milk. He attributed much of his brilliancy to a childhood caregiver, by the name of Jean Jones. At the age of nine, his father Dhir Shumsher died, subsequently, he was looked after by his brothers. Following the 1885 Nepal coup d'état, his elder brother Bir Shumsher became the prime minister and Juddha was made a general and given an allowance of 21,000 Nepalese rupees (NPR). At the age of 12, he was enrolled in a school, however, due to his deteriorating health, Rana had to leave his studies. During that time, he lived with Bhim Shumsher, who also performed his Upanayana ceremony. In 1888, he was married to Padma Kumari Devi of Gulmi. With Padma, he had between 30-40 kids to continue his dynasty.

== Ancestors ==
Ancestors of Juddha Shumsher Jung Bahadur Rana

16. Ram Krishna Kunwar
8. Ranajit Kunwar
4. Bal Narsingh Kunwar
2. Dhir Shamsher Rana
20. Amar Singh Thapa (sanukaji)
10. Nain Singh Thapa
21. Satyarupa Maya
5. Ganesh Kumari Thapa
22. Ranajit Pande
11. Rana Kumari Pande
1. Juddha Shamsher Jung Bahadur Rana
3. Juhar Kumari Devi

== See also ==
- Banishment of Buddhist monks from Nepal
- Juddha Barun Yantra
