= Bhimsen Thapa =

Nepalese statesman (1775–1839)

Sri Mukhtiyar General Bhimsen Thapa
- श्री मुख्तियार जर्नेल भीमसेन थापा
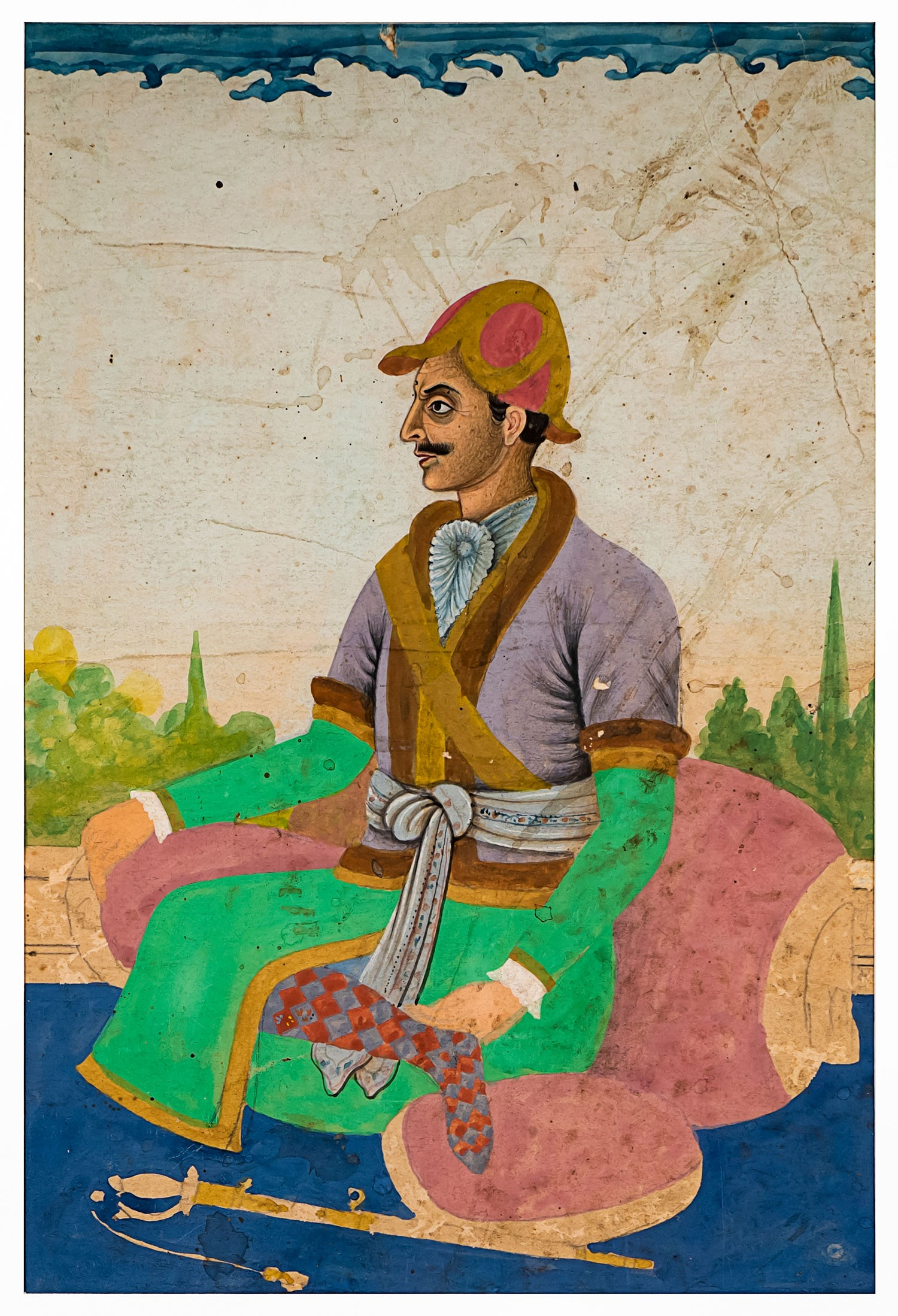
- Posthumous portrait by Anandamuni Shakya, 1937

Prime Minister of Nepal (Mukhtiyar)
- In office 1806–1837
- Monarchs: Girvan Yuddha Bikram Shah; Rajendra Bikram Shah
- Preceded by: Rana Bahadur Shah as Mukhtiyar
- Succeeded by: Rana Jang Pande

Pradhan Senapati (Chief General) & Commander-In-Chief of the Nepalese Army
- In office 1811- 14 June 1837
- Preceded by: Damodar Pande as Pradhan Senapati
- Succeeded by: Rajendra Bikram Shah

Personal details
- Born: August 1775 Pipal Thok village, Gorkha region, Kingdom of Nepal (present-day Pipal Thok, Bhimsen Thapa R.M., Gorkha district, Gandaki Province, Nepal)
- Died: 29 July 1839 (aged 63) Bhim-Mukteshwar, bank of Bishnumati River, Kathmandu, Nepal
- Relations: see Thapa dynasty, Pande dynasty, Kunwar family, Rana dynasty
- Children: Lalita Devi Pande; Janak Kumari Pande; Dirgha Kumari Pande
- Parents: Amar Singh Thapa (Sana) (father); Satyarupa Maya (mother)

Military service
- Allegiance: Kingdom of Nepal
- Branch/service: Nepal Army
- Years of service: 1798–1837
- Rank: Commander-in-Chief
- Commands: Commander-in-Chief
- Battles/wars: Anglo-Nepalese War

Bhimsen Thapa (Note: (Nepali: भीमसेन थापा) (born August 1775 – 29 July 1839) was a Nepalese statesman who served as the Mukhtiyar (Note: The position of Mukhtiyar was roughly equivalent to a prime minister. The first Mukhtiyar to title himself as a prime minister, as per the British convention, was Bhimsen's nephew, Mathabar Singh Thapa.) (equivalent to prime minister) and de facto ruler of Nepal from 1806 to 1837. He is widely known as the first and the longest-serving prime minister of Nepal. He was inducted into the "National heroes of Nepal" by King Mahendra Bir Bikram Shah.

Born into an ordinary military family in the Gorkha Kingdom, Bhimsen first came close to the Crown Prince Rana Bahadur Shah at an early age in 1785. In 1798, he was recruited as a bodyguard for the King by his father. Thereafter, he rose to influence after helping the exiled ex-King Rana Bahadur Shah engineer his return to power in 1804. In gratitude, Rana Bahadur made Bhimsen a Kaji (equivalent to a minister) of the newly formed government. Rana Bahadur's assassination by his stepbrother Sher Bahadur Shah in 1806 led Bhimsen to initiate investigations into the context in which he ordered the death penalty for ninety-three people popularly known as the 1806 Bhandarkhal massacre, after which he claimed the title of Mukhtiyar (equivalent to prime minister) himself. The death of King Girvan Yuddha Bikram Shah in 1816 at the immature age of 17, with his heir, King Rajendra Bikram Shah being only 3 years old, along with the support from Queen Tripurasundari (the junior queen of Rana Bahadur Shah) allowed him to remain in power even after Nepal's defeat in the Anglo-Nepalese War. After the death of Queen Tripurasundari in 1832, the intrigues of the newly adult King Rajendra, the conspiracies and infightings with the British envoy Brian Houghton Hodgson, Senior Queen Samrajya Laxmi Devi and the rival courtiers (especially the Kala Pandes, who held Bhimsen Thapa responsible for the death of Damodar Pande in 1804) finally led to his imprisonment on false charges of the murder of an infant prince and ultimately his death by suicide in 1839.

Bhimsen Thapa is remembered for being the first Nepalese statesman to fully comprehend the British system of protectorate in India carried out by Lord Wellesley and his subsequent activities to keep British authorities at bay and prevent the Kingdom of Nepal from being a part of the British Empire through long and persistent anti-British politics during both wartime and peacetime. The territorial expanse of the Gurkha empire had reached its greatest extent from the Sutlej River in the west to the Teesta River in the east during his prime ministership. However, Nepal entered into a disastrous Anglo-Nepalese War with the partially British Empire-owned East India Company lasting from 1814 to 1816, which was concluded with the Treaty of Sugauli, by which Nepal lost almost one-third of its land. He is widely remembered for bringing about a large number of social, religious, economic, and administrative reforms, as well as the modernization of the Nepalese Army on the template of the French military forces. During his lifetime, he commissioned the construction of many temples and monuments including the highly famed Dharahara also known as Bhimsen Stambha ("Bhimsen Tower").

Widely considered one of the 19th century's most significant figures in Nepalese history, Bhimsen is seen as a patriotic, clever, and diplomatic statesman who played an important role in defending his country against then-widespread British colonial imperialism in South Asia. His foreign policy was largely motivated by rational national interest, national sustenance and nationalism. He is also well praised as a reformer and for his efficient systematization and management of the state administration, programmes and policies. However, he has been criticized for instigating an inhumane political massacre in his early political career, the elimination of his political rivals and the consolidation of political and military power within his family.

== Early years ==
Bhimsen's ancestral Bagale Thapa clan flag

Bhimsen Thapa (Note: His given name Bhimsen is the name of one of the Pandu princes i.e Bhimasena. The name is an amalgamation of two words; Bhim (Sanskrit: भीम, lit. 'formidable') and Sena (Sanskrit: सेना, lit. 'army') which derives to "one who is equivalent to a formidable army".) was born in August 1775 at Pipal Thok village of Gorkha district, to father Amar Singh Thapa (sanu) (Note: Not to be confused with the better-known commander of Gorkhali forces in the Gurkha War with the same name i.e. Amar Singh Thapa. The two Amar Singh Thapas are differentiated by the qualifier Bada (greater) and Sanu (lesser).) and mother Satyarupa Maya. His ancestors were members of Bagale Thapa clan from Jumla who migrated eastwards. His grandfather was Bir Bhadra Thapa, a courtier in Prithvi Narayan Shah's army. Bhimsen Thapa had four brothers — Nain Singh, Bakhtawar Singh, Amrit Singh, and Ranbir Singh. From his step-mother, he had two brothers — Ranbam and Ranzawar. While it is not certain when Bhimsen got married, he had three wives with whom he had one son, that died at an early age in 1796, and three daughters – Lalita Devi, Janak Kumari and Dirgha Kumari. Lack of a son caused him to adopt Sher Jung Thapa, son or grandson of his brother Nain Singh. (Note: Historian Kumar Pradhan referred Sher Jung Thapa as "son of Nain Singh Thapa" while historian Baburam Acharya referred him as "son of Ujir Singh Thapa".)

Not much detail is known about Bhimsen Thapa's early life. At the age of 11, Bhimsen came into contact with the Nepalese Royal Palace when his Bratabandha (sacred thread) ceremony was held together with the Crown Prince Rana Bahadur Shah in Gorkha in 1785. In 1798, his father took him to Kathmandu and enrolled him as a bodyguard to the king. In Kathmandu, Bhimsen took up residence at Thapathali, after which he lived in Bagh Durbar near Tundikhel after becoming a Kaji (equivalent to a minister).

== Rise to power: 1798–1804 ==
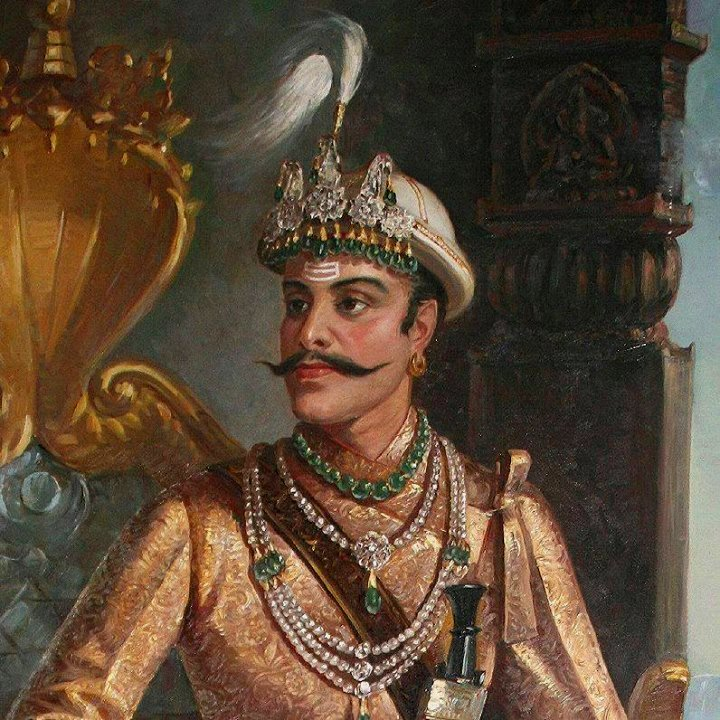
King Rana Bahadur Shah, the King of Nepal from 1777 to 1799.

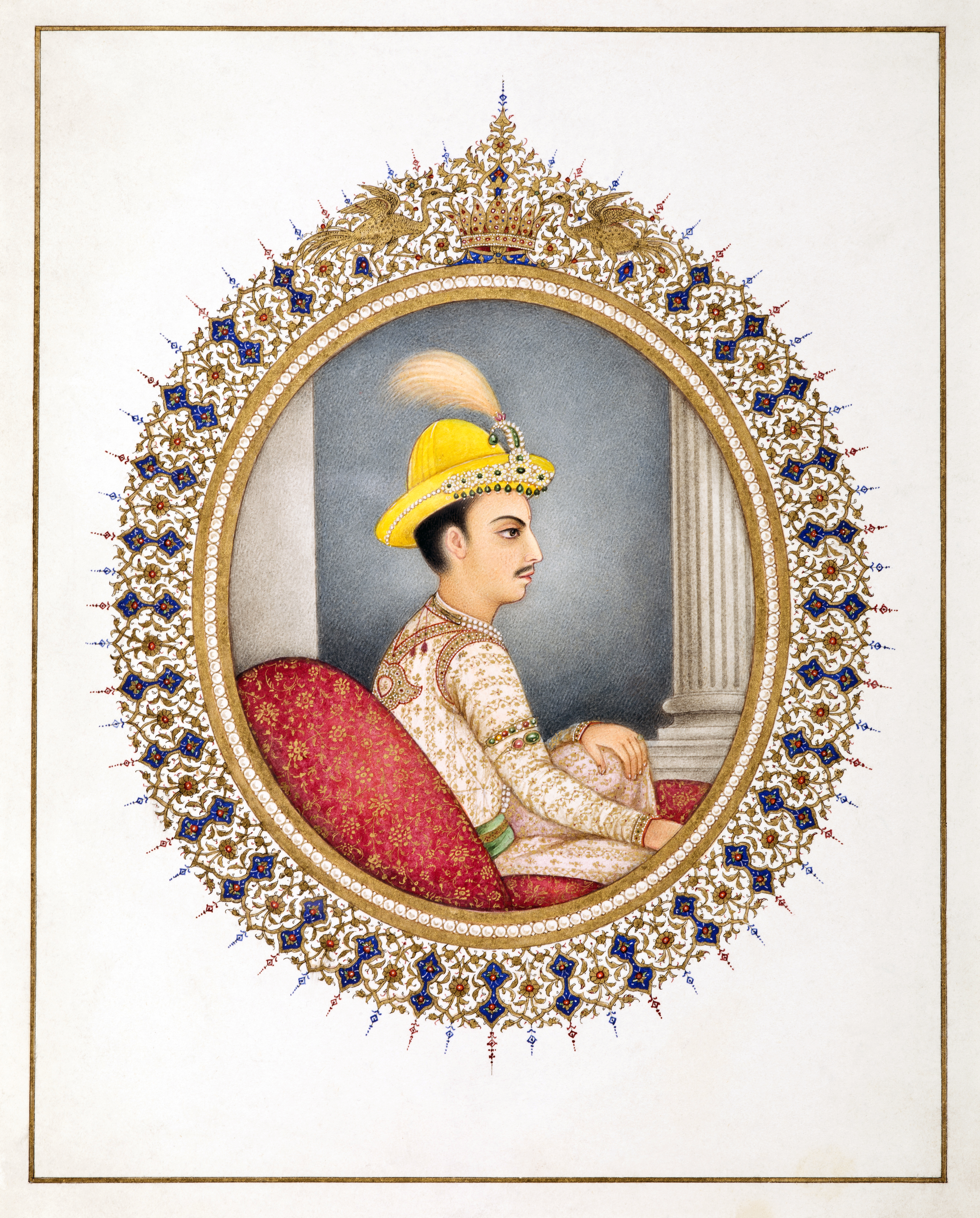
King Girvan Yuddha Bikram Shah, the King of Nepal (1799–1816)

=== Royal household ===
The premature death of Pratap Singh Shah (reigned 1775–77), the eldest son of Prithvi Narayan Shah, left a huge power vacuum that remained unfilled, seriously debilitating the emerging Nepalese state. Pratap Singh Shah's successor was his son, Rana Bahadur Shah (reigned 1777–99), aged two and one-half years at his accession. The acting regent until 1785 was Queen Rajendra Lakshmi, followed by Bahadur Shah (reigned 1785–94), the second son of Prithvi Narayan Shah. Court life was consumed by rivalry centered on alignments with these two regents rather than on issues of national administration, and it set a bad precedent for future competition among contending regents. The exigencies of Sino-Nepalese War in 1788–92 had forced Bahadur Shah to temporarily take a pro-British stance, which had led to a commercial treaty with the British in 1792.

Meanwhile, Rana Bahadur Shah's youth had been spent in pampered luxury. In 1794 Rana Bahadur came of age, and his first act was to re-constitute the government, with his uncle, Bahadur Shah, removed from all official position. In mid-1795, he became infatuated with a Maithili Brahman widow, Kantavati Jha, and married her on the oath of making their illegitimate half-caste son (as per the Hindu law of that time) the heir apparent, by excluding the legitimate heir from his previous marriage. (Note: Rana Bahadur Shah had two legitimate wives before marrying Kantavati. His first wife was Rajrajeshwori Devi with whom he begot one daughter. His second wife was Subarnaprabha Devi with whom he begot two sons, Ranodyot Shah and Shamsher Shah. Ranodyot Shah was the eldest male heir apparent of Rana Bahadur Shah.) By 1797, his relationship with his uncle, who was living a retired life, and who wanted to seek refuge in China on the pretext of meeting the new emperor, had deteriorated to the extent that he ordered his imprisonment on 19 February 1797 and his subsequent murder on 23 June 1797. Such acts earned Rana Bahadur notoriety both among courtiers and common people, especially among Brahmins.

That same year in 1797, Girvan Yuddha Bikram Shah was born and was hastily declared the crown prince. However, within a year of Girvan's birth, Kantavati contracted tuberculosis; and it was advised by physicians that she perform ascetic penances to cure herself. To make sure that Girvan succeeded to the throne while Kantavati was still alive, Rana Bahadur, aged just 23, abdicated in favor of their son on 23 March 1799, placing his first wife, Rajrajeshwori, as the regent. He joined his ailing wife, Kantavati, with his second wife, Subarnaprabha, in ascetic life and started living in Deopatan, donning saffron robes and titling himself Swami Nirgunanda or Nirvanananda. (Note: From here on Rana Bahadur Shah became known as Swami Maharaj. Rana Bahadur, however, was an ascetic in name only. Although Rana Bahadur left the royal duties after his abdication, he did not relinquish any of its privileges and luxuries.) This move was also supported by all the courtiers who were discontented with his wanton and capricious behavior. It was around this time that both Bhimsen Thapa and his father Amar Singh Thapa (sanu) were promoted from Subedar to the rank of Sardar, and Bhimsen began to serve as the ex-King's chief bodyguard. Bhimsen received the position of personal secretary of King Rana Bahadur from the patronage of Mulkaji Kirtiman Singh Basnyat, since both his father and grandfather were in close military affiliations with Kaji Abhiman Singh Basnyat - the uncle of Kirtiman Singh. Meanwhile, Rana Bahadur's renunciation lasted only a few months. After the inevitable death of Kantavati, Rana Bahadur suffered a mental breakdown during which he lashed out by desecrating temples and cruelly punishing the attendant physicians and astrologers. He then renounced his ascetic life and attempted to re-assert his royal authority. This led to a direct conflict with almost all the courtiers who had pledged a holy oath of allegiance to the legitimate King Girvan; this conflict eventually led to the establishment of a dual government and to an imminent civil war, with Damodar Pande leading the military force against the dissenting ex-King and his group. Since most of the military officers had sided with the courtiers, Rana Bahadur realized that his authority could not be re-established; and he was forced to flee to the British-controlled city of Varanasi in May 1800.

=== Exile in Varanasi: 1800–1804 ===
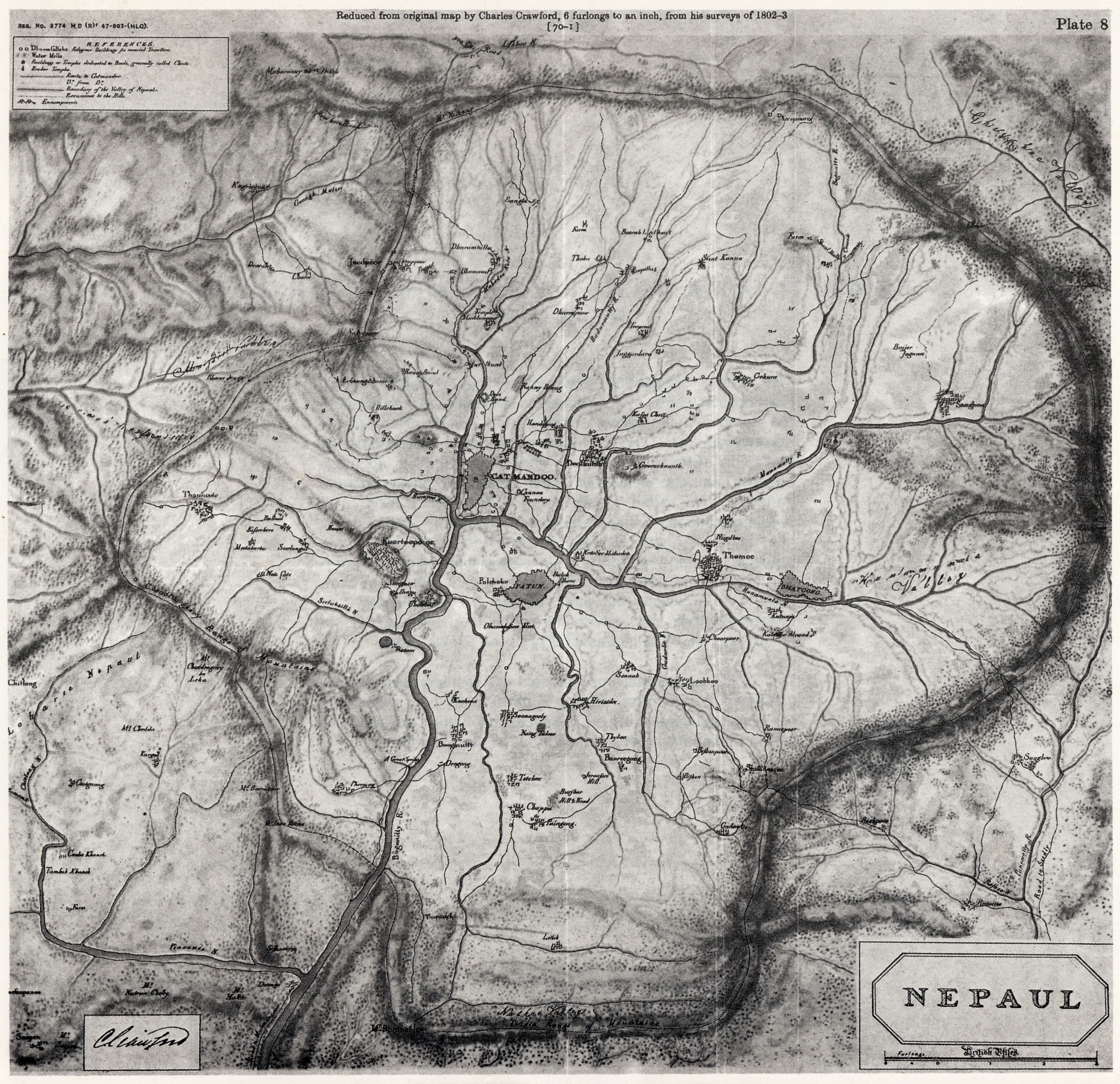
Map of Kathmandu Valley made by Charles Crawford (a member of Captain Knox's entourage) in 1802–03.

As Rana Bahadur Shah's bodyguard and advisor, Sardar Bhimsen Thapa also accompanied him to Varanasi. Rana Bahadur's retinue included his first wife, Raj Rajeshwari Devi, while his second wife, Subarna Prabha Devi, stayed back in Kathmandu to serve as the regent. Since Rana Bahadur was willing to do anything to regain his power and punish those who had forced him to exile, he served as a focal point of dissident factions in Varanasi. In November 1800, he first sought help from the British in exchange for which he was willing to concede a trading post in Kathmandu and grant them 37.5% of the tax revenue derived from the hills and 50% from the Terai. However, the British were in favor of working with the existing government in Nepal, rather than risk the uncertainties of restoring an exiled ex-King to power.

The Kathmandu Durbar was willing to appease the British and agreed to sign a commercial treaty so long as the wayward Rana Bahadur and his group were held in India under strict British surveillance. This arrangement was kept a secret from Rana Bahadur and his group; but when they eventually became aware of the strictures on their movement, and hence the treaty, they were incensed at the British as well as the proponents (Damodar Pande and his faction) of this treaty in Nepal. An intrigue was set in motion with the aim of splitting the unity of courtiers in Kathmandu Durbar and fomenting anti-British feelings. A flurry of letters was exchanged between the former king and individual courtiers in which he tried to set them up against Damodar Pande and tried to woo them by promises of high government positions, which they could hold for their entire life, and which could be inherited by their progeny. Baburam Acharya holds Bhimsen responsible for all these schemes, reasoning that Rana Bahadur did not have the mental capacity for such negotiations and intrigues. He contends that Bhimsen was responsible for negotiation with the British as well as responsible for writing letters in the name of the ex-King, while the ex-King was biding his time in debauchery. (Note: Rana Bahadur Shah wrote the following letters: A letter to his brother, Chautariya Sher Bahadur Shah, in an attempt to win him over. He asked Chautariya Sher Bahadur Shah to look properly after King Girvan. The letters Rana Bahadur Shah wrote to Chautariya Sher Bahadur Shah also gave expression to brotherly affection, although it was Chautariya Sher Bahadur Shah himself who finally assassinated him. Rana Bahadur Shah also asked Chautariya Sher Bahadur Shah to make efforts to free him from detention. He wrote, Do whatever is possible so that the reign of (King Girvan) may be stable, the people who have come to Nepal from other countries may not be able to continue staying there and I may become free from detention and be able to come back to Nepal.Rana Bahadur Shah also wrote, The treaty is only a pretext to create a split between you and me and make Krishna Shah King. This is the reason why Gajaraj Mishra and Damodar Pande have joined hands. He thus warned Chautariya Sher Bahadur Shah that the Bhardars were hatching a conspiracy to banish King Girvan to Gorkha.; Rana Bahadur Shah wrote similar letters to Chautariya Bidur Shahi also.; In addition, Rana Bahadur Shah wrote letters to a member of the Council of Kajis, Bakhtawar Singh Basnyat, a brother of the murdered Kaji Kirtiman Basnet. In these letters, Rana Bahadur Shah asked Bakhtawar Singh not only to make arrangements to free him from detention but also to beware of Gajraj Mishra, who had had the main hand in concluding the treaty with the British. He wrote, Gajaraj Mishra may try to win you over, or intimidate you, in our name as well as in that of our eldest queen. However, I have not sent him to Nepal. In fact, he has gone there in contravention of my order. Let nobody believe there that he has come there with my consent.; Bhimsen Thapa and other followers too had written letters to Bakhatwar Singh Basnet referring to the detention of Rana Bahadur Shah and expressing opposition to the British, who had entered into Nepal. He viewed the British Residents to have interfered in the administration of native states, encourage factionalism and ultimately converted such states into British colonies.) Similarly, historian Chittaranjan Nepali considered that in addition to the realization of the motive of Nepali Bharadars to detain Rana Bahadur's retinue in Banaras, Bhimsen also had fully realized the real meaning of the system of protectorates adopted by the East India Company Government.

Meanwhile, Rajrajeshwari, perhaps due to frustration over her debauched husband (Note: The exact reason for Rajrajeshwari's departure from Varanasi is a matter of controversy. In Varanasi, Rana Bahadur had sold all her jewelry to support his dissipation and had acquired many new wives and concubines. He regularly mistreated Rajrajeshwari and once even humiliated her in public before a prostitute. So, her sense of frustration could have made her leave Varanasi.), or due to political reasons (Note: Historian Chittaranjan Nepali argues the return of Rajrajeshwari Devi as a planned political step executed by Rana Bahadur on the advice of Bhimsen. He proclaims the assertion through the contemporary documents, Vamshavalis ('Genealogies') and a letter of Rajeshrajeshwari to Rana Bahadur for loan repayment in Banaras. Furthermore, the comments of British historians who had accompanied with Resident Knox such as Francis Buchanan-Hamilton, considered Rajrajeshwari's return as dishevelment to the British India-Nepal relations.), left Varanasi, crossed the border of Nepal on 26 July 1801, and taking advantage of the weak regency, was slowly making her way towards Kathmandu with the view of taking over the regency. Back in Kathmandu, the court politics turned complicated when Mulkaji (or chief minister) Kirtiman Singh Basnyat, a favorite of the Regent Subarnaprabha, was secretly assassinated on 28 September 1801, by the supporters of Rajrajeswori. In the resulting confusion, many courtiers were jailed, while some executed, based solely on rumors. Bakhtawar Singh Basnyat, brother of assassinated Kirtiman Singh, was then given the post of Mulkaji. During his tenure as the Mulkaji, on 28 October 1801, a Treaty of Commerce and Alliance (Note: The treaty was signed by Gajraj Misra, on the behalf of Nepal Durbar, and Charles Crawford, on the behalf of East India Company, in Danapur, India. Among the articles in the treaty, it decided on perpetual peace and friendship between the two states, on the pension for Rana Bahadur Shah, the establishment of a British Residency in Kathmandu, and an establishment of trade relations between the two states.) was finally signed between Nepal and East India Company. This led to the establishment of the first British Resident, Captain William O. Knox, who was reluctantly welcomed by the courtiers in Kathmandu on 16 April 1802. (Note: Knox had previously accompanied Captain William Kirkpatrick in the 1792 British diplomatic mission to Nepal as a lieutenant in charge of the military escort. In Knox's 1801 mission, he was accompanied by experts like the naturalist Francis Buchanan-Hamilton, who later published An Account of the Kingdom of Nepal in 1819, and the surveyor Charles Crawford, who made the first scientific maps of Kathmandu valley and of Nepal, and proposed that the Himalayas might be among the highest mountains in the world.) The primary objective of Knox's mission was to bring the trade treaty of 1792 into full effect and to establish a "controlling influence" in Nepali politics. Almost eight months after the establishment of the Residency, Rajrajeshwari finally managed to assume the regency on 17 December 1802.

=== Return to Kathmandu ===
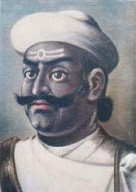
Portrait of Mulkaji Damodar Pande (1752–1804).

After Rajrajeshwori took over the regency, she was pressured by Knox to pay the annual pension of 82,000 rupees to the ex-King as per the obligations of the treaty, which paid off the vast debt that Rana Bahadur Shah had accumulated in Varanasi due to his spendthrift habits. (Note: Rana Bahadur had borrowed a lot of money from many different people: Rs 60,000 from Dwarika Das; Rs 100,000 from Raja Shivalal Dube; Rs 1,400 from Ambasankar Bhattnagar. Similarly, he had borrowed a lot of money from the East India Company as well. However, Rana Bahadur was reckless in the manner he spent the borrowed money. For instance, he had once given an alms of Rs 500 to a Brahmin. For more details see) The Nepalese court also felt it prudent to keep Rana Bahadur in isolation in Nepal itself, rather than in the British controlled India, and that paying off Rana Bahadur's debts could facilitate his return at an opportune moment. Rajrajeshwari's presence in Kathmandu also stirred unrest among the courtiers that aligned themselves around her and Subarnaprabha. Sensing an imminent hostility, Knox aligned himself with Subarnaprabha and attempted to interfere with the internal politics of Nepal. Getting a wind of this matter, Rajrajeshwari dissolved the government and elected new ministers, with Damodar Pande as the Mulkaji, while the Resident Knox, finding himself persona non grata and the objectives of his mission frustrated, voluntarily left Kathmandu to reside in Makwanpur citing a cholera epidemic. Subarnaprabha and the members of her faction were arrested.

Such open display of anti-British feelings and humiliation prompted the Governor General of the time Richard Wellesley to recall Knox to India and unilaterally suspend the diplomatic ties. The Treaty of 1801 was also unilaterally annulled by the British on 24 January 1804. The suspension of diplomatic ties also gave the Governor General a pretext to allow the ex-King Rana Bahadur to return to Nepal unconditionally.

As soon as they received the news, Rana Bahadur and his group proceeded towards Kathmandu. Some troops were sent by Kathmandu Durbar to check their progress, but the troops changed their allegiance when they came face to face with the ex-King. Damodar Pande and his men were arrested at Thankot where they were waiting to greet the ex-King with state honors and take him into isolation. After Rana Bahadur's reinstatement to power, he started to extract vengeance on those who had tried to keep him in exile. He exiled Rajrajeshwari to Helambu, where she became a Buddhist nun, on the charge of siding with Damodar Pande and colluding with the British. Damodar Pande, along with his two eldest sons, who were completely innocent, was executed on 13 March 1804; similarly some members of his faction were tortured and executed without any due trial, while many others managed to escape to India. (Note: Among those who managed to escape to India were Damodar Pande's sons Karbir Pande and Ranjang Pande.) Rana Bahadur also punished those who did not help him while in exile. Among them was Prithvi Pal Sen, the king of Palpa, who was tricked into imprisonment, while his kingdom forcefully annexed. Subarnaprabha and her supporters were released and given a general pardon. Those who had helped Rana Bahadur to return to Kathmandu were lavished with rank, land, and wealth. Bhimsen Thapa was made a second kaji; Ranajit Pande, who was the father-in-law of Bhimsen's brother, was made the Mulkaji; Sher Bahadur Shah, Rana Bahadur's half-brother, was made the Mul Chautariya; while Ranga Nath Paudel was made the Raj Guru (royal spiritual preceptor).

== As Kaji: 1804–1806 ==
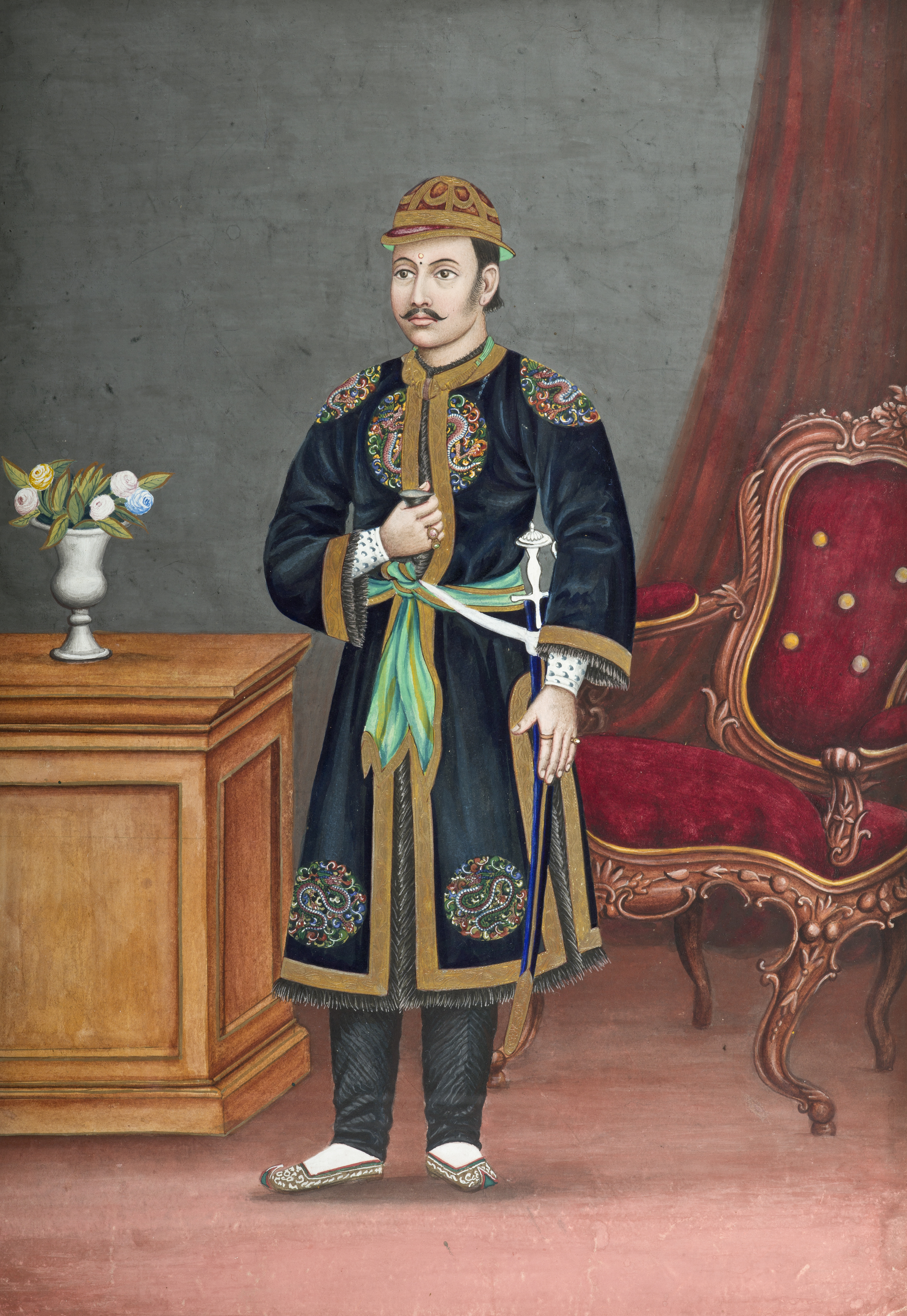
Possible portrait of young Bhimsen

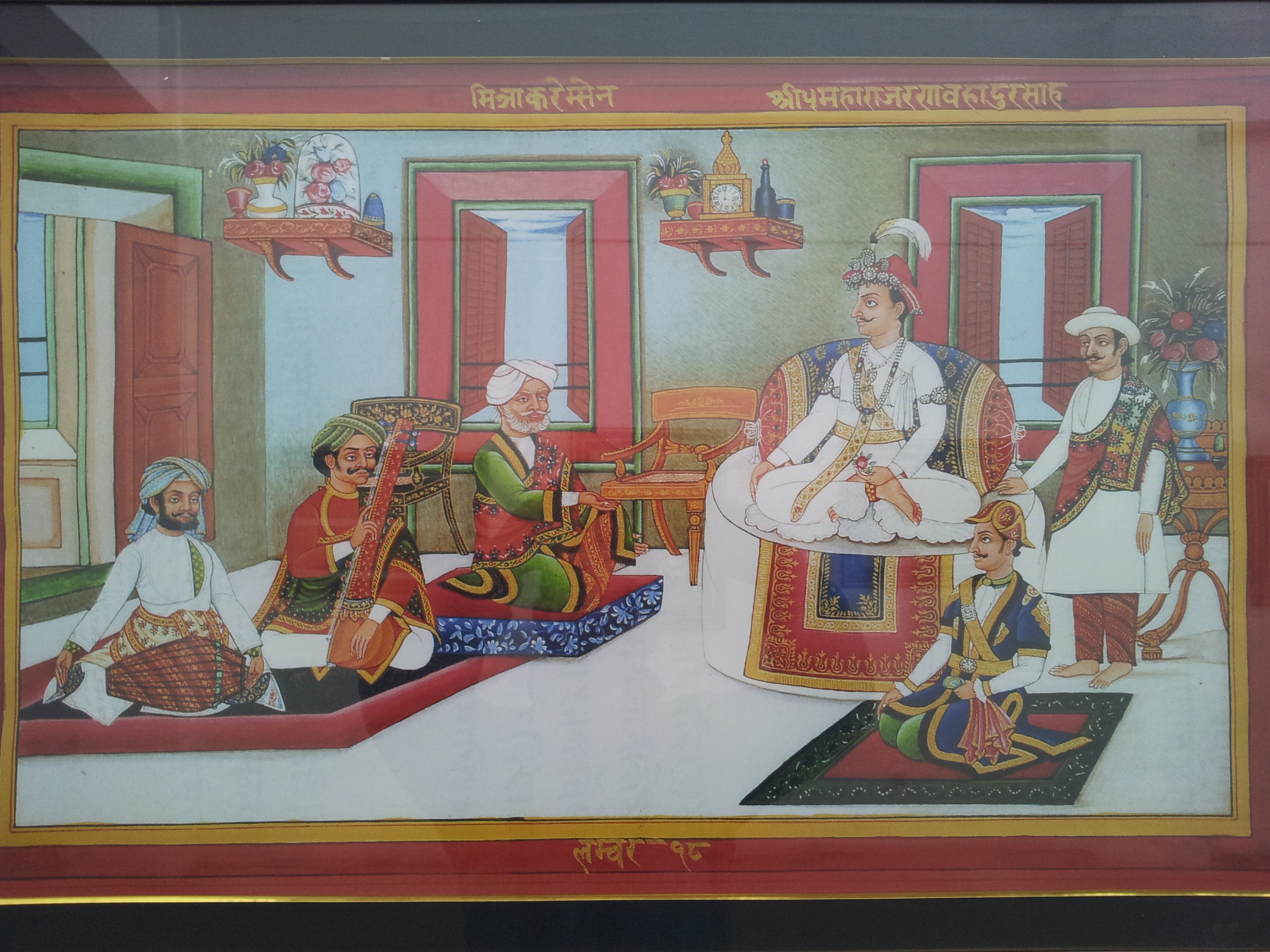
King Rana Bahadur and Bhimsen attending singer Mitra Karim Sen

=== Expansion in the West ===
By the time Bhimsen came to power, the territory of Nepal extended up to the border of Garhwal in the west. During the reign of Bahadur Shah, Nepal had concluded a treaty with Garhwal demanding that it pay NRs. 9,000 per year. Later Rana Bahadur Shah reduced it to NRs. 3,000. However, in 1804, Garhwal refused to pay the amount upon which Bhimsen sent an army under the command of Bada Kaji Amar Singh Thapa (not to be confused with his father), Bhakti Thapa and Hasti Dal Shah to attack Garhwal and in the Battle of Khurbura in May 1804, the huge 12000 Garhwali troops fled the war after their King Pradyumna Shah was shot dead by Kaji Ranajit Kunwar, thus extending the territory of Nepal up to the Sutlej River in the west. As the Nepalese army were preparing for the Kangra campaign in September 1805, military desertion increased; as a result, Bhimsen ordered his brother Nain Singh to arrest such military deserters.

=== Baisathi Haran ===
After the power shuffle, in 1805, Bhimsen became the architect of an unpopular plan of seizing all the tax free land granted to temple guthis and as birta to Brahmin priests in order to fill the empty state coffers. (Note: According to Regmi: Birta meant an assignment of income from the land by the state in favor of individuals, who by virtue of their occupation cannot participate in economic pursuits (such as priests, religious teachers, soldiers, and members of nobility and the royal family) in order to provide them with a livelihood. Birta rights did not include protection from resumption or confiscation by the state. Land granted to guthi system was exempt from such arbitrary government actions. In a guthi system, the land was endowed by the state or birta owners for the establishment or maintenance of such religious or charitable institutions such as temples, monasteries, schools, hospitals, orphanages, and poorhouses. Jagir was an assignment of income from state-owned lands (all the land in the state's domain, also known as raikar) as emoluments of office to government employees and functionaries. Jagir lands assignments were made only for current services, while land granted in appreciation of past services were associated with the birta system. The rights of birta and guthi owners and jagir holders were granted by a royal order which made them lords and masters of the land and the peasant in every sense.) The objective was to scrutinize the cases in which tax-exempt lands had been used without valid documentary proof of land grant by a benefactor; owners with valid evidence or owners who could take an oath of validity were not affected. The money was spent in financing the military campaigns in the far west in Jamuna-Sutlej region. This was a very radical reform in the staunchly religious society of the time and became known as Baisathi Haran in the Nepalese history.

=== Bhandarkhal massacre of 1806 ===
After returning to Kathmandu, in complicity with Rana Bahadur, Bhimsen indulged in appropriating the palaces and properties of deposed members of Shah family, (Note: Bhimsen Thapa blinded three Shah infants (Bir Bhadra Shah, Bhim Pratap Shah, Bhim Rudra Shah) who were heirs to Bagh Durbar, a palace with large garden and compound near Tundikhel, which he appropriated for himself. He also blinded another Shah infant (Kul Chandra Shah), who was an heir to a palace at Indra Chowk, which he gave to Rangnath Paudel. The blinding of Shah infants was done to ensure that King Girvan's status would not be challenged by other Shah contenders for the throne, since according to the custom of that time, a physically disabled person was not allowed to be a king.) which he shared between himself and his supporter Rangnath Paudel. This aroused resentment and jealousy among Sher Bahadur Shah (Rana Bahadur's step-brother) and his faction since they did not receive any portion of this confiscated property, despite their help in reinstating Rana Bahadur to power. (Note: Sher Bahadur Shah had switched his allegiance at the crucial moment which had allowed Damodar Pande to be arrested at Thankot.) They were also wary of Bhimsen's growing power. By this time, Rana Bahadur was a nominal figure and Kaji Bhimsen Thapa was single-handedly controlling the central administration of the country, being able to implement even unpopular reforms like Baisathi Haran.

Bhimsen felt the need to finish off his rivals, but at the same time, felt a need to take precaution before going after immediate members of the royal household. For almost two years after returning to Kathmandu, Rana Bahadur had no official position in the government – he was neither a king, nor a regent, nor a minister – yet he felt no qualms in using the full state power. Not only did Rana Bahadur carry out the Baisathi Haran under Bhimsen's advice, he was also able to banish all non-vaccinated children, as well as their parents, from the town during a smallpox outbreak, in order to prevent King Girvan from catching that disease. Now, after almost two-year, all of a sudden Rana Bahadur was made Mukhtiyar (chief authority) on 26 February 1806 and Bhimsen tried to implement his schemes through Rana Bahadur. Bhimsen had also secretly learned of a plot to oust Rana Bahadur. Tribhuvan Khawas (Pradhan), a member of Sher Bahadur's faction, was imprisoned on the re-opened charges of conspiracy with the British that led to the Knox's mission, but for which pardon had already been doled out, and was ordered to be executed. Tribhuvan Khawas decided to reveal everyone that was involved in the dialogue with the British. Among those implicated was Sher Bahadur Shah.

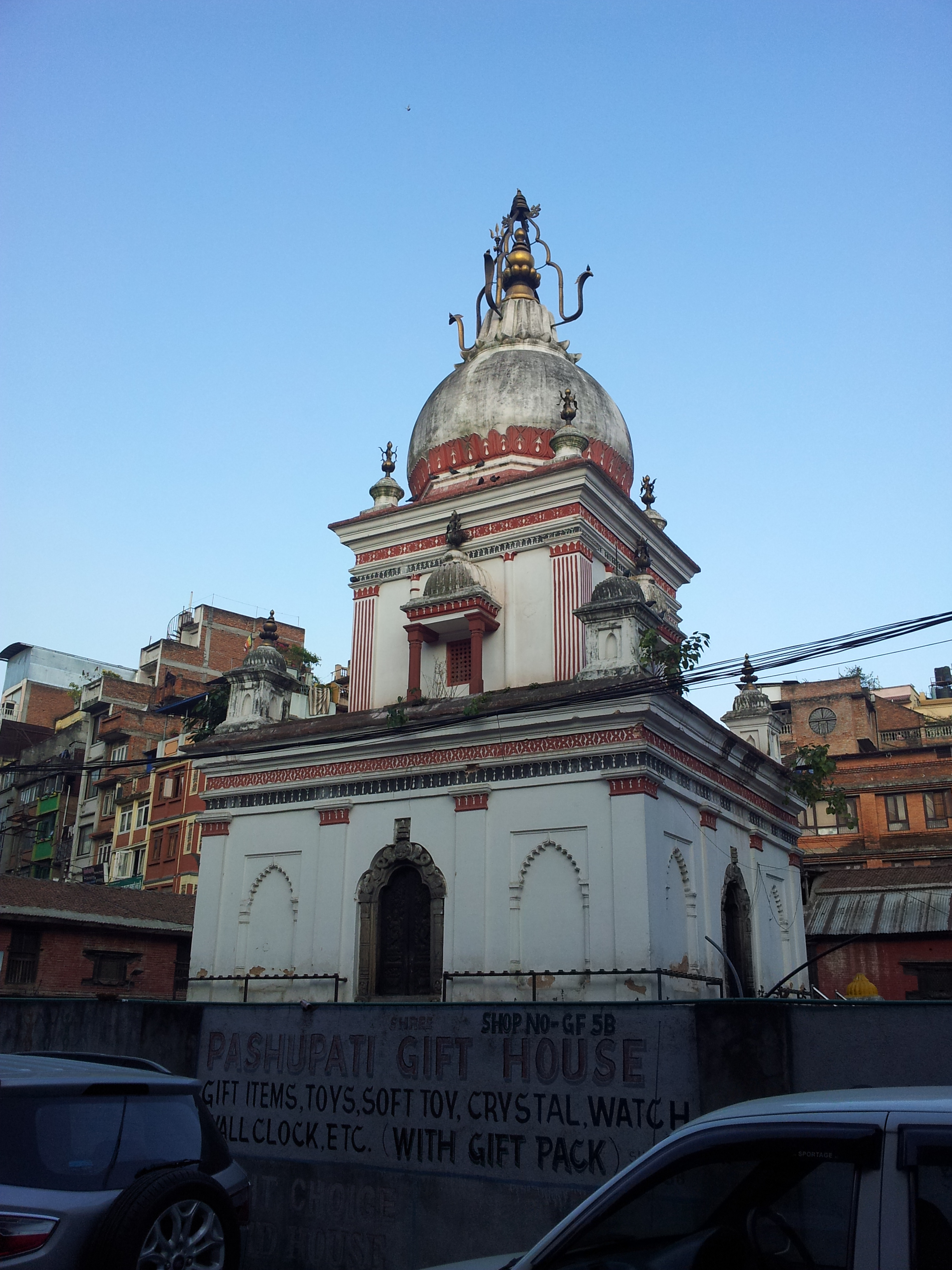
Rana Mukteshwar Temple built by Bhimsen on the deathspot of Rana Bahadur Shah.

On the night of 25 April 1806, Rana Bahadur held a meeting at Tribhuvan Khawas's house with rest of the courtiers, during which he taunted and threatened to execute Sher Bahadur. At around 10 pm, Sher Bahadur in desperation drew a sword and killed Rana Bahadur Shah before being cut down by nearby courtiers, Bam Shah and Bal Narsingh Kunwar, also allies of Bhimsen. The assassination of Rana Bahadur Shah triggered a great massacre in Bhandarkhal (a royal garden east of Kathmandu Durbar) and at the bank of Bishnumati river. That very night members of Sher Bahadur's faction – Bidur Shah, Tribhuvan Khawas, and Narsingh Gurung – and even King Prithvipal Sen of Palpa, who was under house arrest in Patan Durbar, were swiftly rounded up and killed in Bhandarkhal. Their dead bodies were not allowed funeral rites and were dragged and thrown by the banks of Bishnumati to be eaten by vultures and jackals. The next few days, all the sons of Sher Bahadur Shah, Bidur Shah, Tribhuvan Khawas and Narsingh Gurung, aged 2 to 15 were beheaded by the bank of Bishnumati; their wives and daughters were given to the untouchables, their bodyguards and servants were also put to death, and all their property seized. Bhimsen managed to kill everyone who did not agree with him or anyone who could potentially become a problem for him in the future. In this massacre that lasted for about two weeks, a total of ninety-three people (16 women and 77 men) lost their lives.

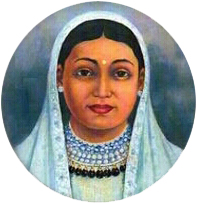
Portrait of Queen Tripurasundari of Nepal

Almost one and half months before the massacre, upon Bhimsen's insistence, Rana Bahadur, then 31 years old, had married a 14-year-old girl named Tripurasundari on 7 March 1806, making her his fifth legitimate wife. (Note: While it is generally believed that Tripurasundari was from a Thapa family, Baburam Acharya further conjectured that Tripurasundari was possibly the daughter of Bhimsen's brother Nain Singh Thapa.) Taking advantage of the political chaos, Bhimsen became the Mukhtiyar (1806–37), and Tripurasundari was given the title Lalita Tripurasundari and declared regent and Queen Mother (1806–32) of Girvan Yuddha Bikram Shah, who was himself 9 years old. Thus, Bhimsen became the first person outside the royal household to hold the position of the Mukhtiyar. All the other wives (except Subarnaprabha) and concubines of Rana Bahadur, along with their handmaidens, were forced to commit sati. Bhimsen obtained a royal mandate from Tripurasundari, given in the name of King Girvan, commanding all other courtiers to be obedient to him. Bhimsen further consolidated his power by disenfranchising the old courtiers from the central power by placing them as administrators of far-flung provinces of the country. The courtiers were instead replaced by his close relatives, who were mere yes-men. On the spot where Rana Bahadur Shah drew his last breath, Bhimsen later built a commemorative Shiva temple by the name Rana-Mukteshwar.

== As Mukhtiyar (Premiership): 1806–1832 ==
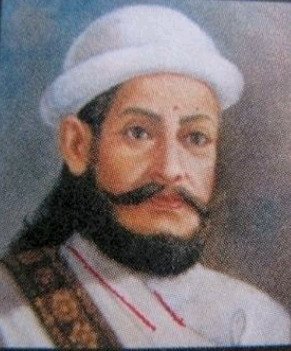
Portrait of General Kaji Amar Singh Thapa The Elder, chief military commander of all Western divisions

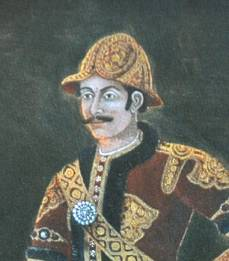
Portrait of Bhimsen Thapa in military uniform.

=== Expansion in the West (Continued) ===
Bhimsen previously ordered the conquest of the Garhwal Kingdom and the preparations of the Kangra campaign. Gorkhali forces under Badakaji Amar Singh, Rudrabir Shah and Nain Singh overran Nalagarh, crossed the Sutlej river and defeated King Sansar Chand of Kangra at Mahal Mori in May 1806. Unfortunately, Bhimsen lost his brother Nain Singh who was shot dead at the conquest of the Kangra fort in the winter of 1806–07. Afterwards in 1807, it was put under Nepalese siege and by early 1809, most of the land of Kangra jagir had been incorporated into Nepal, although the fort was still held out. Sansar Chand took refuge among the Sikhs of Punjab and by August 1809, the Nepalese army was forced to retreat back by the combined army of Sansar Chand and Ranjit Singh, the ruler of Punjab. Other states like Salyan were also annexed to Nepal during his rule. Before the Anglo-Nepalese War, the territory of Nepal extended from Sutlej river in the west to Teesta river in the east. Most of this territory, however, was lost in the Anglo-Nepalese War. In 1811, Bhimsen was given the title of General, thus enjoying a dual position of Mukhtiyar and General.

=== Anglo-Nepalese War: 1814–1816 ===
The Anglo–Nepalese War (1814–1816), sometimes called the Gorkha War, was fought between Nepal and the British Empire owned East India Company as a result of border tensions, trade dispute, and ambitious expansionism of both the belligerent parties. The hostility between the two parties had been brewing for more than a decade since the failure of Knox's mission. Bhimsen had installed his own father Amar Singh Thapa as the governor of Palpa, leading to a serious border disputes with the British East India Company. The border dispute with the British on the frontier of Butwal, Terai, was the immediate reason which led to the Anglo-Nepalese War in 1814. The British had been striving to annex the hill regions of Nepal and at the border demarcation, the British representative Major Bradshaw disrespected the Nepalese representatives – Rajguru Ranganath Poudyal and Kaji Dalabhanjan Pande, with a view of invoking a war against the Nepalese. This war was the most important event during the Mukhtiyari (Mukhtiyarship) of Bhimsen Thapa since it affected every aspect of the later course of Nepalese history. Considering the many successes that the Nepalese army had seen during the expansion campaign of Nepal, Bhimsen Thapa on the Nepalese side was one of the main proponents of the war with the British, which was against the better advice of the likes of Bada Kaji Amar Singh Thapa, who actually did the fighting and knew about the hardships of war. Among those high ranked ministers and commanders who supported the war was Kaji Dalabhanjan, while among those who opposed the war was Kaji Amar Singh (Bada), Rajguru Ranga Nath, Kaji Ranadhoj Thapa, Chautaria Bam Shah and Chautaria Hastidal Shah. Bhimsen's attitude before the war is summarized in the following reply to King Girvan which depicts his strong belief on the Nepalese strategic military advantage:

Through the influence of your good fortune, and that of your ancestors, no one has yet been able to cope with the state of Nipal. The Chinese once made war upon us, but were reduced to seek peace. How then will the English be able to penetrate into the hills? Under your auspices, we shall by our own exertions be able to oppose to them a force of fifty-two lakhs of men, with which we will expel them. The small fort of Bhurtpoor was the work of man, yet the English being worsted before it, desisted from the attempt to conquer it; our hills and fastnesses are formed by the hand of God, and are impregnable. I therefore recommend the prosecution of hostilities. We can make peace afterwards on such terms as may suit our convenience.

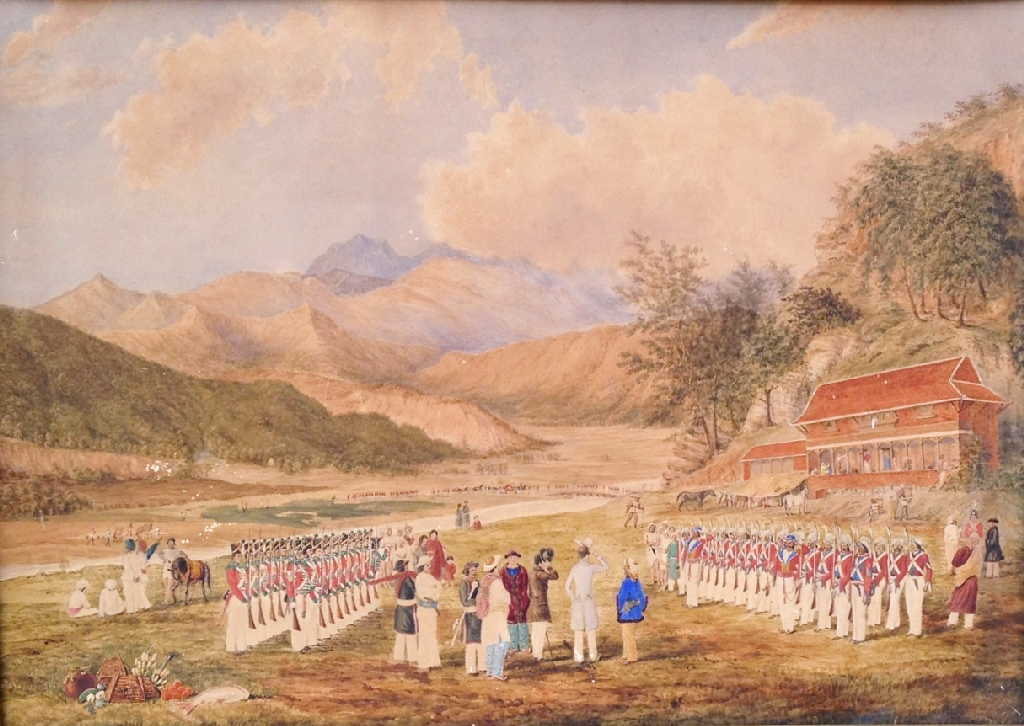
Bhimsen Thapa's Gorkha troops, right, at Segauli, 1816, with India Pattern Brown Bess muskets and chupi bayonets

Kaji Ranadhoj Thapa also agreed with Bhimsen's reply regarding the Nepalese strategic military advantage over British in the hills but counterargued that the expelled hill Rajas will unite against the Gorkha Empire and disclose the confidentiality of the hills to the British. Similarly, Kaji Amar Singh (Bada) also opined that hill Rajas will defect to the British side. Based on intelligence reports, Bhimsen predicted that the first point of British attack would be the Doon area, which later proved to be correct. The British launched two successive waves of invasion campaigns. The Nepalese army was commanded largely by the members and relatives of the larger Thapa caucus that includes the Thapa dynasty and Family of Amar Singh Thapa. (Note: Bhimsen's nephew Ujir Singh Thapa commanded over the Butwal-Jit Gadhi Axis while his brothers Ranbir Singh Thapa and Bakhtawar Singh Thapa commanded over the Makwanpur-Hariharpur Axis and Bijayapur-Sindhuligadhi Axis respectively. Bada Kaji Amar Singh Thapa who was considered a member of the larger Thapa caucus, led the battle as overall commander against the columns of Major-General Rollo Gillespie and Colonel David Ochterlony; his son Ranjore Thapa commanded the Nahan and Jaithak forts; and Ranjor's nephew Balbhadra Kunwar commanded the Doon region at Nalapani.) During the war, Bhimsen tried to form a coalition with Ranjit Singh of Sikh Empire and Daulat Rao Scindia of Gwalior State and launch a collective war against the British; thus opening multiple geographical frontiers of combat. Both rulers did not wish to see the Nepalese lose; however, they also did not want to commit themselves to the losing side. (Note: Ranjit Singh had maintained a policy of wary friendship with the British, ceding some territory south of the Sutlej River to British and maintained friendly relations with British throughout his life while Daulat Rao Scindia was already subdued by the British East India Company at the Second Anglo-Maratha War and had signed the Treaty of Surji-Anjangaon in 1803.) The war ended with the signing of the Treaty of Sugauli in 1816, which ceded around one-third of Nepal's territory to the British. Furthermore, according to the treaty, Nepal had to agree that accredited Ministers from each shall reside at the Court of the other to secure and improve the relations of amity and peace between the two States. During the war, Bhimsen Thapa served as the Commander-in-Chief of the Nepalese army; and thus he had to bear the direct responsibility of Nepalese defeat.

=== Hold on power ===
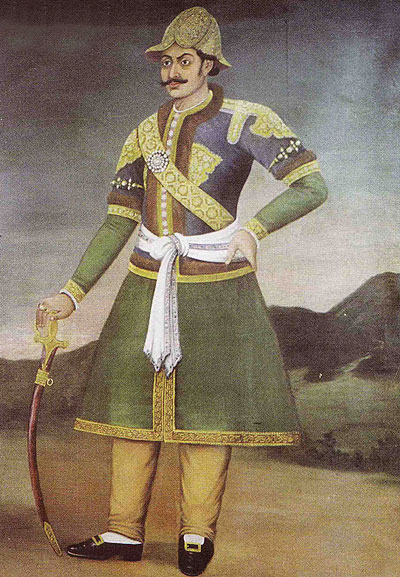
Bhimsen Thapa, the Prime Minister of Nepal from 1806 to 1837

In May 1816, Edward Gardner arrived in Kathmandu as the first British Resident after the conclusion of the Treaty of Sugauli. Bhimsen used all his influence to cultivate peace, although not friendliness, with the British, "a Power," as he said, "that crushed thrones like potsherds." His foreign policy after the war was essentially the one handed down by Prithvi Narayan Shah – to keep Nepal isolated from any foreign influences. As such, although he was forced to accept a British resident in Kathmandu as per the Treaty of Sugauli, he made sure to cut off the resident from all contacts with life in Nepal to the point of making the Resident a virtual prisoner. Apart from petty harassment, the Resident was only allowed to travel within the Kathmandu valley, that too only with special escorts. The resident was also barred from meeting the king or any courtiers at will. Thus the threat of having a Resident in Kathmandu was not as keen as had been anticipated. Later British Resident Hodgson also remarked how the British couldn't capitalize the 1816 war victory over Nepal where he opined that the British should have either "crippled them [Nepal] effectually" or force Nepal in "giving surplus soldiery employment" to the British armies.

On 20 November 1816, King Girvan Yuddha died of smallpox, aged nineteen. Girvan had two wives – the first wife committed sati with Girvan, while the second wife also died of smallpox after 14 days of Girvan's death. Thus, Girvan was succeeded by his only son, Rajendra Bikram Shah, an infant of two years old, after 18 days of his father's death on 8 December 1816. Therefore, Bhimsen Thapa, in collusion with the queen regent, Tripurasundari, remained in power despite the defeat of Nepal in the Anglo-Nepalese War of 1814–16. There was a sustained opposition against Bhimsen from factions centered around leading members of other aristocratic families, notably the Pandes, (Note: After the execution of Damodar Pande, some of his sons had managed to escape to India. During the Anglo-Nepalese War, Rana Jang Pande had informed Ranabir Singh Thapa that the British would be off guard during Christmas. Following this advice, Ranbir Singh was able to obtain a major victory during a battle in Parsa. This won the Pandes the trust of Ranbir Singh, which eventually led to their pardon by King Girvan and subsequent return to Nepal. Bhimsen himself called back his arch rivals Karbir Pande and Rana Jang Pande from Terai and reinstated them to some governmental offices.) who denounced what they felt was his cowardly submission to the British. Paradoxically, the peacetime after the Anglo-Nepalese War saw the inflation and modernization of the Nepal army, which Bhimsen used to keep his opposition under control, while at the same time convincing the suspicious British that he had no intention of using it against them. Bhimsen appointed his own family members and his most trusted men to the highest positions at the court and in the army, while members of older aristocratic families were made administrators of far-flung provinces of the kingdom, away from the capital.

Thus, Bhimsen was able to continue making all the administrative decisions of the country, while the Regent Queen Tripurasundari would unquestioningly approve these decisions by stamping the royal seal issued in the name of King Rajendra on these government orders. The Regent never dared to express any doubts regarding Bhimsen's decisions. Nevertheless, to make sure that the King, his wives – Samrajya Laxmi Devi (senior) and Rajya Lakshmi Devi (junior) – and the Regent were insulated from influences of people other than Bhimsen and his closest relatives, Bhimsen had instated his youngest brother, Ranvir Singh Thapa, in the royal palace to keep a watch on the royal family and to keep guard against any outside person. Any priest or courtier who wished to be granted an interview with the King, the Queens, or the Regent, had to get approval from Ranbir Singh and the interview had to be conducted under his watchful presence. Similarly, the royal family was not allowed to leave the palace without Bhimsen's permission either. Bhimsen had also neglected the formal education of Rajendra, due to which he had grown to be uncritical and weak minded to the extent that he was even unaware that he was virtually a prisoner. However, his wives were more alert and wary of Bhimsen since, according to Baburam Acharya, they received unfiltered news of the world outside the royal palace from their handmaidens, who would leave the palace compounds and go to their homes during their menstruation and gather news and rumors of the day, which they would then relate to the Queens.

=== Tussles with Samar Jung Company ===
After the Bhandarkhal Massacre of 1806, Bhimsen was put in charge of the Samar Jung Company, which was established in 1796 as the royal palace guard unit and camped inside the palace compound itself, whose command was later handed over to his brother Bakhtawar Singh This position allowed Bakhtawar to gain the confidence of both King Girvan and the Regent Queen Tripurasundari. After the end of the Anglo-Nepalese War, Bakhtawar was suspected by Bhimsen of playing anti-Mukhtiyar politics and of joining the opposing court factions. At the time, Bakhtawar was living in joint family with his brother, without the division of their ancestral property. After the conclusion of a treaty with the British to hand over some of the annexed land in Tarai back to Nepal, Bhimsen turned his attention to address Bakhtawar Singh's influence over the royalty. However, their mother pleaded only a light punishment for Bakhtawar. Thus, he was dismissed from his position and imprisoned in Nuwakot. This move was highly unpopular among the personnel of the Samar Jung Company. As such, Bhimsen had the Samar Jung Company removed from its position of royal palace guard. Some of the officers and soldiers of the Samar Jung Company were imprisoned, while the remaining personnel were assigned guard duties in common jails as well as monitoring of road construction by convicts. As a further punishment, the Mukhtiyar cancelled their holidays on Saturday, whereas all other companies enjoyed such benefit. Their Devata flag carried by Nishan flag-bearers were also treated with indignity.

=== Policies and reforms ===
British Historian Henry Ambrose Oldfield contended that Bhimsen strengthened Nepal back to the pre-British war position through the adoption of militarization, financial and economic policies.

Bhimsen who was possessed of great perseverance as well as determination, devoted almost exclusively all his time and talents to the services of the State. During the minority of King, he raised Nipal [Nepal], although deprived of nearly one-third of her dominions, to nearly as strong a military position on our frontier as she had occupied before the war. He nearly doubled her internal resources by careful attention to the state of her finances, and by judicious re-adjustment of the national taxes.

— Historian Oldfield summarizing Bhimsen's post war recovery policies and strategies

==== Defence policy ====
===== Militarization =====
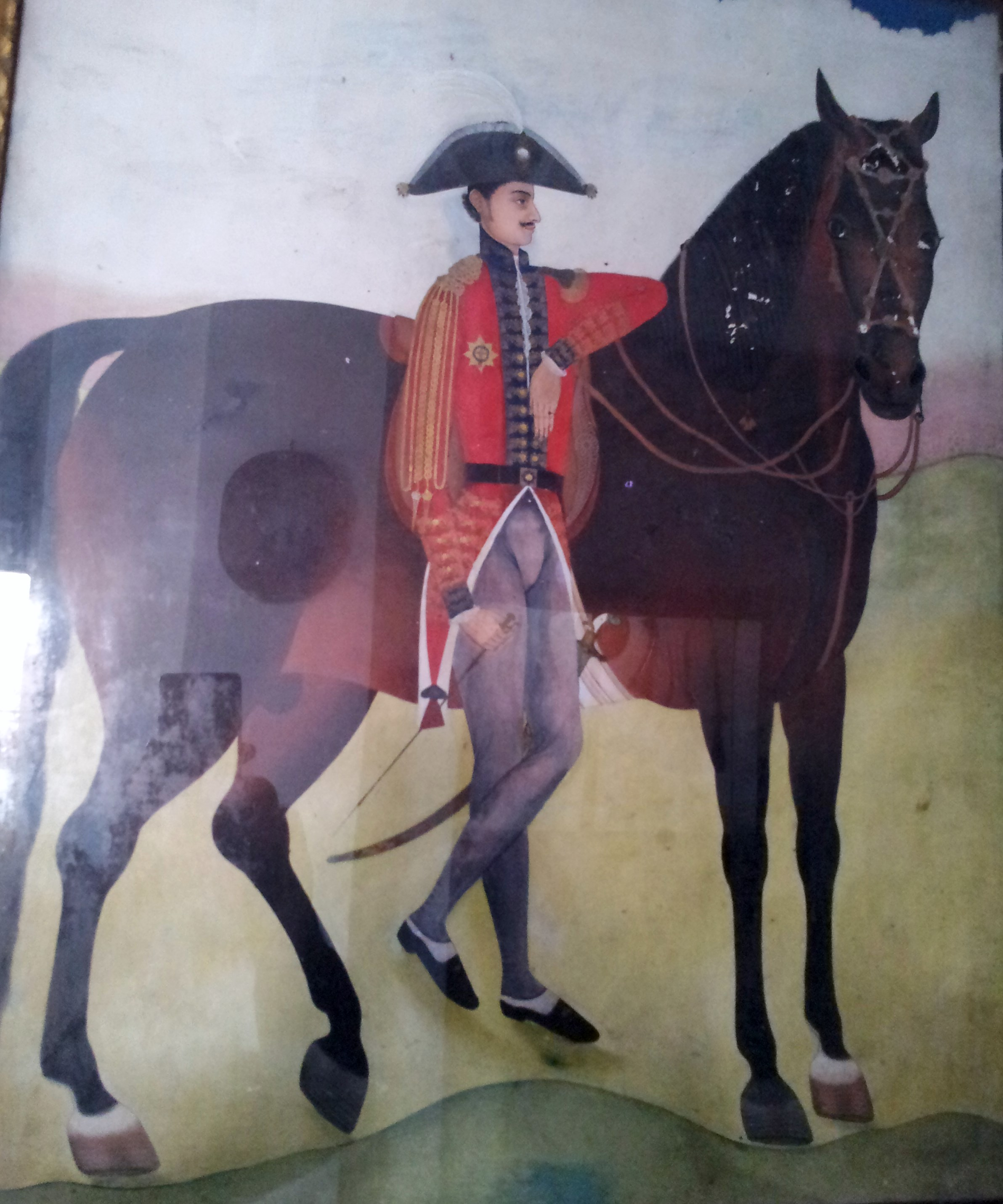
Picture of Bhimsen Thapa standing beside a horse in the reformed Nepalese military uniforms designed from French military uniform

Bhimsen implemented the reorganization of Nepalese Army on the basis of European military system and the maintenance of the newly reorganized strong army was done from the confiscation of Birta funds of 1805. He appointed French military officials to modernize the military on the basis of French military ranks and uniforms. Military jobs were made attractive by increasing facilities including Jhara (porter) facility even in the peacetime under his Mukhtiyari. Due to extensive lack of labour forces in the country, he issued legal obligations to all adult males of all castes to provide compulsory labour to the state subject to royal exemptions. Those state jobs included construction and maintenance of forts, bridges, roads, and production of ammunition for military expeditions.

Bhim Sen took advantage of the continuance of peace, not only to improve the finances of the country, but to render the army more efficient both in numbers and in discipline. The martial feelings of soldiery were every way encouraged; their rights and privileges were jealously preserved; but they were at the same time kept from that idleness which is so favourable to mutiny and intrigue, by strict attention to drill and discipline and by being employed in the construction of magazines, arsenals, cannon, foundry, &c., and by the establishment of two large cantonments-one for the artillery and one for the line-at Kathmandu.

— Historian Henry Ambrose Oldfield on Bhimsen's reorganization of military

===== Passport policy =====
Bhimsen considered Churia hills as the basic line of defense of the Kingdom of Nepal. He thus wanted to build communications to the western parts such as Kumaon, Garhwal and Yamuna-Sutlej region of Kingdom of Nepal and block the strategic routes to the Kathmandu Valley. The possessions of passers-by were strictly searched and even private letters were censored. Such was implemented to prevent outflow of secret information of Nepal to British Company government. Passport system was introduced to check the access to the capital city with officials appointed on the Churai routes with instructions as follows:

In case you permit any person, irrespective of his status, leaving this side to proceed onward even though he does not have (a document bearing) signature of passports authority. We shall behead you.

==== Trade and economic policies ====
The trade policy of Bhimsen Thapa was influenced from King Prithvi Narayan Shah who believed foreign (in the context English) traders would weaken the economy of the country and impoverish the general people. Customs offices were relocated within the country to reduce discomfort to native traders. Essential arrangements and facilities were provided to native traders and officials were warned not to intimidate native traders. Bhimsen is quoted to have said:

If Tibetans and Firangis [i.e. foreigners or, in the contemporary context, Englishmen] meet and trade with each other, our ryots and traders will lose their employment and result will not be good.

He brought forth the increment of custom duties leading to higher state revenue generation from eighty thousand rupees in 1816 to two and half lakh rupees (NPR 250,000) in 1833. After 1807, markets were opened in the Terai and Inner Terai under direct governmental efforts and supervision to facilitate native traders. For instances; in 1809, market towns were made at Hitaruwa in Makawanpur and at Bhadaruwa in Saptari. Indian traders were also encouraged to trade within the country and Nepalese officials were instructed to take care of the development of border markets, land reclamation and settlement, and protection of land encroachment. In 1811, timber exports from Chitwan to Calcutta were introduced together with the diversification of agricultural products to strengthen the export. Also, mining and minting coins were undertaken by the Bhimsen government.

==== Judicial reforms ====
Bhimsen put forth the principle of Equality before the law in Nepal. In 1826, a regulation was issued by him through Lalmohar (Red Seal) of Maharaja directing Kaji Dalbhanjan Pande to maintain the sanctity of judiciary and it further stated:

irrespective of castes, creeds or position in the society, all are same in the eyes of law.

Mohi (tenant farmers) felt it easier to pay taxes in kind to their Zamindars due to cash shortage. He directed the Zamindars to accept foodgrain as tax and not to harass the farmers. The regulation further directed that it was the responsibility of Zamindars to make arrangements for cash and not of the farmers. The anti-bribery regulations were issued due to reports of Zamindars, Amalis, and regional officials taking up bribery from people in the far-flung provinces. Bhimsen through his regulations declared it illegal to give or take any form of bribes or gifts from people. Merchants at Ridi in 1829 and Tansen in 1830 lost their thatched shopping houses to fire. The affected merchants demanded individual rights on property and allowance of building concrete shopping houses. He accepted the merchants' proposal of building concrete shopping houses and allowed individual rights on the property. Due to long ongoing unification campaigns of Nepal, there was anarchy in Nepalese administration before Bhimsen's Mukhtiyari. In Achham Province, Zamindars, Amalis, and traders perpetrated great injustice to farmers by increasing heavy interest on loans, to which farmers revolted. Bhimsen being moved by the plight of the victims issued Lalmohar with binding instructions to write off outstanding dues at once.

==== Slavery reforms ====
In 1807 dealing with slavery, the government of Bhimsen directed revenue officials to collect outstanding taxes and fines in terms of cash and ordered the freedom of all enslaved farmers in case of defaulting taxes and no farmer would be enslaved for non-payment of taxes. In 1812, he imposed a general restriction on human trafficking in Garhwal Sirmur and other areas. The children of debtors were acquired by the traders against the accumulated interest of the loans and were sold on profit. The feudal lords did not allow them legal facilities and considered slaves as non-human. Bhimsen challenged the widespread notion of inhuman treatment of slaves. In 1830, Bhimsen having introduced anti-slavery regulations beforehand in 1807, restricted all of the Danuwar traders in Western Nepal to acquire and sell Kariya slaves and also freed slaves from the custody of their owner. The regulation was targeted to provide legal rights to slaves and boost their morale. Six years afterward, he restricted ban on sales of children prevalent among Magar community of Marsyangdi and Western Pyuthan. The slave trading was made illegal on various parts of Nepal by Bhimsen. It was considered one of the greatest achievement in the history on comparison to their British counterparts. Wilberforce in England was obtaining the public mandate against it while one of the most powerful Prime Minister in the world (in the 1800s) – William Pitt was hesitant to outlaw the slave trading.

==== Socio-religious reforms ====
The socio-religious customs like birth and death ceremonies among Newar community was leading to indebtedness. The priests took up huge ceremonial fees and failure to adhere to such customs led people to excommunication in the Newar society. In 1830–31, Bhimsen by issuing Lalmohar, a regulation was introduced with a limit of ceremonial fees and the amount of expenditure was restricted.

==== Land management reforms ====
Around 1808, Bhimsen ordered the reclamation of wastelands in Terai region for increasing state revenue and offered irrigation facilities to settlers reclaiming the wastelands. In places where there was a lack of tenants, farmers were allocated the wastelands with tax exemption and loan was provided for new incoming settlers. The wastelands reclamation policy was largely advantageous to the government and tenants, and was greatly successful in Eastern Terai. For the coordination of this policy, officials were appointed all over the state in 1811.

==== Postal reforms ====
Hulaki (postal) system from Kathmandu to the western front was implemented in 1804 through rotational relays of porters. In 1808 during the premiership of Bhimsen, it was reported that minors were engaged in Hulaki services in the villages with small Hulaki households. The regulation issued by Bhimsen's government was to increase the number of relays in the villages consisting low Hulaki households and person forcing minors and females for personal Hulaki services would be severely punished. These Jhara (porter) services for Hulaki system were regularly required due to which some were compensated with land under Adhiya (half-ownership) tenure and others in the form of cash wages compensation. Regulations issued in July 1809 was:

In the areas west of Dharmasthali (in Kathmandu) and east of Bheri River, inspect whether or not Hulaki outposts for transport or mail have been established as mentioned in the previous order. According to this order, Hulaki porters had been granted a 50 percent concession in the Walak levies, in addition to full exemption from (other) compulsory labour obligations and taxes on their homesteads...
In areas west of Bheri river and east of Jamuna river, make an estimate of the amount required for payment to Hulaki porters employed for the transport of mail on the basis of sum sanctioned in the previous order and the sum required according to arrangements made this year for different areas and submit a report accordingly.

==== Foreign policy ====
Bhim Sen was the first Nepalese statesman who grasped the meaning of the system of Protectorates which Lord Wellesley had carried out in India. He saw one Native State after another come within the net of British subsidiary alliances, and his policy was steadily directed to save Nepal from a similar fate.

— Historian William Wilson Hunter on Bhimsen's comprehension of British colonial policies

Bhimsen was widely known to have resorted to a negative political stance against the British imperialism throughout his life. He was an advocate of "Asian Unity" against the British Imperialism. He issued restrictions on the British Resident refraining him to interfere on the national politics and national administration, and prohibited the Resident maintaining any secret relationship with Nepalese citizens. He worked to reduce the British Resident to a mere ambassador of a friendly state. He viewed the British Residents as disturbances in the local administration, who would encourage factional fightings with a motive to colonize such factional chaos ridden states. He also had fully realized the main motive of the system of protectorates adopted by the East India Company Government. In this context, German philosopher and historian Karl Marx quoted that

Bhimsen was the only man in Asia who braved to protest submission to colonists.

British historian William Hunter also remarked about his comprehension of British system of protectorate. Historian Nayaraj Panta considered that Bhimsen's action to suppress British influences on Nepal and strengthening of Nepalese military forces was important to save the fate of the only Hindu Kingdom in the world. British Resident Hodgson on his 19 December 1833 report lauded how Bhimsen successfully defied the British colonial powers that succeeded over all of India:

The Feringhis (it is eternally rung into his ear) have seized and conquered all [ India ]: they are the ablest and most designing of men; they have been kept eighteen years from devouring Nepal solely by the unparalleled vigilance and energy of Bhim Sen. All pleasant communications from and with the Residency are studiously thrown into shade. All unpleasant ones, however trivial, are studiously glared upon the eyes of the Raja and of the other chiefs, not a soul among whom nor any attendant of theirs or of the Raja's being suffered to come near the Residency and learn the simple verity. And in this state of things any fiction, however gross, relative to our characters or views may be made to tell more or less with the naturally proud and suspicious Sirdars, and with the hopeless little recluse who occupies the throne.

— Resident of Nepal to Political Secretary to Government of India, dated 19 December 1833

After the 1816 war, Bhimsen had been preventing direct communications between the British Residents and the King, which Resident Brian Houghton Hodgson had reacted negatively. On his report dated 18 February 1833 to Governor General of India, Resident Hodgson wrote:

All these circumstances have combined to render Bhim Sen of late provokingly captious and suspicious towards us; lest, I suppose, the Raja should perchance to be undeceived as to the figments palmed on him relative to our political impracticability and political dishonesty. The [Prime] Minister, in defiance of custom alike and of decency, would now restrict still further the very little direct commerce ever maintained between the Resident and the Maharaja.

— The Resident to the Political Secretary to Government, dated February 18th, 1833

=== Heritages built ===
In 1811, he built the bridge at Thapathali over Bagmati River connecting strategically significant cities; Kathmandu and Patan. In 1825, he built the famous Dharahara Tower on the orders of then reigning Queen Tripurasundari of Nepal. Beforehand, he had already built the taller antecedent of Dharahara for himself in 1824. The taller Dharahara collapsed in the 1833 Nepal earthquake and was never repaired. The smaller Dharahara had 11 storeys before 1934 Nepal earthquake reduced it to two storeys. The original Dharahara Tower built by Bhimsen was 225 feet tall and was completely destroyed in the 2015 Nepal earthquake. It was recognized by UNESCO. Dharahara is considered as majestic and nationalistic legacy of Bhimsen. The feat of completing twin Dharahara towers by Bhimsen in a span of two years was considered a unique architectural achievement.

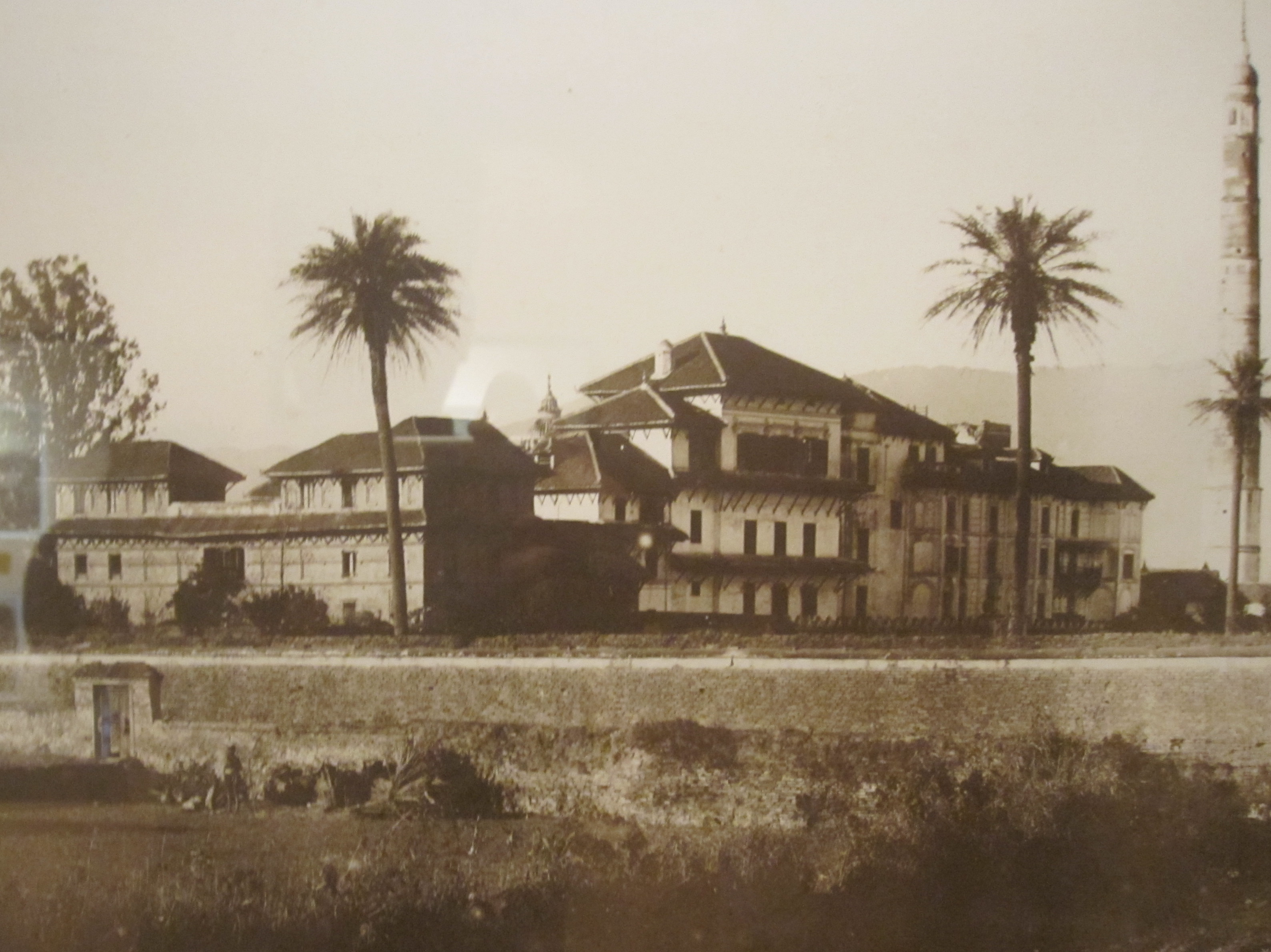
Bag Durbar

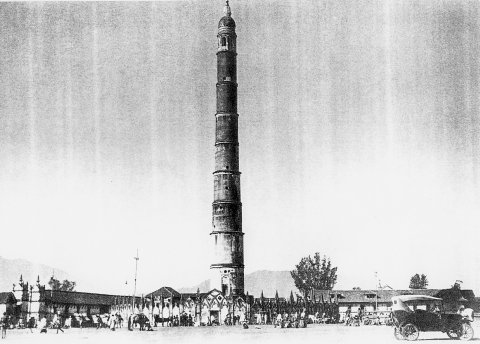
Dharahara (Bhimsen Stambha)

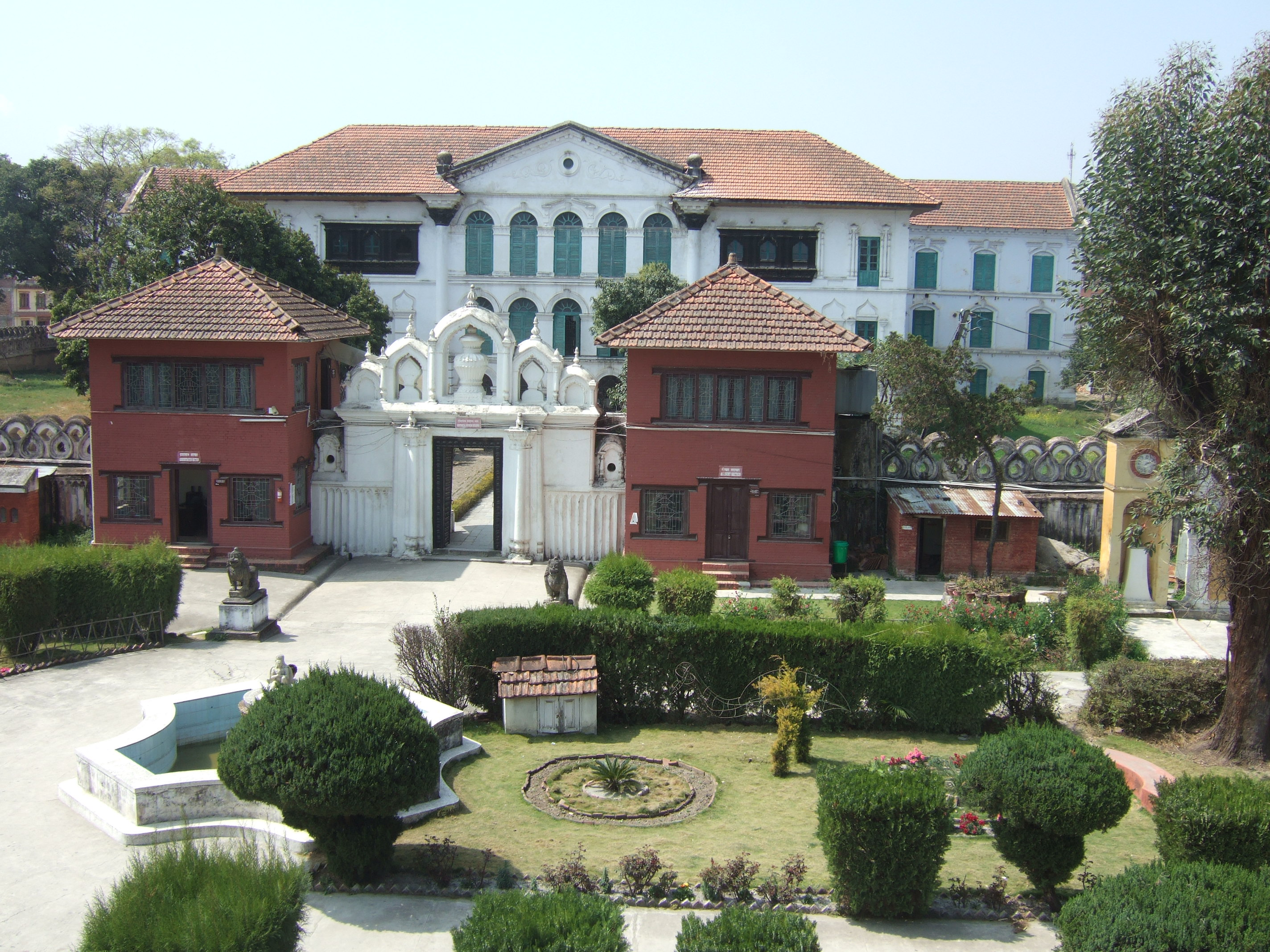
National Museum of Nepal at Chhauni

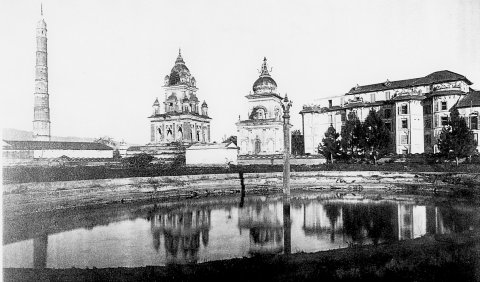
Bhimsen Tower, Ram Chandra Temples and Bag Durbar before 1935

Heritages and Monuments built by Bhimsen Thapa

In 1811, he also constructed Bagh Durbar after being appointed General reside near to Basantapur Palace. He initially moved from Gorkha district to Thapathali Durbar and further to Bagh Durbar. It had a spacious Janarala Bag (General's Garden), pond and many temples glorifying the Mukhtiyar General. Later when Thapa rule was revived again, Mathabar Singh recaptured the lost palace and began to reside for two more years. The National Museum of Nepal at Chhauni was once a residence of Bhimsen. The building has collection of bronze sculptures, paubha paintings and weapons including the sword gifted by the Emperor of the French Napoleon Bonaparte.

== Infighting ==
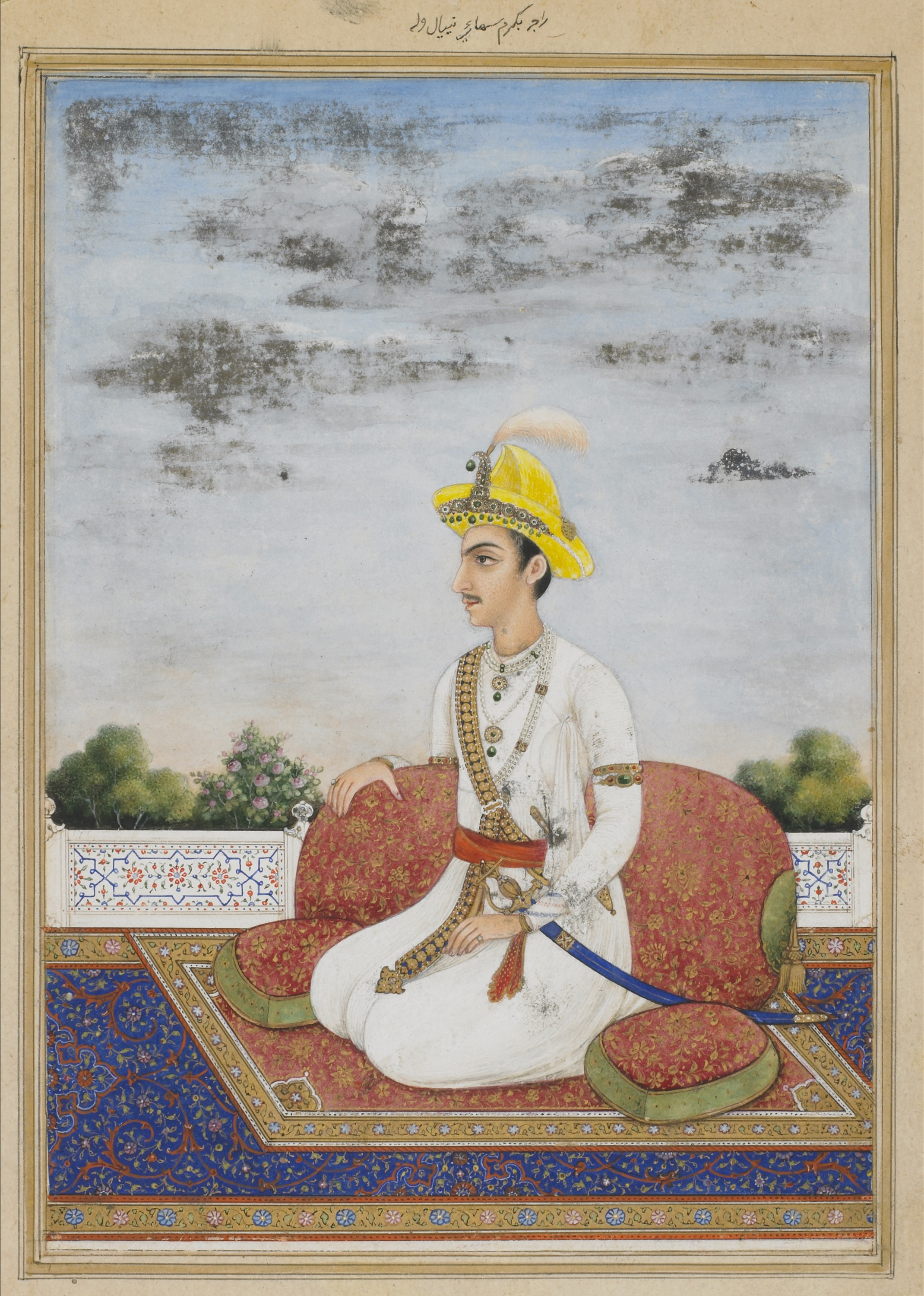
Portrait of Rajendra Bikram Shah.

=== Reasons ===
The Gorkha aristocracy had led Nepal into a disaster on the international front but preserved the political unity of the country, which at the end of the Anglo-Nepalese War in 1816 still was only about twenty-five years old as a unified nation. The success of the central government rested in part on its ability to appoint and control regional administrators, who also were high officers in the army. In theory, these officials had great local powers; in practice they spent little energy on the daily affairs of their subjects, interfering only when communities could not cope with problems or conflicts. Another reason for Gorkha success in uniting the country was the willingness to placate local leaders by preserving areas where former kings and communal assemblies continued to rule under the loose supervision of Kathmandu, leaving substantial parts of the country out of the control of regional administrators. Even within the areas directly administered by the central government, agricultural lands were given away as jagir to the armed services and as birta to court favorites and retired servicemen. The holder of such grants in effect became the lord of the peasants working there, with little if any state interference. From the standpoint of the average cultivator, the government remained a distant force, and the main authority figure was the landlord, who took part of the harvest, or (especially in the Tarai) the tax collector, who was often a private individual contracted to extort money or crops in return for a share. For the leaders in the administration and the army, as military options became limited and alternative sources of employment grew very slowly, career advancement depended less on attention to local conditions than on loyalty to factions fighting at court.

=== Actors ===
Five leading families or factions contended for power during this period—the Shahs, Thapas, Basnyats, Pandes, and the Chautariyas, who were of Shah dynasty but acted as counselors for the King. Working for these families and their factions were hill Brahmans, who acted as religious preceptors or astrologers, and Newars, who occupied secondary administrative positions. No one else in the country had any influence on the central government. When a family or faction achieved power, it killed, exiled, or demoted members of opposing alliances. Under these circumstances, there was little opportunity for either public political life or coordinated economic development.

=== Consequences ===
The struggle for power at the court had unfortunate consequences for both foreign affairs and for internal administration. All parties tried to satisfy the army in order to avoid interference in court affairs by leading commanders, and the military was given a free hand to pursue ever-larger conquests. As long as the Gorkhas were invading disunited hill states, this policy—or lack of policy—was adequate. Inevitably, continued aggression led Nepal into disastrous collisions with the Chinese and then with the British. At home, because power struggles centered on control of the king, there was little progress in sorting out procedures for sharing power or expanding representative institutions. A consultative body of nobles, a royal court called the Assembly of Lords (Bharadari Sabha), was in place after 1770 and it had substantial involvement in major policy issues. The assembly consisted of high government officials and leading courtiers, all heads of important Gorkha families. In the intense atmosphere surrounding the monarch, however, the Assembly of Lords broke into factions that fought for access to the prime minister or regent, and alliances developed around patron/client relationships.

== Downfall: 1832–1838 ==
=== Death of Queen Tripurasundari and family intrigues ===
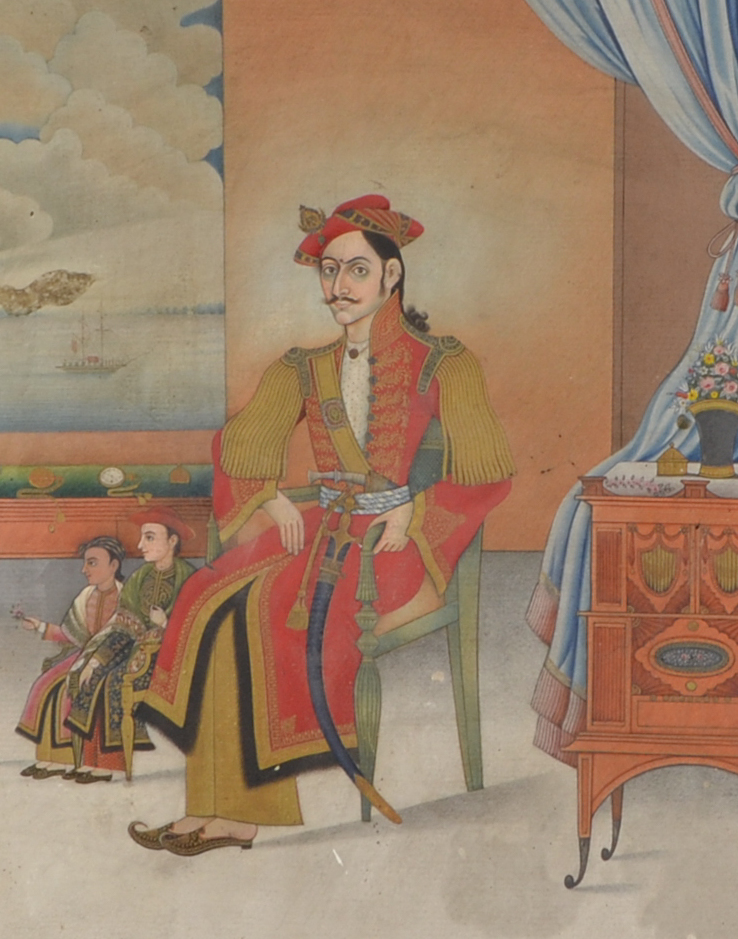
Portrait of younger brother Ranabir Singh Thapa

The power balance began to change after King Rajendra came of age and his grandmother, Tripurasundari, died on 26 March 1832 due to cholera. Bhimsen lost his main support and the court became a stage for a power struggle, which even though started off as an attempt to assert the King's authority from the Mukhtiyar, spread to various aristocratic clans and their attempt to secure total authority. King Rajendra was frivolous and mostly indulged in pleasure, so, he still feared the Mukhtiyar and the Thapa faction as "...a race of men who for the last fifty-five years have dragged the country and its princes at the wheels of military car." It was no secret that Bhimsen was able to maintain his supremacy due to the large standing army under his and his family's command; and in the subsequent years, different factions would attempt to increase their influence based on the strength of the number of battalions under their grip. After Tripurasundari's death, the royal seal by which government orders were approved naturally went into the hands of the senior queen Samrajya Laxmi, who knew all too well of its powers and wanted to emulate the queens of the past by establishing her own regency. In 1833, Bhimsen established a new battalion "Singha Nath" under the command of his nephew Mathabar Singh.

...Her death has relieved Runbeer Singh of the restraint which her authority imposed upon him, and as he is constantly about the person of the Rajah he naturally looks forward to an increase of his own influence at the expend of his brother's...

— Secretary to the Governor General of India, T.H. Maddock, on aspirations of Ranbir Singh

Sensing Samrajya Laxmi's ambition, Ranbir Singh started to stroke her dislike of Bhimsen in the hopes of becoming the Mukhtiyar himself. Mathabar Singh, who had enjoyed an ardent support from the military, strongly supported Bhimsen to check Ranbir Singh's aspirations. A quarrel occurred between Mathabar Singh and Ranbir Singh regarding the latter's shift of loyalty towards the Senior Queen Samrajya Lakshmi, resulting in Mathabar Singh resigning from the command of Sri Nath Regiment Historian Hunter remarked that Mathabar Singh resigned from two battalions after getting moderations from Ranbir Singh in 1834, to which all the soldiers of both battalions except 200 troops, "laid down their arms" in protest and declined to serve under any other officers; the frightened King harmonized the situation by appointing Mathabar Singh as General Commander of the Eastern districts with 3000 troops under his command in November 1834. Getting a whiff of Ranbir Singh's ambitions, Bhimsen strongly reprimanded Ranbir Singh which caused him to resign from his position and live in retirement in his house at Sipamandan. However, Bhimsen later managed to placate his brother, by giving him the title of Chota (Little) General, and send him to Palpa as its governor. To counter the opposition arising in Darbar after the incident, he appointed young Kaji Surath Singh Thapa, a grandson of Bada Kaji Amar Singh Thapa to a very high administrative position in the Darbar and made him joint chief signatory. Since he could find nobody that he could trust to keep watch over the royal palace, Bhimsen from then on started to live in an ordinary rented house located near the palace premise.

=== Moderation by royals ===
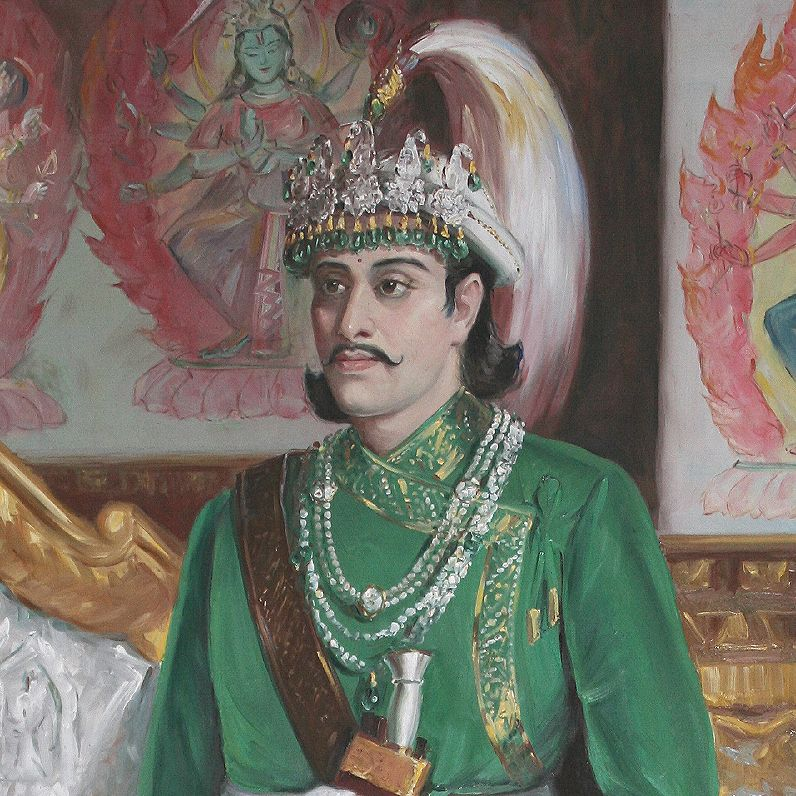
Portrait of King Rajendra Bikram Shah.

The King and the Queens also started to openly challenge Bhimsen's authority. By this time, Rajendra and his wives had heard the widespread rumor that Bhimsen, in order to remain in power, had killed the late King Girvan and his wives by administering poison a few days after Girvan's coming off age. So when Rajendra was afflicted by an ordinary illness, the Queens cautioned the King and prohibited him to take the medicine offered by the royal physician, Sardar Ekdev Upadhyay, who was loyal to Bhimsen. Similarly, during the annual muster of 1833, during which the civil and military officers were promoted, renewed, retained, or retired, everything was conducted according to Bhimsen's plan, but Rajendra delayed the retainment of Bhimsen's own position as the Mukhtiyar.

This forced Bhimsen to share the administrative burden between Rajendra, Samrajya Laxmi, and himself, and ask for their opinions on administrative matters, in order to reduce further friction between himself and the royalty. Rajendra was put in charge of defense, finance, and foreign relations; while Samrajya Laxmi was put in charge of justice, accountancy, and civil administration. Nevertheless, Rajendra's activities were heavily influenced by the advice of Samrajya Laxmi, while the Junior Queen Rajya Laxmi had no say in any matter; furthermore, the King and the Senior Queen did not dare yet to outright dismiss Bhimsen's plans and advice, fearful of the large army under his command. This arrangement worked well for the next three years; for instance, on 26 August 1833, Nepal was struck by a great earthquake, and all three power holders were able to coordinate with each other and provide emergency relief to the citizens. (Note: There were two fore-shocks occurring at 6:30 PM and 11:30 PM, with the main shock, felt around 11:55 PM Calcutta time (10:58 PM Kathmandu time). The epicenter was close to Kathmandu. It has been estimated that its epicenter was around 28.0°N, 86.0°E and its magnitude to be around 7.7 Mw. It reportedly killed 414 people, wounded 172 people, and destroyed 4040 houses in Nepal.)

=== Provocation by the frustrated Senior Queen ===
Queen Samrajya Laxmi was ambitious to show herself as powerful and as independent as her predecessor Queen Tripurasundari. Initially, King Rajendra supported Bhimsen instead of Ranbir Singh and the removal of Ranabir Singh sabotaged the Queen's plan. King Rajendra appointed Bhimsen to the post of Commander-In-Chief and praised Bhimsen for his long service to the nation. However, Queen Samrajya Laxmi would harass King Rajendra by such words as:

You are an independent Raja indeed. You are a slave of Bhim Sen Thapa.... a sheep led to the slaughter. Has he bewitch you or has he poured lead into your ears rendering you deaf. Let me and my children leave you to the fate your imbecility deserve, or ...you become religious and go to Benaras to bath and pray and leave me without the eldest boy to rule the country and try if a woman can succeed where a man has failed in annihilating the Thapas and asserting the lawful rights of sovereignty among her people.

Queen Samrajya Laxmi was very frustrated by King Rajendra's failure to remove Bhimsen from power. On 8 November 1835, she caused a turmoil by leaving the Durbar at midnight, angered by King Rajendra's inability to stop Bhimsen from dealings with the Governor General, with whom she felt the King should be directly dealing with. Meanwhile, she demanded the King to establish a new regiment; however the King failed to obtain the required financial allocation from the Mukhtiyar. Instead, King Rajendra authorized Bhimsen with a Sunnad in favour of the Mukhtiyar. Upon learning this, the Queen Samrajya Laxmi shouted angrily at King Rajendra:

You have given him a Sunnad making once for all everything to the Minister, who with his family and creatures will eat up all so that neither have we any right nor any means to provide for our children. You are no Raja, other rule and spend, you have your mere gaddi and mouthful to eat. Such too is my share and your children.

She also demanded an allocation of Rs. 50,000 for her children from the Terai revenues. If her demands were not to be met, she threatened to part from the state affairs. However, despite all her efforts to pressurize King Rajendra, she achieved no success.

=== Rivalry with British envoy and libel against Bhimsen by Hodgson ===
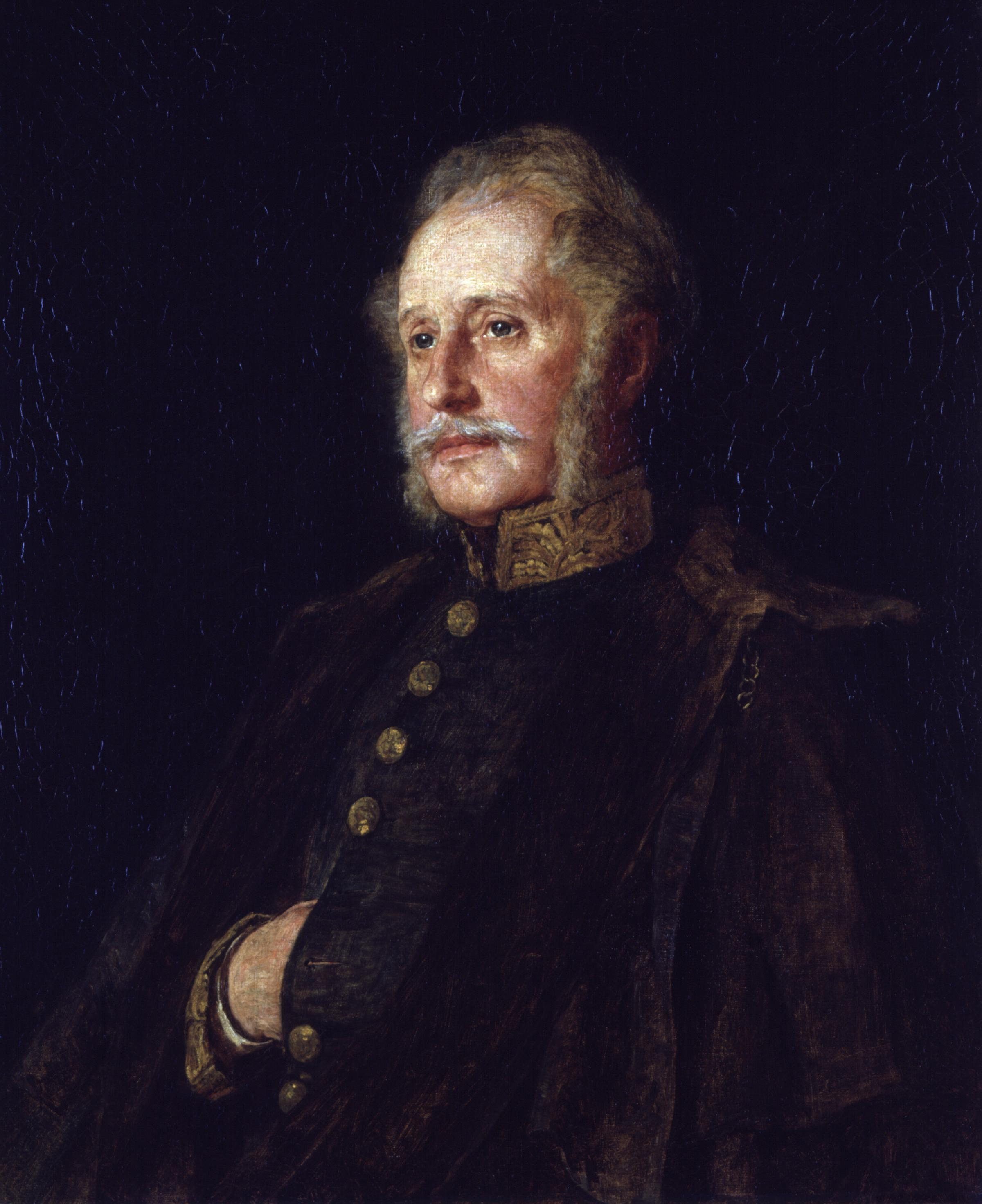
Portrait of British Resident Brian Houghton Hodgson, Bhimsen's primary political rival.

In 1833, Brian Hodgson, who had spent many years in Nepal serving as the Assistant Resident, and who had a good knowledge about Nepal's biodiversity, culture, and politics, became the new British Resident. Bhimsen had known the motives of British colonial policies of engulfing native states in India carried by Lord Wellesley and therefore he considered them as the detrimental force that encourages the factional fightings to turn states into chaos and ultimately colonizes them. British historian William Wilson Hunter even stated that the British Residency has been the centre of anti-Bhimsen politics. Bhimsen had been keeping the British Residents out of any direct communications with the King since 1816. Hodgson considered Bhimsen as a "vigorous, ambitious but unprincipled opponent". Thus, Hodgson was desperate to have direct communications with the King and wanted to break Bhimsen's monopoly over the control of British Residents, thereby aspiring for his fall from power.

Hodgson began to portray Bhimsen as an immoral person in his reports to his superior, Governor General of India, on 18 February 1833. Hodgson reported to the Governor General that the Pande family who deserved the high ranks of the state was sidelined from the Court by Bhimsen and Bhimsen's relatives were installed in every offices monopolizing "all the loaves and fishes". But in fact, a lot of Pande politicians had occupied high ranks in the Bharadari Sabha (Council of State) and other ranks in the government offices which includes Dalabhanjan Pande, Ranajit Pande, Karbir Pande, Rana Jang Pande and Bhotu Pande. In fact, Bhimsen even called back his arch rivals like Rana Jang Pande and Karbir Pande to assume some position in the government offices. Furthermore, Bhimsen did not retain the judiciary powers in his family and had entrusted it to the Pande family member Dalabhanjan Pande through a Lalmohar traditionally dated Roj 5 Sudi 3 Falgun 1883 Bikram Samvat (1827 CE) which also stressed on the principles of equality before the law. Thus, Historian Chittaranjan Nepali considers this writing of Hodgson to Governor General as a libel attempt against Bhimsen.

So long as order prevails so long, I think we could, if we deemed it expedient, by coming forward distinctly to countenance the weaker party at present, give it the pre ponderance.

— Resident Hodgson suggesting anti-Mukhtiyar politics to Governor General of India, June 1837

Hodgson also fabricated details about Bhimsen to the Governor General, that "mere children of his kindred hold high commands" and gave two fictional names "Colonel Shamsher Singh, aged 13, and Colonel Bahadur Jang, aged 12 years" without any details of their relationship with Bhimsen. Historian Chittaranjan Nepali counters Hodgson's assertion by assuming Bhimsen's adoptive son ('Dharmaputra') Sher Jung Thapa as an original intent of Hodgson, who was also, however, not promoted to the position of Colonelship at the time of issuance of this report. Sher Jung was initially given a minor rank of Captain in 1825 (1882 Bikram Samvat) and was promoted to Colonelship only after a long period of 10 years in 1835 (1892 Bikram Samvat). Historian Nepali further contends that Bhimsen didn't promote his other minor relatives to high commands based on the fact that even the closest relatives like Sher Jung was not promoted, and contends that it was a political intrigue on the part of Hodgson to defame Bhimsen. Hodgson further fabricated a story to the Governor General of India that King Rajendra rejected treatments from court physicians during his illness on the context of them being Bhimsen's men and the King further blamed Bhimsen to have poisoned both his father and grandfather to death; which he further alluded that the King's allegations against Bhimsen was true and popular general belief among the Nepalese public. (Note: Resident Hodgson wrote following to Governor General of India on the report dated 18 February 1833: "The spirit of the Royal and Ministerial parties may be conceived from the fact that the Raja, having fallen ill last rains, resolutely and against all possible exertions of influence refused to employ the Court physician, from an avowed fear of being poisoned or otherwise made away with, as he said his father and grandfather had been, by Bhim Sen's procurement. The quarrels of the faculty and the disgrace of the Court physician made the matter public; and I am sorry to say the general opinion was that Raja's allegation was true in its all parts both as respected himself and his father. The physician is a creature of the Minister's, and now has held the office of Raj Vaidya for thirty years.") However, King Rajendra never mentioned that he rejected treatments on the pretext of possible poisoning by Bhimsen's alleged court physicians, however, in his 1839 letter to Chinese Amban wrote that both of his parents were poisoned to death by Bhimsen's alleged court physicians during their illness. Also, later in 1839 during the revival of poisoning cases against Bhimsen, two new additional fabricated cases of death by poisoning of King Girvan and his wife was brought. Furthermore, it was widely known that King Rajendra's grandfather King Rana Bahadur Shah died from the sword assault by his step-brother Sher Bahadur Shah during an open court discussion while his father King Girvan Yuddha Bikram Shah along with his wife died from the smallpox to which historian Chittaranjan Nepali contends as another attempt of libel against Bhimsen by Hodgson.

=== Failure of Mathabar Singh Thapa's mission to Britain ===
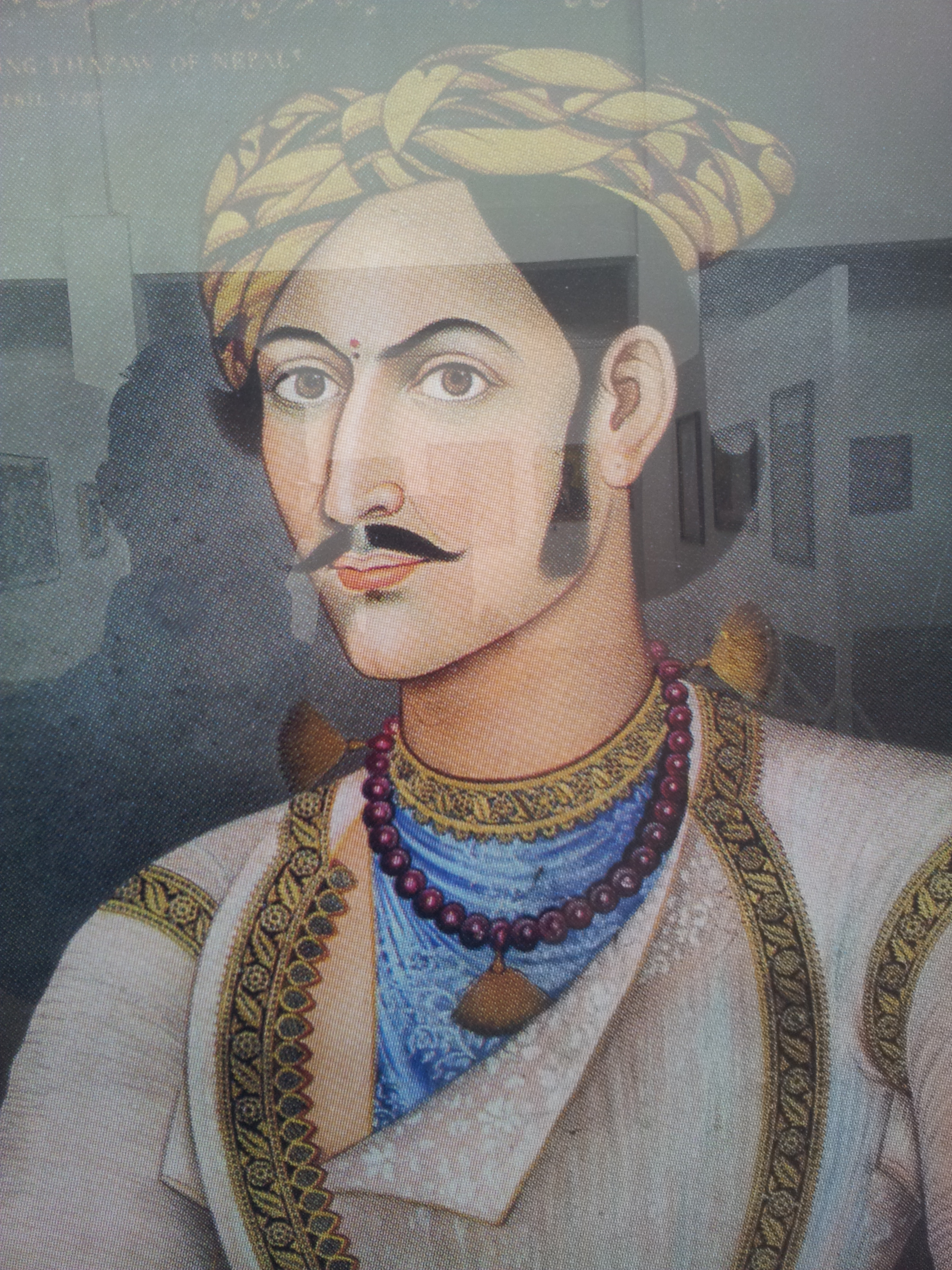
Portrait of Colonel Mathabar Singh Thapa from 1831

Although the British Residents were officially instructed to keep out of the internal politics of Nepal, the Resident was courted by both the King as well as the Mukhtiyar. Hodgson was waiting for an opportunity to exploit the rift between the Mukhtiyar and the royal family and begin a more aggressive campaign to increase British influence and trading opportunities. Hodgson also believed the large standing army to be a security threat and that the border tensions could be pacified if the King was directly in control, rather than a Mukhtiyar who needed to keep on the right side of the army. By 1834, Hodgson had come to a conclusion that he would not be able to have his way so long as Bhimsen was in control of the Nepalese administration; thus he strongly sympathized with the Pande faction, and he wished to install Fateh Jung Shah, who was more favorably disposed to him, as the Mukhtiyar. Hodgson reported to the Government of India on the dominance of Bhimsen over the position of the King as:

the Rajah is surrounded by the Minister's creature and is at present helpless. Bhim Sen has all the powers in his hands...The Rajah is so uncomfortable in his honorary confinement that the probability is the Minister may work on him with success to make voluntary retirement of his throne in favour of his infant son and in the highest conformity with the sacred code of the Hindu, to which His Highness is proved.

In August 1834, Hodgson proposed to conduct a new commercial treaty between Nepal and Britain, which Bhimsen in principle agreed to but disagreed with several of the clauses. At a time when his authority was diminishing, Bhimsen could not afford to antagonize the Resident; but at the same time, he could not accept his proposals and be seen as subservient to the British by the Nepalese court. Nevertheless, he tried to maintain a friendly and conciliatory attitude toward the Resident, in order to win him as his ally, by loosening the restrictions on his movements and granting direct access to the King.

In the meantime, a royal letter was received from the Maharaja Ranjit Singh, ruler of Sikh Empire in Punjab, addressed to King Rajendra. The Nepalese court seized this opportunity to re-establish diplomatic contact with Punjab as well as other states such as Burma and Gwalior. In April 1835, Bhimsen also hatched a plan to make a state visit to Britain, hoping to force Britain to acknowledge the sovereignty of Nepal; but since he could not make the visit himself, his nephew Colonel Mathabar Singh Thapa was chosen as the representative of Nepal, bearing a few gifts and a letter from King Rajendra addressed to King William IV. The idea was initially received favorably by Hodgson as well as the Governor-General, who hoped that the mission could increase the trust between the two nations. In this process, Mathabar Singh was promoted to Chota General; his brother, Ranbir Singh, the governor of Palpa, was made Full General; and Mathabar's nephew, the sixteen-year-old Sher Jung Thapa, was made Commanding Colonel. Thus, Bhimsen managed to consolidate his military powers. Both Rajendra and Samrajya Laxmi were also pleased with this plan, and on 1 November 1835, Bhimsen was conferred the title of Commander-in-Chief. On 27 November 1835, Mathabar Singh left Kathmandu with a retinue of two thousand men, including 200 officers and 600 soldiers, for London via Calcutta.

Mathabar was given a grand welcome in Calcutta by the acting Governor-General Charles Metcalfe; and while there, Mathabar started to indulge in needless luxuries and show offs. Meanwhile, Hodgson sent a secret letter to Metcalfe asking him not to allow Mathabar to make a state visit to Britain. Hence, Metcalfe was only willing to grant him the visa of an ordinary traveler, and not the diplomatic visa of a state representative. Mathabar thus returned to Nepal in March 1836, having wasted a vast sum of money, without accomplishing any of his goals. The deliberate sabotage of Mathabar's mission was Hodgson's diplomatic attack against Bhimsen. Until that time, it was widely believed by both the royal family as well as the common people that Bhimsen's good relationship with the high ranking British officials, since he was the only one allowed to communicate with them, was responsible for preventing the East India Company to take full control of Nepal. The mission's failure unambiguously revealed to everyone that this was not the case, and severely undermined Bhimsen's political credibility. Mathabar Singh spent a sum of one lakh and fifty thousand in Calcutta on the fruitless mission. Mathabar's extravagant expenditure was also heavily criticized by Samrajya Laxmi, since at that time the state coffer was in dire condition; and to pacify her, Bhimsen had to reimburse the extra expenses from his own pockets.

=== Rise of the Kala Pandes ===
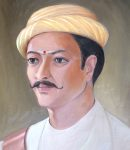
Portrait of Ranajang Pande.

By this time, Ranajang Pande, the youngest son of Damodar Pande, was stationed as a captain in the army in Kathmandu. He was aware of the disunity between Samrajya Laxmi and Bhimsen, and thus he had secretly expressed his loyalty to Samrajya Laxmi and had vowed to help her in bringing Bhimsen down for all the wrongs he had committed against his family. Beforehand, Karbir Pande and his three brothers including Rana Jang, were already called back from Terai region and were given the governmental posts by Bhimsen himself based on the directives issued on traditionally dated 1872 Bikram Samvat, Poush Sudi 12 Roj 6 (1815-16 CE). Historian Chittaranjan Nepali contends that this excessive decency and benevolence towards his arch rivals Pandes is one of the major reason for his downfall. In November 1834, Ranajang requested to the King for the restoration of his family properties and honors, to which the King of Nepal favorably received the request.

From that day may be reckoned, the commencement of a counter-revolution and of those intrigues of the Kala Pandes which eventually succeeded so well in overthrowing of their rivals and in repaying the cruelties that they themselves suffered at his [Bhimsen's] hands.

— Assistant British Resident J.R. Tickell after the restoration of honors of Kala Pandes

Ranajang also tried to communicate with the Chinese Amban in Lhasa to restore his family connections with Tibet and falsely tagged Bhimsen being inclined to the enemy of China i.e. the British. (Note: In reply, the Chinese Amban wrote to the King of Nepal to depute Ranajang in the next quinquennial mission to Peking; however, the King deputed Pushkar Shah.) Factions in the Nepalese court had also started to develop around the rivalry between the two queens, with the Senior Queen supporting the Pandes, while the Junior Queen supporting the Thapas. About a month after Mathabar's return to Kathmandu, a child was born out of a sexual relationship between him and his widowed sister-in-law. It was a customary practice for a widowed woman to marry and have a sexual relationship with her husband's brother among all 4 Varna and 36 castes of Nepal including the high caste Upadhyaya Brahmans and Chhetris, which was safeguarded by then prevalent Sanatana practices. However, this news was spread all over the country by the Pande faction to defame Mathabar Singh, and the resulting public disgrace forced Mathabar Singh to leave Kathmandu and reside in his ancestral home in Pipal Thok, Borlang, Gorkha. To save face, Bhimsen gave Mathabar the governorship of Gorkha. Thus, British Historian Perceval Landon considered the charge to be "a mere prejudice" against Mathabar and a part of "unceasing intrigues" of the Pande faction for the "exhibition of their hostility". (Note: Later in July 1836, Bhimsen issued a Lalmohar prohibiting the customary marriages and sexual relationships with the "married wife of one's own elder brother" condemning it as "a great sin".)

Taking advantage of Mathabar's absence in Kathmandu, the military battalions under his command were distributed to other courtiers during the annual muster at the beginning of 1837. Nevertheless, Bhimsen managed to secure his and his family members' positions in the civil and military offices. An investigation was also started to check Bhimsen's expenditures in establishing various battalions. Such events led the courtiers to feel that Bhimsen's Mukhtiyari would not last very long; thus Ranbir Singh, in the hopes of becoming the next Mukhtiyar, wrote a letter to the King asking him to be recalled to Kathmandu from Palpa. His wish was granted; and Bhimsen, pleased to see his brother after many years, made Ranbir Singh the acting Mukhtiyar and decided to go to his ancestral home in Borlang Gorkha for the sake of pilgrimage. But in truth, Bhimsen had gone to Gorkha to placate his nephew and bring him back to Kathmandu.

In Bhimsen's absence, King Rajendra established a new battalion, Hanuman Dal, to be kept under his personal command. By February 1837, both Ranajang and his brother, Ranadal Pande, had been promoted to the position of a kaji; and Ranajang was made a personal secretary to the King, while Ranadal Pande was made the governor of Palpa. Ranjang was also made the chief palace guard, the position formerly occupied by Ranbir Singh and then Bhimsen. Thus, this curtailed Bhimsen's access to the royal family. On 14 June 1837, the King took over the command of all the battalions put in charge of various courtiers, and himself became the Commander-in-Chief.

=== Poisoning case ===
...some of his (Raja) Counsellors were of openly, or secretly, favourable to the Thapas, and had suggested to him their release, upon the ground that no sufficient proof had been adduced of the accessor of these persons to the poisoning. High Highness said that where recently others wished to spill the blood of Thapas', he had resisted; that he had no wish or intention to touch their lives... even if there are no poisoning in the case, yet that the Thapas' had committed great wrong against his (Raja) person and authority...

— Reports from British Resident to Governor General of India dated 18 September 1837

On 24 July 1837, Rajendra's youngest son, Devendra Bikram Shah, an infant of six months, died suddenly. It was at once rumored that the child had died of poison intended for his mother the Senior Queen Samrajya Laxmi Devi: given at the instigation of Bhimsen, or someone of his faction. On this charge, Bhimsen, his brother Ranbir Singh, his nephew Mathbar Singh, their families, the court physicians, Sardar Ekdev and Eksurya Upadhyay, and his deputy Bhajuman Baidya, with a few more of the nearest relatives of the Thapas were incarcerated, proclaimed outcasts, and their properties confiscated. The physicians Ekdev and Eksurya, being Brahmins, were severely tortured but spared, while Bhajuman Baidya was impaled and killed. (Note: Historian Baburam Acharya writes that Bhajuman Baidya confessed that he treated the young prince with the medicine provided by Ekadev Baidya under torture. But Ekadev Baidya did not admit the charge even when he was treated with a red-hot iron on his cheeks, his eyes taken out, skin cut and rubbed with salt and peppers.) Under torture, Ekdev confessed, and thus confirmed a widely circulated rumor, that he was directed by Bhimsen to poison not just Devendra, but King Girvan as well.

There is a general consensus among historians that Bhimsen was not behind the poisoning. Bhimsen had nothing to gain by killing an infant less a year old, and the accusation was simply a ruse to answer foreign inquiries on Bhimsen's imprisonment. It was a general practice among the physicians of the time to check the strength of their medicine by first letting the mother taste it, before giving it to their newborn. It was later rumored that it was the Junior Queen who had actually contrived to kill the Senior Queen by poisoning the medicine intended for her newborn. While the poison did not express itself on the intended Queen, it managed to kill the infant prince, and the powerless Bhimsen was made a convenient scapegoat. Historian Gyanmani Nepal contends this to be closer to the truth. Historian William Wilson Hunter contended that "the whole charge was an invention trumped up by the Pandis to secure Bhim Sen's overthrow as they themselves confessed six years later". Hodgson on his reports to Governor General of India dated 18 September 1837 revealed that in fact King Rajendra knowingly held Bhimsen in the false charges because of his personal enmity.

=== Dismissal from office and subsequent pardon ===
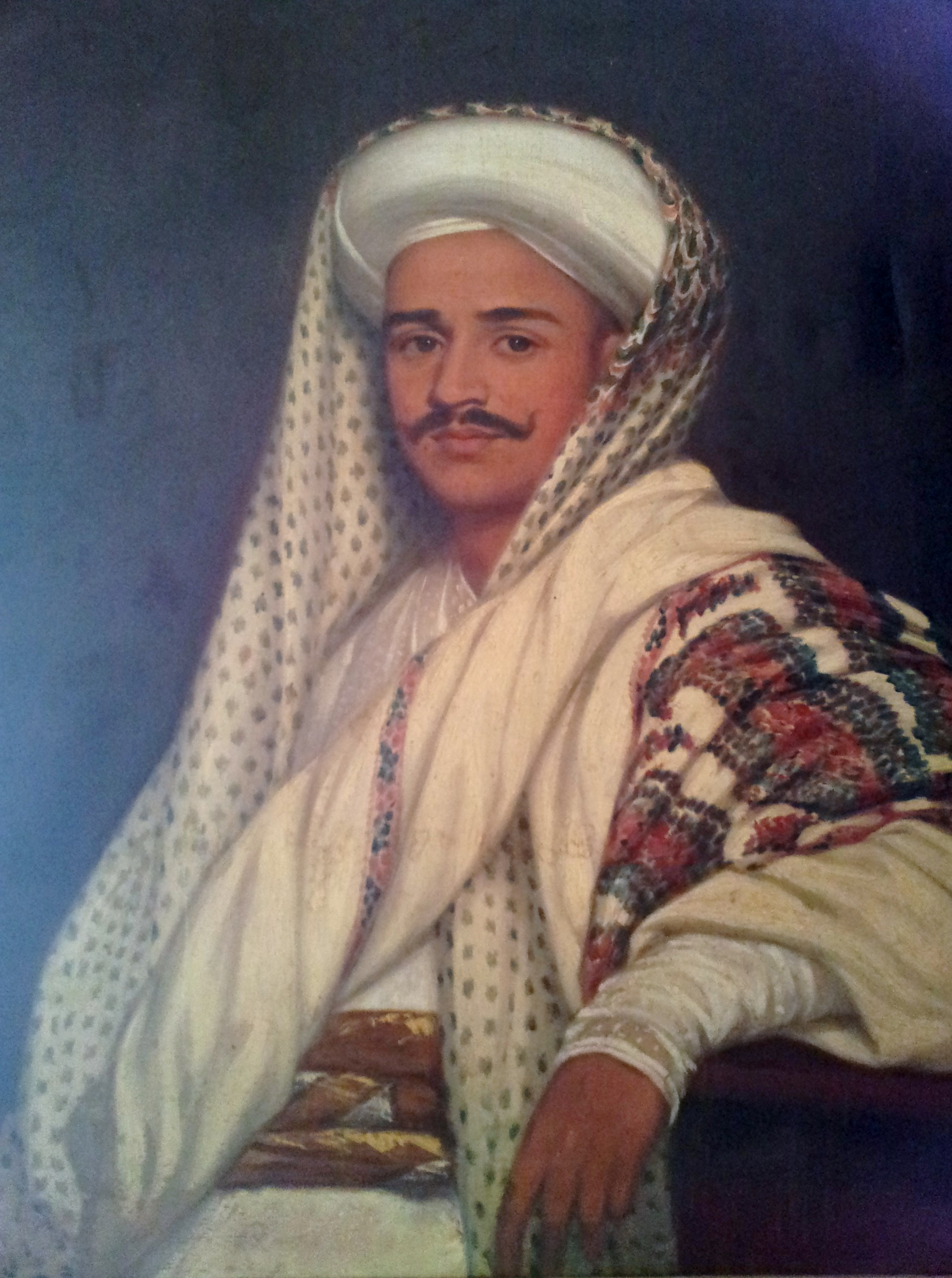
Portrait of Bhimsen's ally Pandit Ranga Nath Poudyal.

Immediately after the incarceration of the Thapas, a new government with joint Mukhtiyars was formed with Ranganath Paudel as the head of civil administration, and Dalbhanjan Pande and Ranajang Pande as joint heads of military administration. This appointment established the Pandes as the dominant faction in the court, and they started to make preparations for war with the British in order to win back the lost territories of Kumaon and Garhwal. While such war posturing was nothing new, the din the Pandes created alarmed not just the Resident Hodgson but the opposing court factions as well, who saw their aggressive policy as detrimental to the survival of the country. After about three months in power, under pressure from the opposing factions, the King removed Ranjang as Mukhtiyar and Ranganath Paudel, who was favorably inclined towards the Thapas, was chosen as the sole Mukhtiyar.

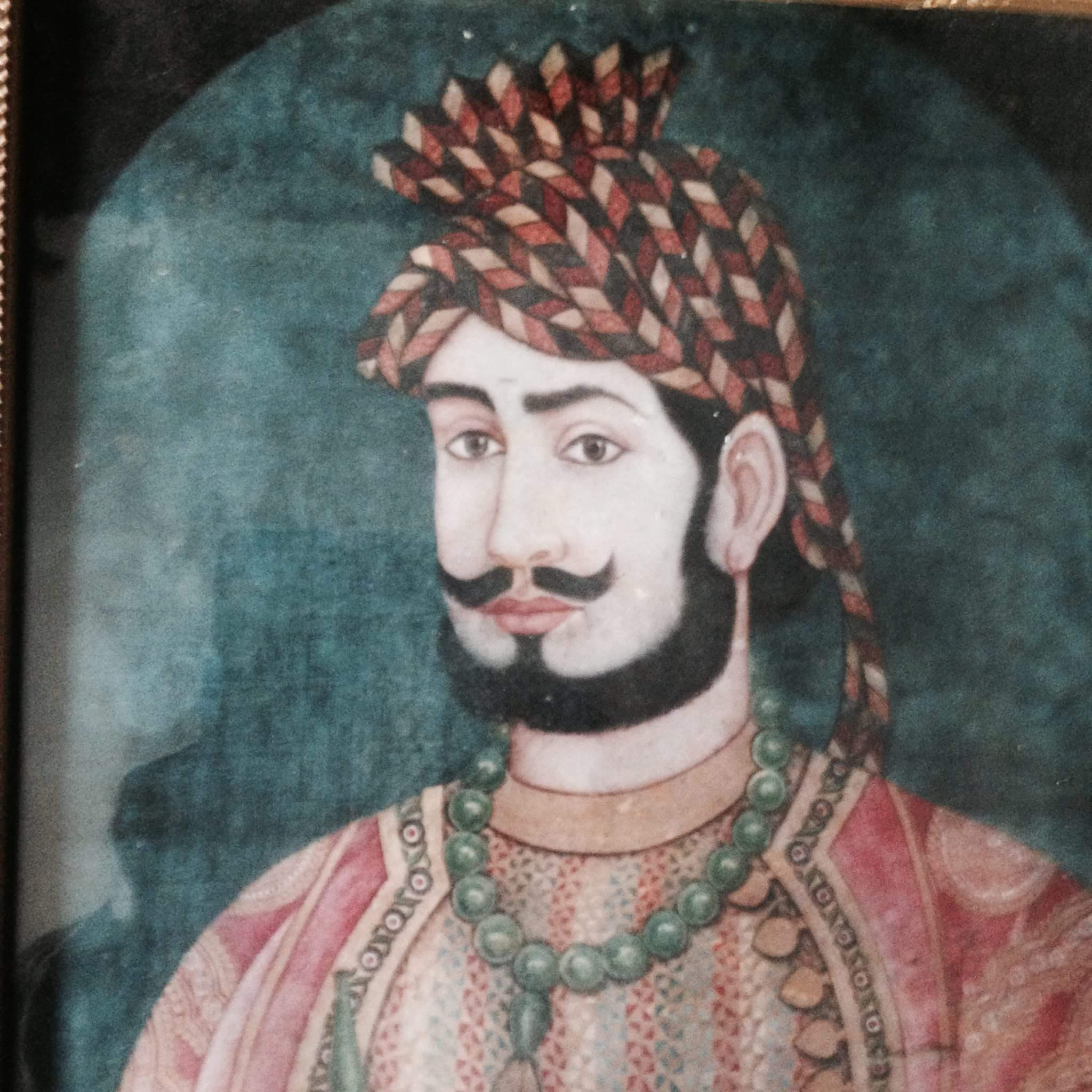
Mathabar Singh Thapa detained at Sikh Empire

King Rajendra, due to the fear of a possible rebellion, restricted the Bhimsen established Singhanath battalion, to move out of the Kathmandu valley through a Rokka issued in March 1838 (Chaitra 1894 Bikram Samvat). Thereafter, Bhimsen's case was re-opened and heard in the royal court. Fearful that the Pandes would re-establish their power, Fatte Jang Shah, Mukhtiyar Ranga Nath Poudel, and the Junior Queen Rajya Laxmi Devi obtained from the King the liberation of Bhimsen, Mathabar, and the rest of the faction, in March 1838 about eight months after they were incarcerated for the poisoning case. British historians William Hunter and Henry Oldfied both asserted that Bhimsen fell into the King's feet and begged for mercy before receiving the pardon which is counterargued by Nepalese Historian Chittaranjan Nepali as a "mere mockery of his great personality". Some of the Thapa family's confiscated land, as well as the Bagh Durbar, was also returned. Upon his release, the soldiers loyal to Bhimsen crowded behind him in jubilation and followed him up to his house; a similar treatment was given to Mathabar Singh and Sher Jung Thapa. Though only some of their confiscated properties were returned by the initial Lalmohar, the second Lalmohar issued at the end of 1838 (Marga month of 1895 Bikram Samvat) completely returned all of their confiscated properties. Although pardon had been granted to Bhimsen, his former office was not re-instated; thus he went to live in retirement at his patrimony in Borlang, Gorkha.

However, Ranganath Poudel, finding himself unsupported by the King, resigned from the Mukhtiyari, which was then conferred on Pushkar Shah; but Pushkar Shah was only a nominal head, and the actual authority was bestowed on Ranjang Pande. In March 1838, King Rajendra sent Mathabar Singh on a confidential mission to Sikh Emperor Ranjit Singh; initially he was arrested in May 1838 by the British during night time at Sutlej river, later allowed to proceed to Sikh capital but ultimately deported back to the British surveillance in Shimla by the Sikh Emperor on the suspicion of anti-British activities. (Note: Historian William Wilson Hunter contended that Mathabar Singh fled to Sikh capital in Punjab while pretending to go on a hunting trip to Terai, however, Historian Henry Ambrose Oldfield contended that Mathabar Singh was sent "into a sort of honorable exile" on an undisclosed confidential mission to Ranjit Singh. The latter assertion is largely substantiated by the writings of King Rajendra Bikram who also stated that he ordered Mathabar Singh to convey a secret message to Sikh Emperor Ranjit Singh. In May 1838, Mathabar Singh was taken into custody by the British authorities during the night time at the Sutlej river. At the end of 1838, he was set free by the British authorities to proceed towards his mission to Lahore. However, the Sikh Emperor Ranjit Singh deported him back to British surveillance in Shimla on charges of anti-British activities and "openly and indignantly disavowed" all agreements with Nepal. Historian Nepali contends that Mathabar Singh initially didn't return to Nepal when he saw his family trapped into a political turmoil there and stayed in the court of Sikh Emperor Ranjit Singh who allowed him to stay for some years but ultimately deported him back to British authorities on the suspicion of anti-British activities.) Sensing that a catastrophe was going to befall the Thapas, Ranbir Singh gave up all his property and became a sanyasi, titling himself Abhayanand Puri but Bhimsen Thapa preferred to remain in his old home in Gorkha. The Pandes were now in full possession of power; they had gained over the King to their side by flattery. The Senior Queen had been a firm supporter of their faction, and they endeavored to secure popularity in the army by promises of war and plunder.

== Suicide: 1839 ==
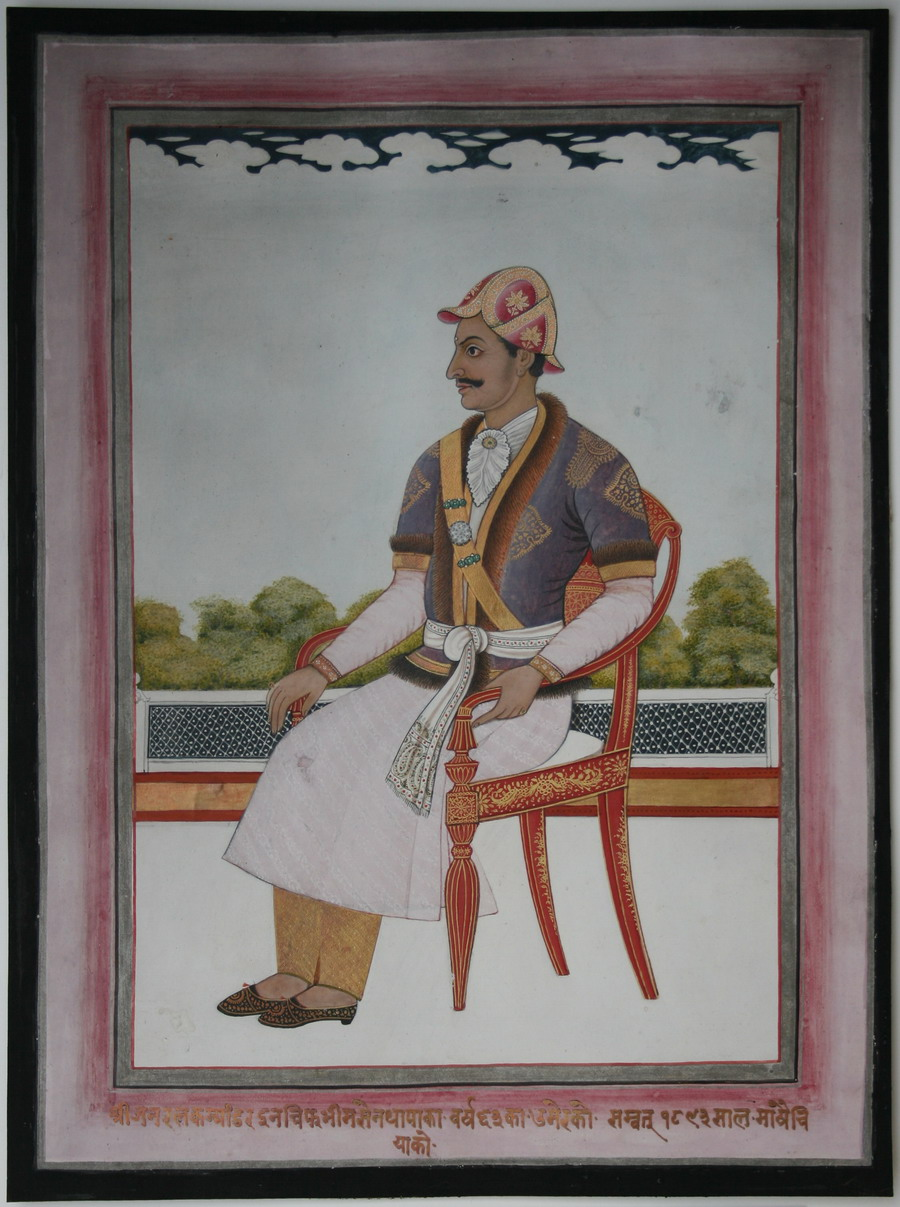
A commemorative portrait of Bhimsen Thapa dated 1839. In the description given in the portrait, he is titled as General Commander-in-Chief.

At the beginning of 1839, Ranajang Pande was made the sole Mukhtiyar. However, knowledge about Ranajang's war preparations and his communication with other princely states of India, fomenting anti-British sentiments, alarmed the Governor-General of the time, Lord Auckland, who mobilized some British troops near the border of Nepal. In order to resolve this diplomatic fiasco, Bhimsen was recalled from Gorkha and the rest of his confiscated property was also released. Bhimsen suggested some of the battalions under Ranjang's command to be given to other courtiers, thus severely weakening Ranjang's military power, and in the process convincing the British that Nepal was not on the path to war. The King agreed to this arrangement; however, this aroused a strong suspicion in Samrajya Laxmi, who determined to eradicate Bhimsen's influence permanently.

By this time, Bhimsen's furious nephew Mathabar Singh was living at the Sikh court in Punjab which caused fear among King Rajendra and Rana Jang that he would bring British support or wreak havoc in the case Bhimsen was attacked. Therefore, secret assassins were sent by the Nepalese royal court to poison him at Punjab. After assassins failed to poison him, with a desire to eliminate both uncle and nephew together, Rana Jang attempted to call him back to Nepal by making "specious promises" which Mathabar Singh thwarted after getting a hold of Rana Jang's intentions. In April 1839, the accusation of poisoning the young prince in 1837, along with two other fabricated cases, was revived against Bhimsen and his faction, and forged papers and evidence were produced professing to incriminate him. The date when Bhimsen was charged on the alleged crime was 18 May 1839, according to then Assistant British Resident J.R. Tickell. The two fabricated cases were the poisoning of the King Girvan's wife and King Girvan Yuddha himself who was widely known to have died from smallpox. Bhimsen pleaded and asked the proof of these additional crimes for which he had been charged and asked that why these accusations were not brought when he was dismissed and imprisoned. Only Rana Jang spoke against him in the Darbar. The Assistant British Resident J.R. Tickell observed that "...Not a voice raised in his (Bhimsen's) behalf throughout the Darbar, the chiefs sat by in dejected silence." Bhimsen appealed for justice and tried to defend himself, but the King, blindly believing the forgeries, denounced him as a traitor and put him in house arrest in a room at the ground floor of his own Bagh Durbar. Although pardon had already been given, based on these forged evidences, the court physicians, Ekdev and Eksurya Upadhyay were again arrested and tortured. (Note: Historian Oldfield writes: "The Court physician who had attended the child (a Brahman, and whose life was therefore sacred), was burnt on the forehead and cheeks till his brain and jaws were exposed. The under physician, a Niwar, was impaled alive, and his heart was extracted while he was yet living. Still no evidence against Bhim Sen or any of the accused could be extorted even by these horrible atrocities, which were perpetrated not only by the order, but in the presence of the Rajah.) Except for Mathabar Singh, who was under British surveillance in India, rest of the Thapa family were again arrested, their properties confiscated, were declared outcasts, and were proclaimed to be expelled from every public office for seven generations.

It is needless to trace further his cruel persecutions. Like a convicted felon, he lingered in his dungeon during his few remaining days; his ears were assailed from day to day by with threats of renewed torments-with being exposed plunged up to the neck in a heap of human ordure or filth, with having his wife paraded naked through the city-till, totally worn out by accumulated torments, the wretched man anticipated further malice by committing suicide.

— Resident Hodgson on torture and suicide of Bhimsen

While under house arrest, Bhimsen smuggled a letter to the Resident Hodgson appealing him to intervene on his behalf, which Hodgson refused at that moment but sought permission from his superiors to do so. Bhimsen was given brutal treatment at the orders of Rana Jang during the arrest. He was kept "almost starved" in a dark underground cell which was "less a prison than a ditch of filth". Rana Jang did not choose direct assassination of Bhimsen but some strong calculated savage measures to make Bhimsen commit suicide. One of the savage measures was that the false rumours on the method of punishment to Bhimsen was circulated every day. Meanwhile, Bhimsen's third wife, Bhakta Kumari, happened to insult the Senior Queen Samrajya Laxmi, who upon hearing about this insult, was so angered that she order Bhakta Kumari to be removed from Bagh Durbar and put in a common jail. After this, the rival faction spread a rumor around Kathmandu that Bhakta Kumari would be stripped of her clothes and paraded through the streets of the city and he would be forced to watch it while being dipped into a mound of human faeces. This rumor also fell on Bhimsen's ears; and unable to bear such indignity, Bhimsen attempted suicide by slitting his throat with a khukuri. The news of this attempted suicide further angered the King and the Queen, who came to look at his body, and instead of feeling sympathy for the old minister and ordering immediate medical care, Bhimsen's blood-soaked, unconscious body was ordered that same day to be dragged through the streets and dumped by the same bank of Bishnumati River, where Bhimsen had dumped the dead bodies of 45 people 33 years ago during the Bhandarkhal massacre. Bhimsen finally died nine days later, surrounded by vultures, jackals, and dogs. Since suicide was considered a grave crime, soldiers were stationed at his death spot so that his body would not be removed and given ordinary cremation rites; and his body was allowed to be devoured by scavenging animals. On the spot where Bhimsen drew his last breath, a Shiva temple by the name Bhim-Mukteshwar was later constructed by his nephew Mathabar Singh Thapa, The road to Bhim Mukteshwar Temple is named after Mathwar and now known as Math Mukteshwar Marga.

While there is a general consensus on the cause and circumstances of Bhimsen's death, there is a disagreement on the exact date of his death. Baburam Acharya contends that Bhimsen attempted suicide on 28 July in his house and died nine days later on 5 August by the banks of Bishnumati; while Henry Ambrose Oldfield, William Wilson Hunter and Perceval Landon, contend that the suicide was attempted on 20 July and the death occurred nine days later on 29 July in his house, only after which his dead body was disposed by the banks of Bishnumati. Historian K.L. Pradhan and Gyanmani Nepal claimed the date to be 28 July. British Resident Hodgson's report of the event to the Governor General of India was dated 30 July 1839 where he reports the death on 29 July and precisely around 4pm on that date.

=== Reactions to suicide ===
On 30 July 1839, British Resident Hodgson wrote to the deputy secretary with the Governor General of India and reacted about the death of Bhimsen as a decline of a great statesman in his words "Thus, has perished, the great and able statesman". Then ruling governor general of India Lord Auckland replied to Hodgson through his secretary T.H. Maddock on a letter dated 15 August 1839. He stated:

I am directed to state that the measures of indignity, insult and cruelty which the Government of Nepal has adopted towards the late and able Minister of that State, have been viewed by the Governor-General with feelings of extreme disgust and abhorrence. They portray a spirit of vindictive hatred towards the late General Bhim Sen, venting itself on its unfortunate victim by outrages so atrocious and unmanly as to lead to the belief that the moral feeling of the Court has been much vitiated since the deposition of Bhim Sen, and that, under the present system and present Government, the manners of the people will rapidly sink into a state of barbarity from which they were being gradually weaned by a long course of pacific rule, under an able and comparatively enlightened administration.

— Letters from T.H. Maddock, Secretary of Government of India with the Governor-General to the Resident in Nepal dated Simla 15 August 1839

Historian Landon also posthumously expressed the brutality of death of Bhimsen in his book titled "Nepal":

His was a life of contrast and no Greek tragedy has ever presented a more dramatic catastrophe than his fearful end.

— British Historian Perceval Landon on death of Bhimsen

== Aftermath ==
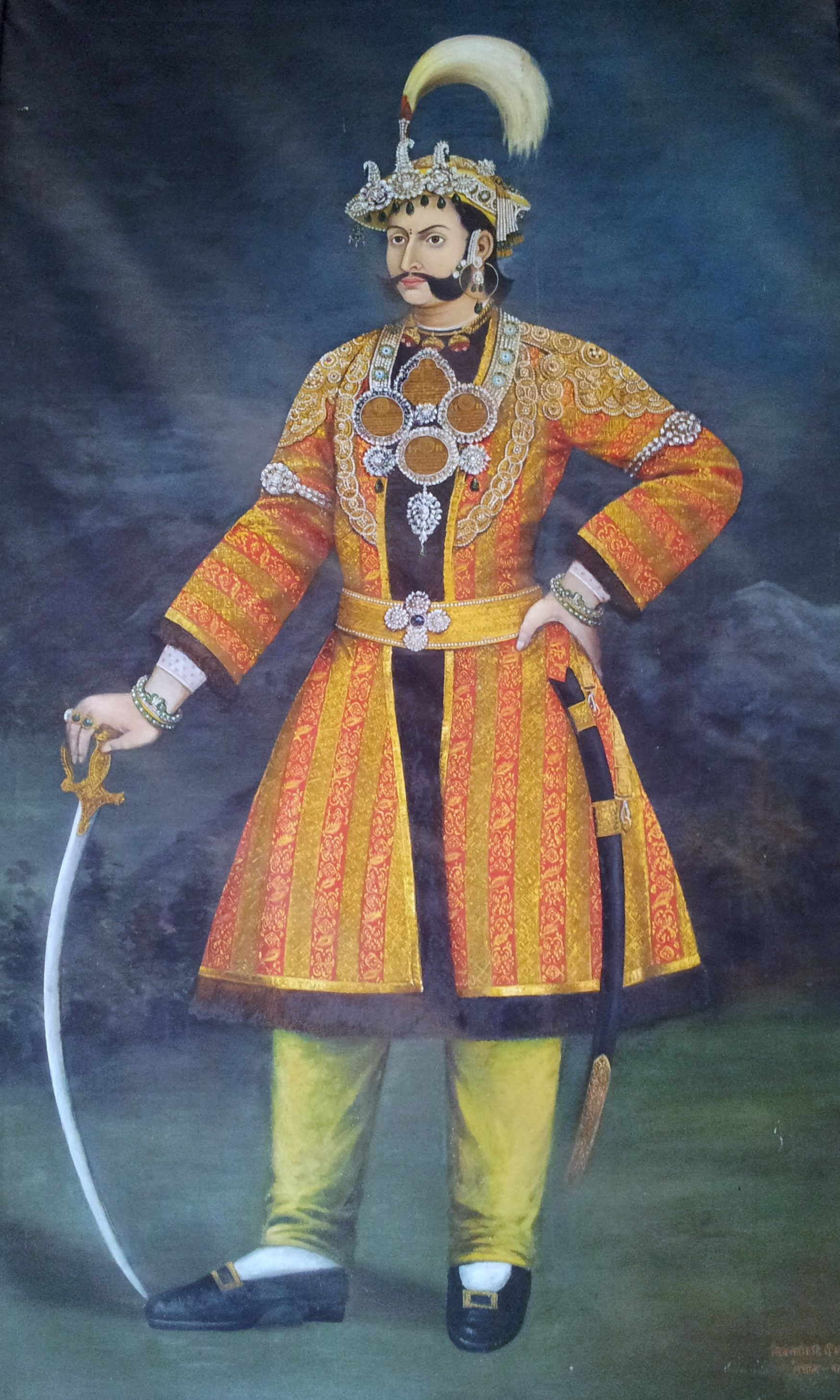
Portrait of nephew Mukhtiyar Mathabar Singh Thapa.

The death of Bhimsen Thapa did not resolve the factional fighting at court. Five months after Bhimsen's death, Ranajang Pande was again made prime minister; but Ranajang's inability to control the general lawlessness in the country forced him to resign from prime minister's office, which was then conferred on Pushkar Shah, based on Samrajya Laxmi's recommendation. While Pushkar Shah was not as anti-British as Ranajang Pande, he was nevertheless unfavorably predisposed towards them. During his tenure, a border dispute with the British in April 1840 resulted in Governor-General of India, 1st Earl of Auckland dispatching some troop near the Nepalese border once again, which Pushkar managed to resolve diplomatically. There was also a brief army mutiny in June 1840, as a reaction against the government's attempt to cut military salary, during which houses of several noblemen including Chautaria Pushkar Shah, in favor of this unpopular act were vandalized and burned. The mutiny was calmed only after King Rajendra publicly agreed not to implement the reform. Taking advantage of this mutiny, Resident Hodgson sent an incriminating report against the Nepalese government to his superiors in Calcutta. The Governor-General demanded the King to dissolve the incumbent government and appoint ministers more favorable towards the British. Thus, Pushkar Shah and his Pande associates were dismissed, and Fatte Jang Shah was appointed the Prime Minister in November 1840. Dismissal of Pushkar Shah curtailed Samrajya Laxmi's power. When Rajendra refused to abdicate in favor of their eldest son Surendra, the heir apparent, she left Kathmandu and settled at a border town in Terai. However, during the monsoon season, Samrajya Laxmi was afflicted with malaria from which she died in October 1841 at the age of twenty-seven.

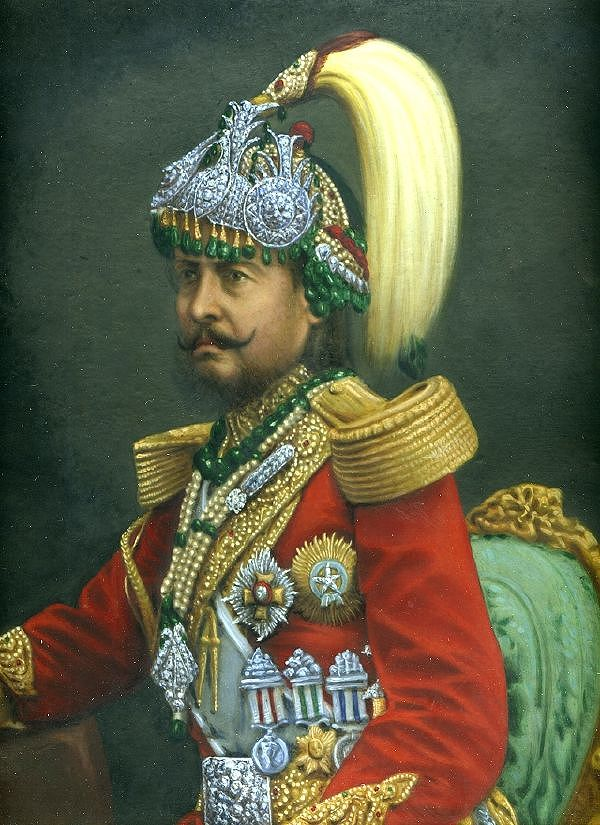
Portrait of Grand-nephew Prime Minister Jang Bahadur Kunwar Rana, the founder of Rana dynasty.

The death of the Senior Queen Samrajya Laxmi allowed the emergence of the Junior Queen Rajya Laxmi and Crown Prince Surendra onto the political stage. To consolidate her political influence and see her own son, rather than the heir apparent, Surendra, succeed on the throne, Rajya Laxmi had obtained pardon for Sher Jung Thapa and other jailed members of Thapa family. It was only after this that Bhimsen Thapa managed to get a symbolic funeral rite in August 1841. Thus, the Nepalese court was split into three factions centered around the King, the Queen, and the Crown Prince. Fatte Jung and his administration supported the King, the Thapas supported the Junior Queen, while the Pandes supported the Crown Prince. The resurgent Thapa coalition succeeded in sowing animosity between Fateh Jung's ministry and the Pande coalition, who were swiftly imprisoned. During his two years in power, Fatte Jung was able to maintain a rule of law in the country; however, after the incarceration of the Pandes, nobody could rein in the worsening sadistic tendencies, sometimes with fatal consequences, of Surendra, who was then still a minor. (Note: Whelpton: "In May 1842 the Residency diary records that one of Surendra's wives, a girl of only nine years, died after he had made her stand all day in a tank of water at the palace.") Under immense pressure from the Queen and the nobility, along with the backing from army and the general populace, the King in January 1843 handed the highest authority of the state to his Junior Queen, Rajya Laxmi, curtailing both his own and his son's power.

The Queen, seeking the support of her own son's claims to the throne over those of Surendra, invited Mathabar Singh Thapa back after almost six years in exile. Upon his arrival in Kathmandu, an investigation of his uncle's death took place, and a number of his Pande enemies were massacred. As for Ranajang Pande, he had by that time contracted mental illness and would not have posed any threat to Mathabar. Nevertheless, Ranajang was paraded through the streets and made to witness the execution of his family members, after which he was forced to commit suicide by poison. By December 1843, Mathabar Singh was appointed prime minister; but after a year in power, he alienated both the King and the Queen by supporting Surendra's claim over the throne. On 17 May 1845, he was assassinated, on both the King and Queen's orders, by his nephew, Jang Bahadur Kunwar. The death of Mathabar Singh ended the Thapa hegemony and set the stage for Kot massacre and the establishment of Rana Dynasty, a dictatorship of hereditary prime ministers, which was founded on the basic template provided by Bhimsen Thapa. These events provided the long period of stability the country needed but at the cost of political and economic development.

== Personal life ==
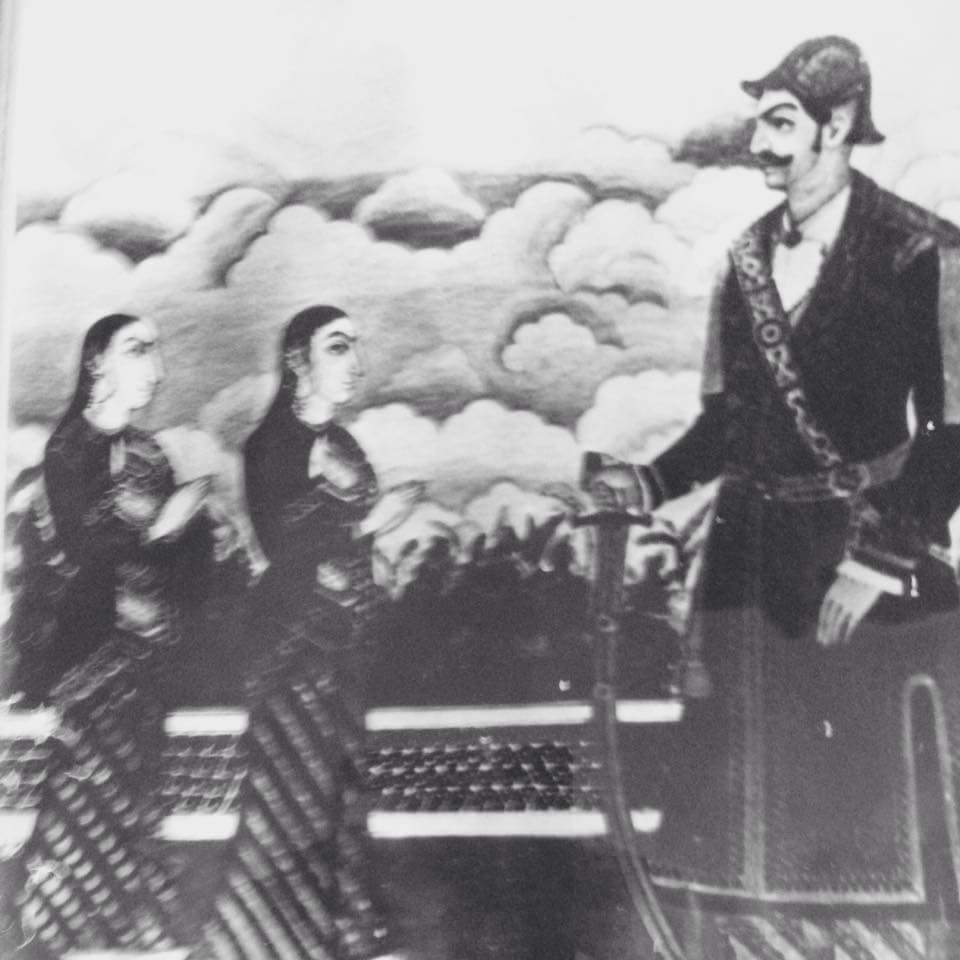
Bhimsen Thapa and his two wives

Bhimsen Thapa had three wives as per the stone inscription of Bhimbishwar Mahadev temple at Bungkot. His only son died at a young age in 1796 and his three daughters – Lalita Devi, Janak Kumari, and Dirgha Kumari were married to Pande nobles – Uday Bahadur Pande, Shamsher Bahadur Pande and Dal Bahadur Pande respectively. Uday Bahadur and Colonel Shamsher Bahadur were the sons of Kaji Bir Keshar Pande and Sardar Dal Bahadur was the son of Bir Keshar's cousin Garud Dhoj Pande, who were son of MulKaji Ranajit Pande.

On the month of Magh 1876 Bikram Samvat (1820 CE), Bhimsen's mother Satyarupa Maya issued a Dharmapatra prohibiting the partition of her five sons and the partition of the ancestral properties until her death. She later died on the month of the Ashadh 1877 Bikram Samvat (1820 CE) and the ancestral property partition was done on the month of Shrawan 1877 Bikram Samvat.

Bir Bhadra Thapa
Satyarupa Maya	Amar Singh Thapa	?
Bhimsen Thapa	Nain Singh Thapa	Bakhtawar Singh Thapa	Amrit Singh Thapa	Ranbir Singh Thapa	Ranbam Thapa	Ranzawar Thapa
? (son)	Lalita Devi Pande	Janak Kumari Pande	Dirgha Kumari Pande

== Legacy and assessments ==
=== Character and dominance ===
Bhimsen Thapa was a military leader and a de facto ruler of Nepal. Bhimsen is regarded as one of the national heroes of Nepal. He was considered a clever, farsighted, politically aware and practically diplomatic politician. Historian Chittaranjan Nepali contended that Bhimsen was an altruistic nationalist who never befriended with or accepted any foreign suzerainty. Historian Ludwig Stiller considered Bhimsen to be "..a very clever statesman but he was not an economist by any means." He was considered by many as a patriotic nationalist with a pervasive control over the Kingdom. In this context, his contemporary King Rana Bahadur Shah of Nepal had told that

If I die the nation will not die, but if Bhimsen dies the nation will collapse.

Similarly, British historian Perceval Landon in his book "Nepal" had quoted that

But during those three and thirty years Bhimsen was Nepal, and Nepal was Bhimsen.

Thus, has perished, the great and able statesman who for more than thirty years had ruled this kingdom with more than regal sway, just two years after his sudden fall from power in 1837-prior to which event the uniform success of nearly all his measures had been no less remarkable than the energy and sagacity which so much promoted that success. He was indeed a man born to exercise dominion over his fellows alike by the means of his command and of persuasion. Nor am I aware of any native statesman of recent times, except Ranjit Singh, who is, all things considered, worthy to be compared with the late General Bhim Sen of Nepal.

— Report from the Resident (B.H. Hodgson) to Deputy Secretary with the Governor-General, dated 30 July 1839

Historian Baburam Acharya considered Bhimsen as an "unjust" but "devoted patriot" who developed and rewarded agricultural innovations in Nepal. He considered Bhimsen to be a nationalist with personal interest and a very cruel temperament. He termed Bhimsen as a military dictator who had control over 6000 armed forces. However, historian Kumar Pradhan negates that Bhimsen could not be termed as military dictator because he himself was dependent on Pajani System (annual renewal) for renewal of his every tenure of office. Pradhan also asserts that Bhimsen did not manipulate the Army which could be seen when he was not backed up by any soldiers after his removal from Mukhtiyarship. Pradhan asserts that administrative system of Nepal was people-centric and upward mobility. Most of the Thapa Bharadars (courtiers) were appointed before 1816 and there was no monopoly of any single family in the inner circle of court. Similarly, Pradhan explains that there was no monopoly of Bhimsen because the regulations were all issued in the name of Maharaja. Historian Chittaranjan Nepali in his 1956 book Janaral Bhimsen Thapa Ra Tatkalin Nepal argued that Bhimsen was as powerful as Prime Minister Jung Bahadur Rana but he never initiated any rolls of Succession to hereditary premiership within his family like Jung Bahadur did. Resident Hodgson, one of the arch rivals who brought the downfall of Bhimsen, ultimately expressed tribute to Bhimsen on 30 July 1839 and went on to laud Bhimsen as one of the most able contemporary statesman in all of native South Asian states beside Ranjit Singh. British historian Henry Ambrose Oldfield contended that Bhimsen was extremely concerned about the independence of his country "Nothing was nearer and dearer to his heart than the independence of his country". Historian Ludwig Stiller considered Bhimsen as a mere politician than a ruler and criticizes the excessive positive or negative representation used by Bhimsen's primary biographers: Historian Chittaranjan Nepali who "lionized him" and Historian Baburam Acharya who labelled him as a "mere schemer". He contends that despite being a powerful historical personality for three decades, Bhimsen was a mere politician of the court for the most portion of his period and his power was limited. Thus, he contends that Bhimsen used to negotiate and convince other courtiers to capitalize the political crisis into his advantage.

Nepalese-Canadian author Manjushree Thapa had written a column about him. She wrote:

He did not succeed in the 1814–16 war with the British, but the Thapas love him nonetheless because he tried so hard to control those pesky imperialists, overseeing military battles and negotiating treaties himself while trying to beat down Hodgson.

=== Religious views ===
Historian Baburam Acharya attributes the below idea to be of Bhimsen Thapa in the letter of then-minor King Girvan Yuddha Bikram Shah to Kaji Ranajor Thapa dated May 1814 (Sunday Jestha Sudi 4, 1871 Bikram Samvat);

One is born in this world in order to undergo the fruits of actions performed in past life. After the fruits of such actions are undergone, the soul is separated from the body. It then departs to another world to undergo the fruits of actions performed by it during its residence in the body. This is the way of the world.

— King Girvan's letter to Kaji Ranjor Thapa by Baburam Acharya

=== Physical appearance ===
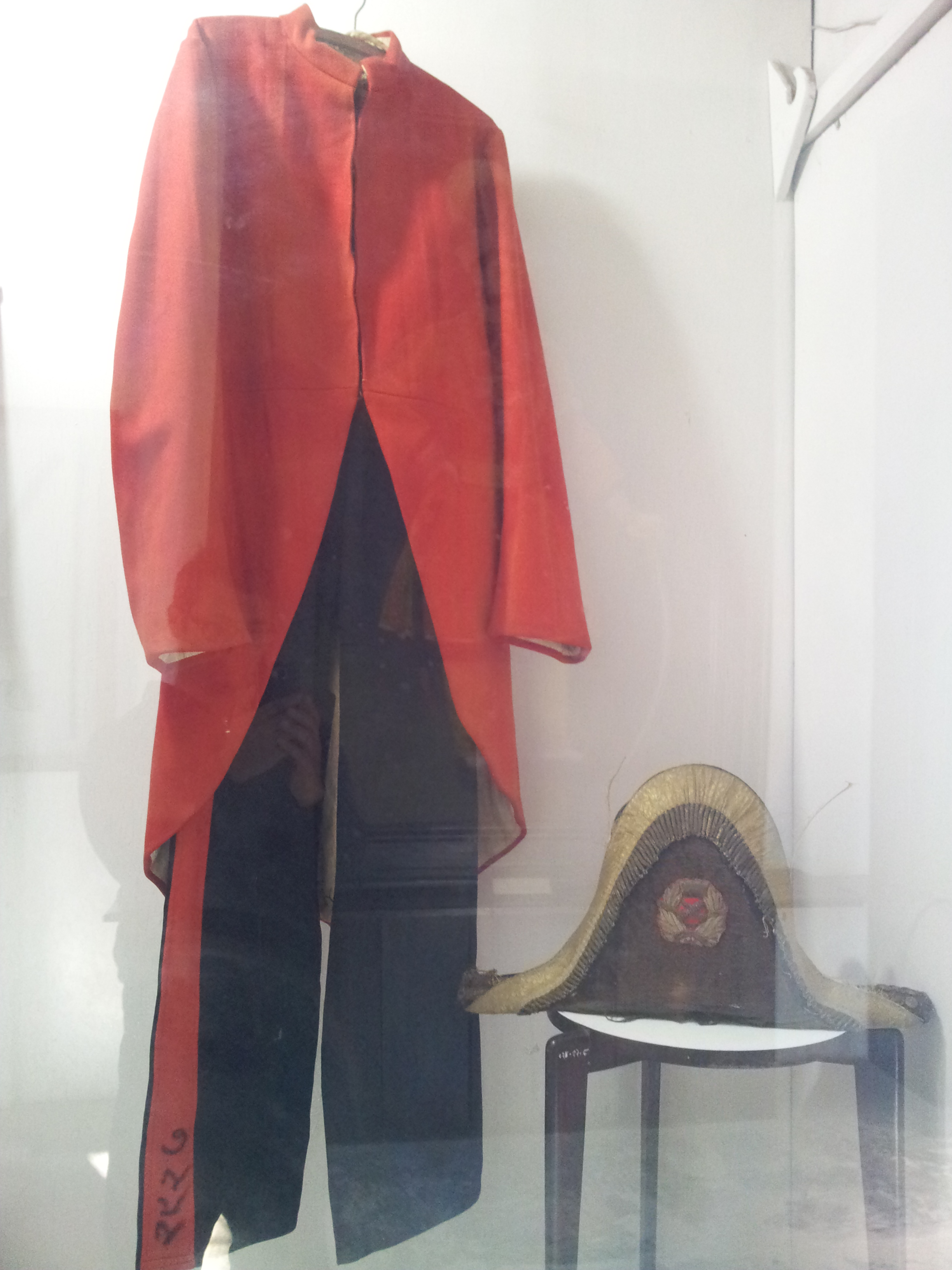
Military suit of Bhimsen at Chhauni National Museum of Nepal depicting his physical stature

Historian Chittaranjan Nepali described Bhimsen as a tall-statured person with an impressive physical personality.

=== Memorials and tributes ===
There is a park dedicated to him constructed in the Gorkha Municipality called Bhimsen Park. It is in two kilometers walk from Gorkha Darbar. The park constitutes 3 ropani of land and was used by descendants of Thapa dynasty for ritual purposes in the Dashain festival.

The Bhimsen Thapa Memorial Day is celebrated on 25 July. Historian John Whelpton was awarded the 2018 Bhimsen Thapa Memorial Award by the Bhimsen Thapa Memorial Foundation on the 243rd Bhimsen Thapa Memorial Day in Kathmandu.

=== Cultural depictions ===
Nepalese playwright Balkrishna Sama wrote a play on him named Bhimsen Ko Antya which went on to receive the 2029 Bikram Samvat (c.1972-1973 CE) Sajha Purashkar. The historical biography of Bhimsen written by historian Chittaranjan Nepali went on to receive the 2013 Bikram Samvat (c.1956-1957 CE) Madan Puraskar in the sociology category.

=== Popular legends ===
Historian Chittaranjan Nepali states that there were some widespread folk legends about Bhimsen. On 28 June 1955, he had an interaction with General Kaiser Shumsher Jung Bahadur Rana who foretold one of the legends about Bhimsen prevalent in then Nepalese society. The folk legend stated that Bhimsen had cursed then King of Nepal with a fate to consume from a Mana vessel (Nepali: भरेको माना खानुपर्नेछ). Another folk legend stated that the corpse of Bhimsen suddenly disappeared from the place of his death; the descendants of Chautariya Fatte Jang Shah had kept the hands while the skull was kept in some secret location in London. Furthermore, it was also widely believed that the family of Fatte Jang annually worships the preserved physical remains of Bhimsen.

== Gallery ==
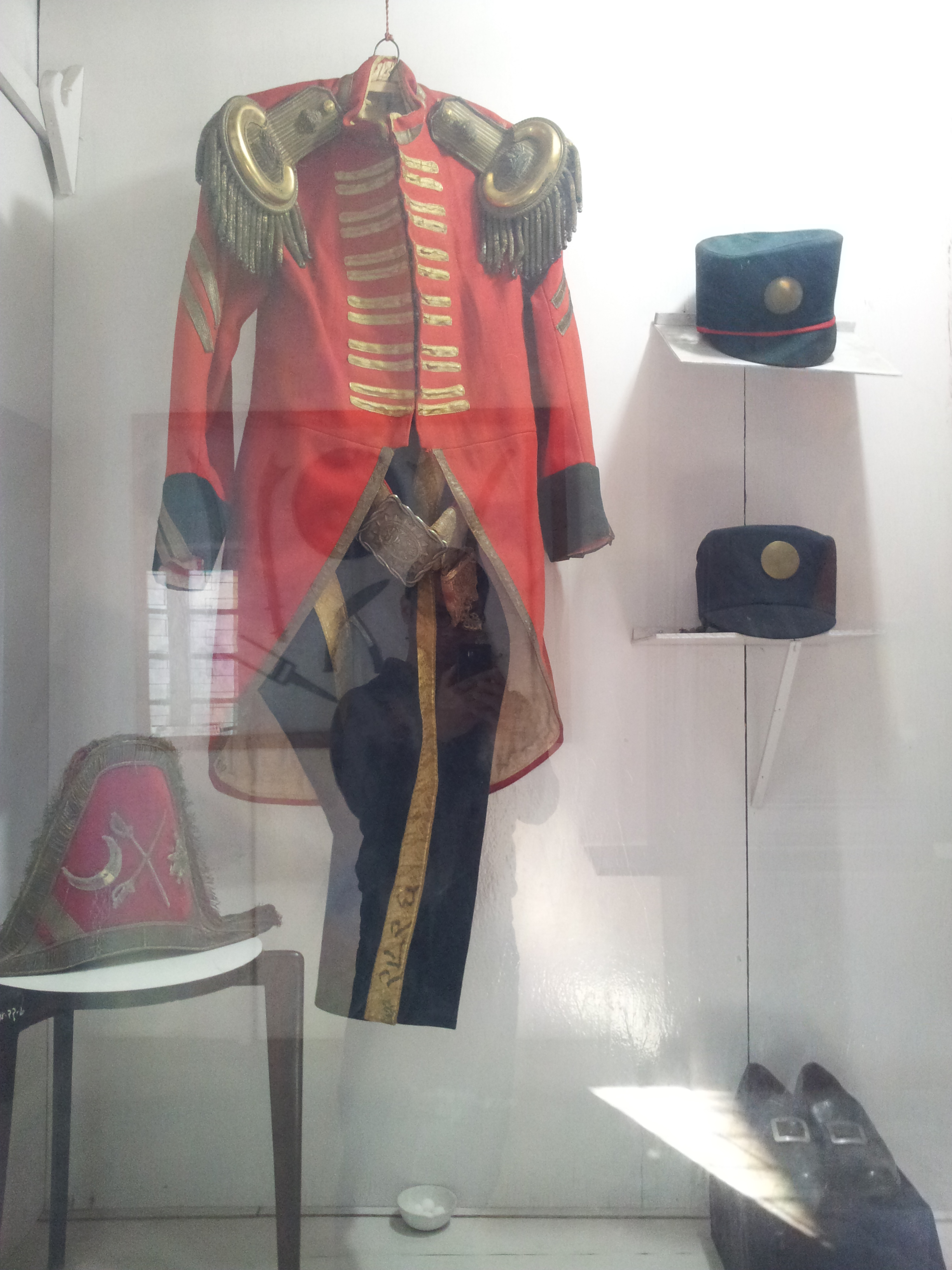
Clothes worn by Mukhtiyar Bhimsen Thapa

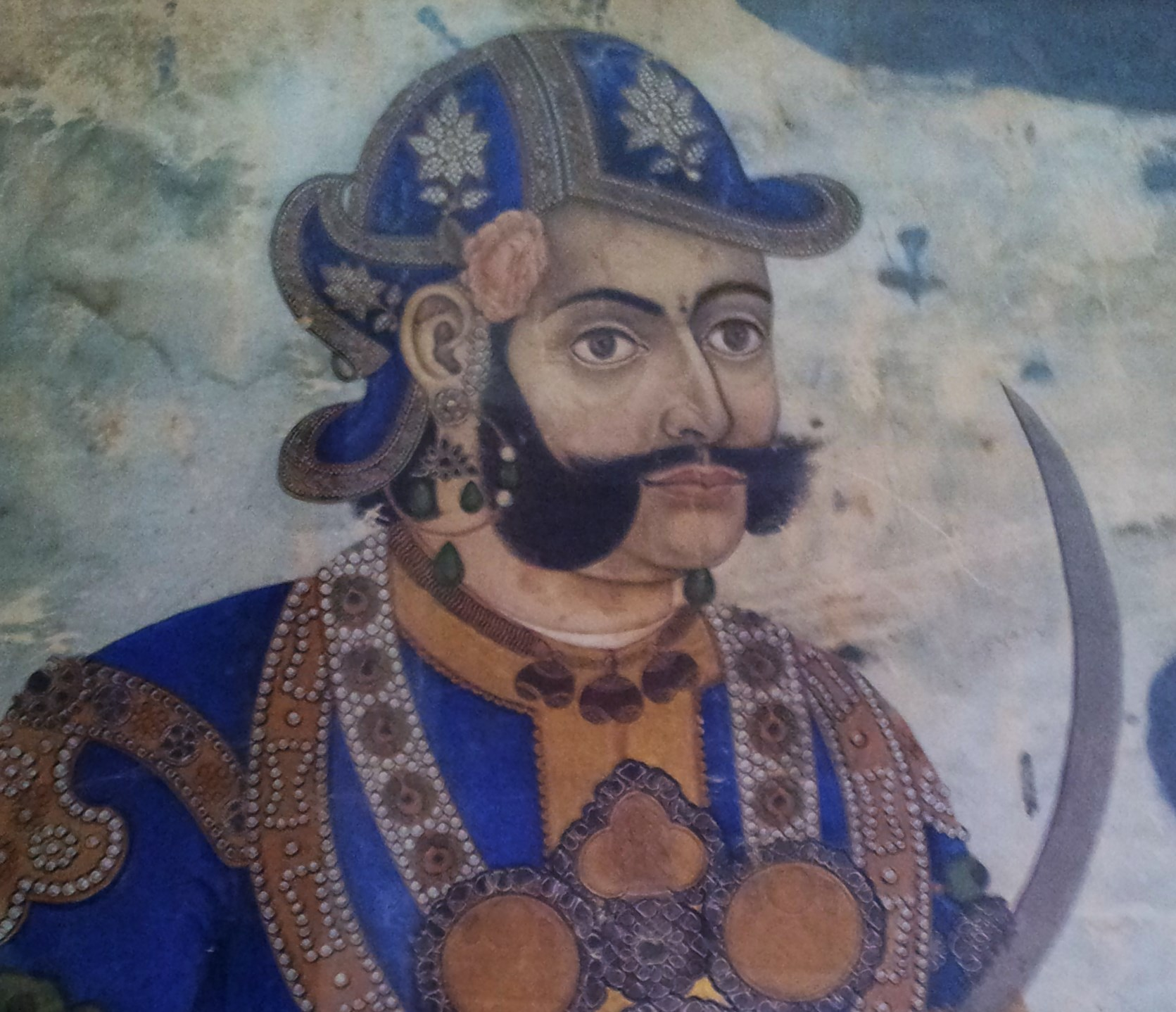
Portrait of Bhimsen's godson and nephew later Prime Minister Mathabar Singh Thapa in style of his uncle Bhimsen

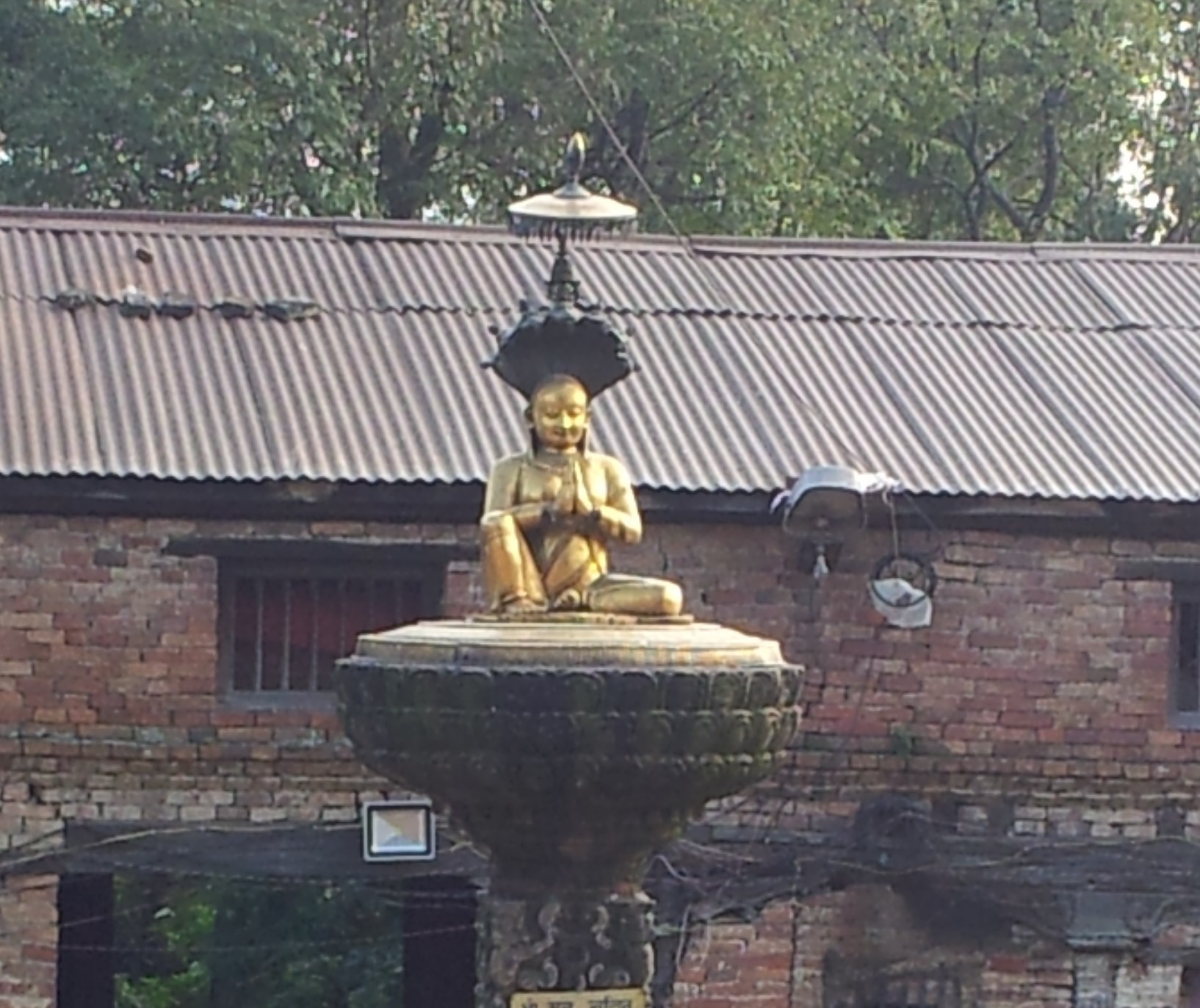
Statue of Queen Tripurasundari, Bhimsen's niece and biggest supporter

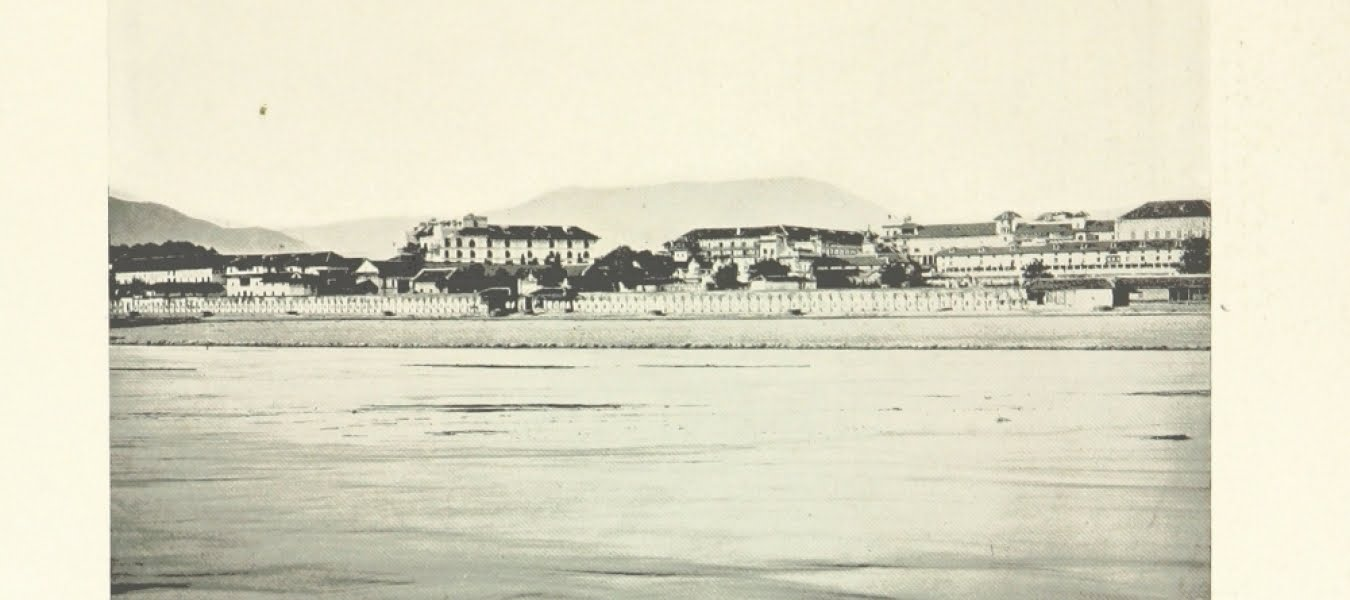
Thapathali Durbar complex, residence of Bhimsen Thapa between (1798–1804) when he was a Hajuriya (advisor and secretary to king)

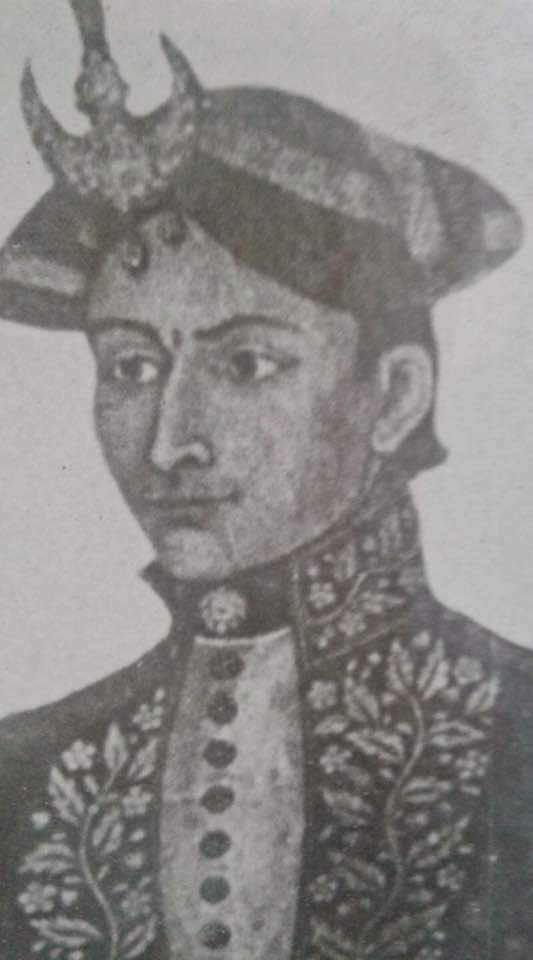
Portrait of Ujir Singh Thapa, Bhimsen's warrior nephew

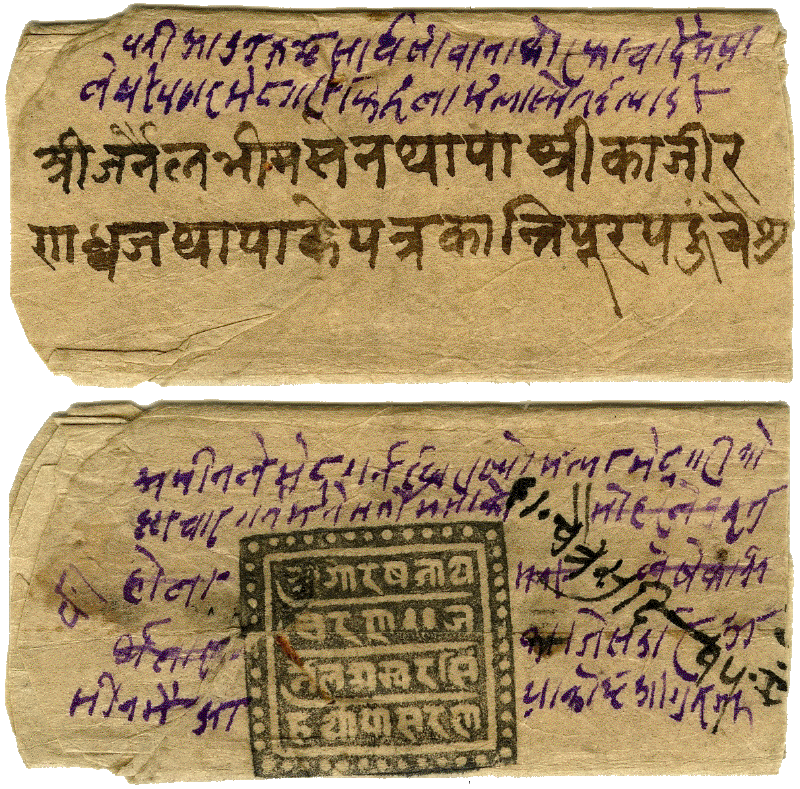
Letter received by Mukhtiyar (PM) Bhimsen Thapa and 2nd Kaji (Deputy PM) Ranadhoj Thapa sent by Bada Kaji Amar Singh Thapa's letter signed by his private black seal

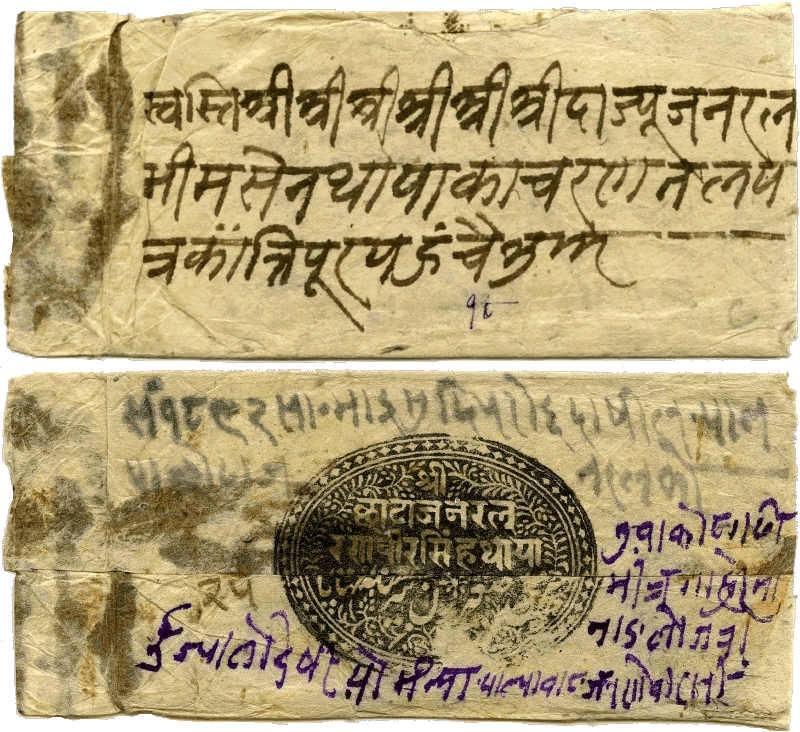
Letter received by Mukhtiyar (PM) Bhimsen Thapa and 2nd Kaji (Deputy PM) Ranadhoj Thapa sent by Kaji Ranabir Singh Thapa's letter signed by his private black seal

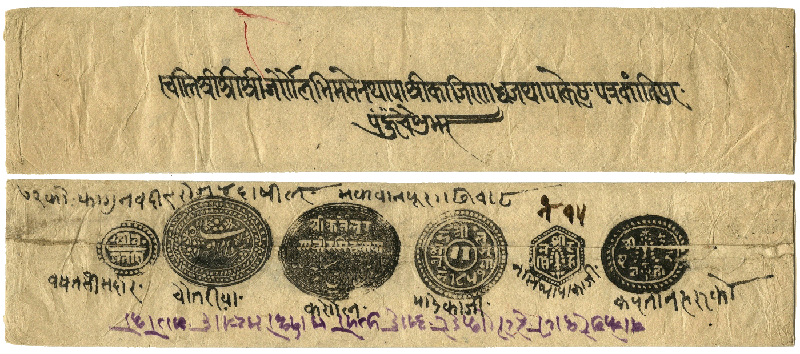
Letter received by PM Bhimsen Thapa and Kaji Ranadhoj Thapa sent by (Pvt. seal L to R) Bakhat Singh Sardar, Dalbhanjan Pande (Pande Kaji), Ranabir Singh Thapa, Kaji Narsingh Thapa (Elder Amar Singh Thapa's another son) and sundry captains

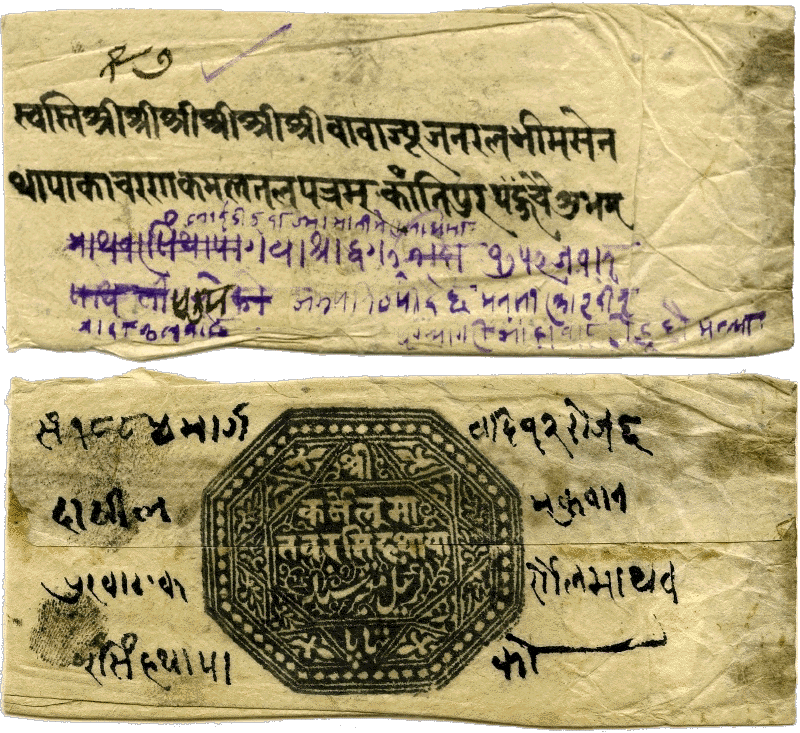
Letter sent to PM Bhimsen Thapa and Kaji Ranadhoj Thapa by then Colonel Mathabar Singh Thapa

== Notes ==
Political offices
Preceded by Rana Bahadur Shah	Mukhtiyar of Gorkha Empire; 1806–1837	Succeeded by Rana Jang Pande
Military offices
Preceded by Damodar Pande	Pradhan Senapati of the Nepalese Army; 1811–1835	Succeeded by Bhimsen Thapa as Commander-In-Chief of the Nepalese Army
Preceded by position created	Commander-In-Chief of the Nepalese Army; 1835–1837	Succeeded by Rajendra Bikram Shah
