= Family of Amar Singh Thapa =

Family of Amar Singh Thapa (Elder)
- Nishankalika flag of Bagale Thapa clan, Amar Singh’s ancestral clan
- Current region: Gorkha & Kathmandu
- Earlier spellings: Bagale Thapa
- Origin: Siranchowk, Gorkha
- Members: Bhim Singh Thapa Bagh; Amar Singh Thapa; Ranadhoj Thapa; Ranjore Thapa; Narsingh Thapa; Arjun Singh Thapa; Bhupal Singh Thapa; Ripumardan Thapa; Surath Singh Thapa
- Connected members: Balbhadra Kunwar; Chandrabir Kunwar; Jharana Thapa
- Connected families: Kunwar family
- Traditions: Kshatriya (Chhetri)
- Estate: Siranchowk of Gorkha
- Bagh Bhim Singh Thapa was the first national military commander of this family.

The family of Badakaji Amar Singh Thapa (Note: Not to be confused with the Amar Singh Thapa (born 1759).) (1751 - 1816) was a noble Chhetri family in the central politics of Kingdom of Nepal as well as former military aristocracy of the Gorkha Kingdom. The family of Bhimsen Thapa and the family of Amar Singh Thapa were two Bagale Thapa families and part of the larger Thapa caucus at the central politics of the Kingdom of Nepal.

The patriarch of this family was Ranjai Thapa of Siranchowk whose son Bagh Bhim Singh Thapa became a military commander of the Gorkha Kingdom and died in the battle of Palanchowk. Bhim Singh's son and the most prominent member of this family, Amar Singh Thapa went on to become the overall commander (in capacity of Mukhtiyar) of Kumaon, Garhwal and its West region in the Kingdom of Nepal. Amar Singh's sons and grandsons were influential Bharadars (state-bearing officers), politicians, ministers and military commanders in the Kingdom of Nepal. The family was also maritally connected with the Kunwar family of Gorkha. Amar Singh Thapa was the father-in-law of Chandrabir Kunwar, the nephew of Gorkhali Sardar Ramakrishna Kunwar. Through Chandrabir, Amar Singh had grandsons of national recognition; Balbhadra Kunwar, a famed warrior of the Battle of Nalapani and Birbhadra Kunwar, a Bharadar (state bearing officer).

== Significance ==
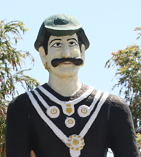
Bada Kaji Amar Singh Thapa, Overall Commander of Western region of Kingdom of Nepal

This family was another influential Bagale Thapa family serving in the royal court with Bhimsen Thapa family, due to their consolidation of power in the central authority. Bhimsen Thapa, also a member of Bagale Thapa clan, added the sons of Amar Singh Thapa in the royal court to increase the influence of Thapa caucus.

== Immediate family ==
=== Children ===
Nepali historian Surya Bikram Gyawali contends that he was married to Dharmabati and had 9 sons namely: Surbir, Randhoj, Ran Singh, Ranjor, Bhakta Bir, Ram Das, Narsingh, Arjun Singh and Bhupal. He further states that all the sons of Amar Singh contributed to the unification of Nepal. Bada Amar Singh had ten sons from four wives as per the Thapa genealogy: Ranabir, Ranasur, Ranadhoj, Ranabhim, Ranajor, Bhaktabir, Ramdas, Narsingh, Arjun Singh, and Bhupal Singh. The Office of the Nepal Antiquary also mentions sons of Amar Singh as Ranajor, Bhaktavir, Ramdas, Ranasur, Ranabir, Arjun, Narsingh and Bhupal. The genealogical table produced by Kumar Pradhan shows the sons of Bada Amar Singh as - Ranadhoj, Bhaktabir, Narsingh, Ramdas and Ranajor, all of whom were Kaji at some point.

==== Ranadhoj Thapa ====
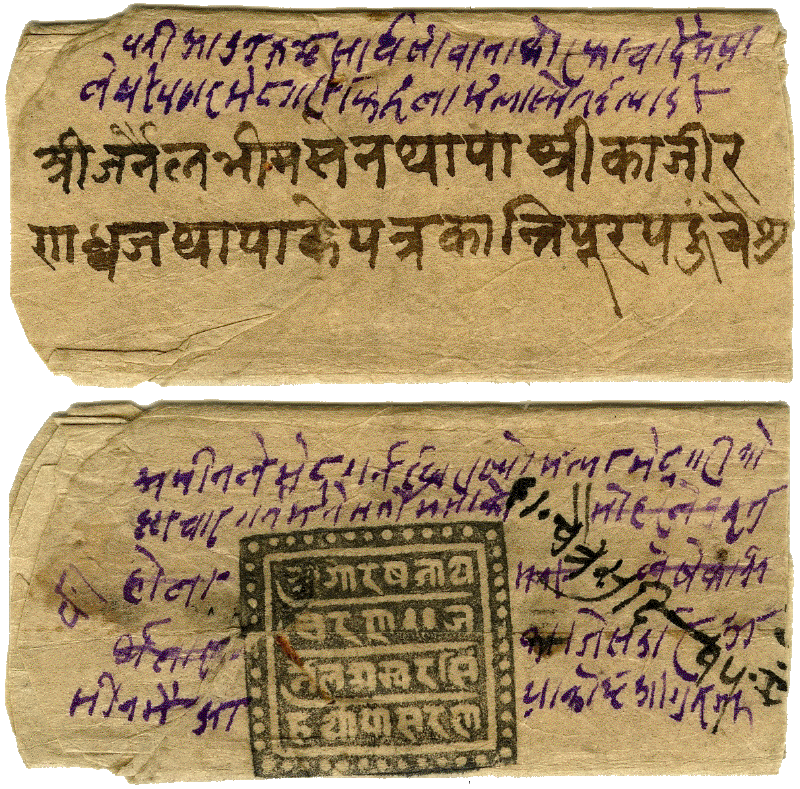
Outer cover of letter sent by Badakaji Amar Singh Thapa to PM Bhimsen Thapa and his own son Ranadhoj Thapa in Kantipur (Kathmandu)

Ranadhoj Thapa was deputy Prime Minister of Nepal during the administration of Prime Minister Bhimsen Thapa. As per Historian Dilli Raman Regmi, he was the eldest son of Bada Kaji Amar Singh Thapa, supreme commander of Western front. He was functioning deputy to Mukhtiyar (Prime Minister) during the well known Anglo-Nepalese war. Mukhtiyar Bhimsen Thapa had to share administrative authority with him. He retired as Kaji of Nepal in the year 1831 A.D.

==== Ranajor Thapa ====
He was governor of Kumaun and Garhwal and commander of Jaithak Fort during Anglo-Nepalese war at Battle of Jaithak. He was born to General Bada Kaji Amar Singh Thapa.

==== Arjun Singh Thapa ====
Arjun Singh Thapa referred as Arjan Singh was a son of Amar Singh and a military Captain. He took retirement in 1838 and returned to Nepal.

==== Bhupal Singh Thapa ====
Bhupal Singh Thapa was a son of Amar Singh. In April 1840, Bhupal Singh Thapa who was in command of Nepalese troops at Doti. He was ordered to lead a diplomatic mission to Lahore.

=== Grandchildren ===
The number of grandchildren of Amar Singh is unknown. However, some of his grandsons were prominent in Nepalese politics, administration and military commandership. His grandson through Ranadhoj Thapa were Ripu Mardan Thapa and Badal Singh Thapa, who also served as Kaji of Nepal. His another grandson, Surat Singh Thapa, was appointed to post of Kaji in 1832 A.D. to retaliate growing Darbar politics after which he became joint-chief signatory in each government papers with Mukhtiyar Bhimsen Thapa. His grandsons through daughter Ambika Devi and son-in-law Chandravir Kunwar were influential Bharadars too. Balabhadra Kunwar, son of Chandravir and national hero of the Battle of Nalapani, was a grandson of Amar Singh. Similarly, Birbhadra Kunwar, a military commander in Kumaun, was also grandson of Amar Singh through Chandravir.

==== Ripu Mardan Thapa ====
Ripu Mardan Thapa was a commander of Anglo-Nepalese war at Battle of Nalapani. He fought alongside his cousin Balbhadra Kunwar, another grandson of Bada Amar Singh. He sustained an injury in his right arm from an enemy shell. He was later appointed as Commander of a military company in Bhirkot.

==== Balbhadra Kunwar ====
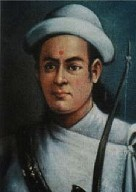
Balabhadra Kunwar, son of Chandravir and hero of the Battle of Nalapani

Balbhadra Kunwar (30 January 1789 – 13 March 1823) was a Nepalese military commander who popularly led the Battle of Nalapani. Balabhadra Kunwar was highly praised for his military skill for the defence of the Nalapani fort.

==== Birbhadra Kunwar ====
Birbhadra Kunwar was military commander in Kumaun and Kangra front (1809 A.D.) as well as governor of Garhwal.

== Ancestry ==
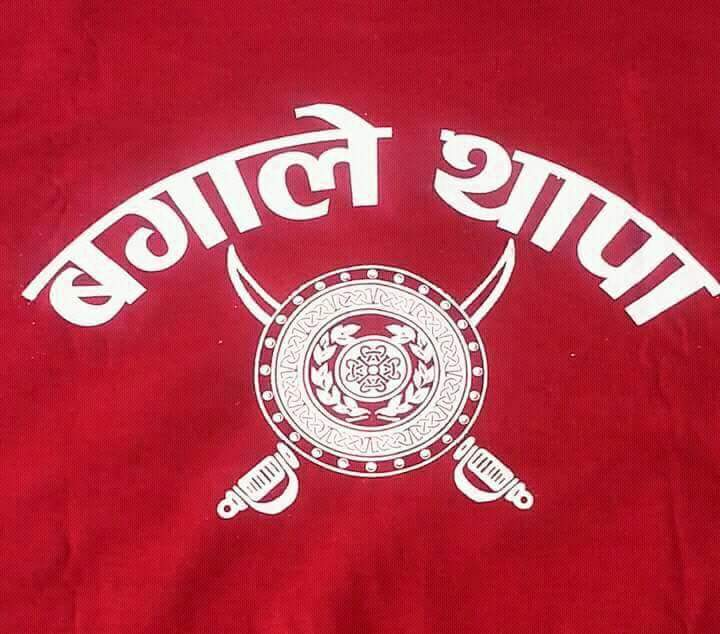
Coat of arms of Bagale Thapa clan

He was a member of Bagale Thapa clan.

=== Parents ===
Amar Singh's father Bhim Sen, also known as Umrao Bagh Bhim Singh Thapa was a military commander who died in the battle of Palanchowk in 1759 AD. He is also known as Tiger of Siranchowk. His mother as per the Thapa genealogy is Uma Devi.

=== Grandparents ===
Amar Singh was grandson of Ranjai [of Sirhanchowk].

=== Genealogical table ===
The Thapa genealogy mentions following ancestors of Amar Singh:

16. Anirudra Thapa
8. Dhanjai Thapa
4. Ranjai Thapa
2. Bhim Singh Thapa
1. Amar Singh Thapa
3. Uma Devi

== Other relatives ==
=== Chandrabir Kunwar ===
Chandrabir Kunwar married a sister of Kaji Ranajor Thapa and was a son-in-law of Bada Amar Singh Thapa Chandra Bir was appointed as Subba (i.e. governor) of Pyuthan in around 1844/45 Vikram Samvat., governor of hill, Madhesh and Bhot divisions of Doti region 1864 V.S. and Subba (governor) of one-third territories of Garhwal on 1862 Vikram Samvat.

== Later Descendants ==
Jharana Thapa, a popular Nepalese actress is married to Sunil Thapa, an eighth patrilineal descendant of Bada Kaji Amar making their daughter Suhana Thapa ninth descendant.
