= Thapa family (disambiguation) =

Thapa family may refer to:

- Thapa dynasty or Thapa family, family of Bhimsen Thapa, the most significant political family
- Family of Amar Singh Thapa (Elder)
  - Amar Singh Thapa (father)
  - Ranadhoj Thapa (son)
  - Ranajor Singh Thapa (son)
- Family of Surya Bahadur Thapa
  - Surya Bahadur Thapa (father)
  - Sunil Bahadur Thapa (son)
- Family of Bhekh Bahadur Thapa
  - Bhekh Bahadur Thapa (father)
  - Bhaskar Thapa (son)
  - Manjushree Thapa (daughter)
- Family of Kamal Thapa
  - Kamal Thapa (brother)
  - Ganesh Thapa (brother)
- Family of Bhakti Thapa
  - Bhakti Thapa (patron)
  - Arjun Bahadur Thapa (descendant)

== See also ==
- Thapa (disambiguation)
