= Bhim Singh Thapa =

Nepalese commander (died 1759)

Umrao Bagh Bhim Singh Thapa
- उमराव बाघ भीमसिंह थापा

Personal details
- Born: Gorkha Kingdom
- Died: 1759 Palanchowk, Nepal
- Spouse: Uma Devi
- Relations: Family of Amar Singh Thapa and Bagale Thapa
- Children: Amar Singh Thapa
- Parent: Ranjai of Sirhanchowk (father)
- Relatives: Ranadhoj Thapa (grandson); Ranajor Singh Thapa (grandson)
- Nickname: Bagh Buda

Military service
- Battles/wars: Unification of Nepal

Bhim Singh Thapa (Nepali: भीमसिंह थापा; sometimes known as Bagh Bhimsen Thapa) was a Nepalese Umrao (equivalent to a commander) who was active during the Unification of Nepal.

Thapa was also known by the title Bagh (meaning: Tiger). His son Amar Singh Thapa is known as one of the national heroes of Nepal.

He died in 1759 at the Battle of Palanchok.
