= Bagale Thapa =

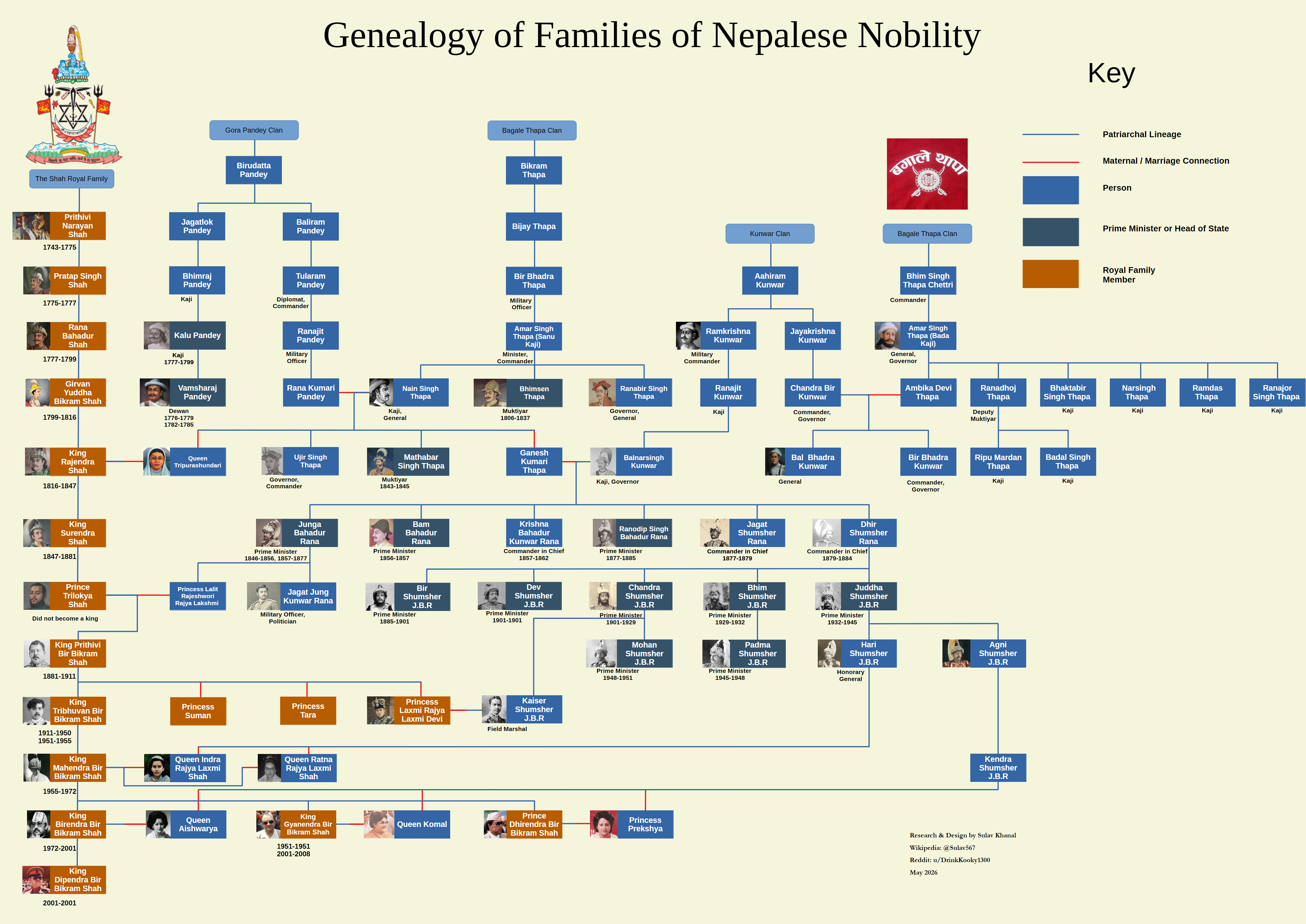
The relation between the Thapa, Kunwar, Rana, Pandey, and Shah families of Nepal showcasing the transfer of power throughout the history of Nepal.

== Ethnicity of Bagale Thapa ==
The surname Bagale Thapa is historically associated with the Khas Chhetri ethnic group, specifically the Bagale sub-caste, which is one of the indigenous communities of Nepal. The Khas Chhetri people are known for their prominent role in Nepal's military and political history, and the Bagale sub-caste is particularly noted for its leadership in these areas.

== Origins ==
=== Bagale Thapa genealogy ===
Bagale Thapa Bansawali

The progenitor of Bagale Thapas from the Bagale Thapa genealogy

....श्री शाकेः ।। ११११ सम्वत् १२४६ साल देषि थापाहरूका सन्तति कुलका आदि कालु थापा हुनः ।। १ ।। कालु थापाका चेला ४ जेठा पुन्याकर थापाः ।। माहिँला तारापति थापाः ।। साहिँला विरु थापाः ।। कान्छा धर्मराज थापाः ।। पुलामका जेठा हुनः ।। ताकमका माहिँला हुनः ।। जमरिकका कान्छा जसोधर थापा (धर्मराज) हुनः तिनले जमरिकमा राज्य गर्याः ताहाँ देषि तिनी आयाका हुनः ।। २ ।।.....

— Bagale Thapa Vamsāwali (genealogy) part republished by Yogi Naraharinath

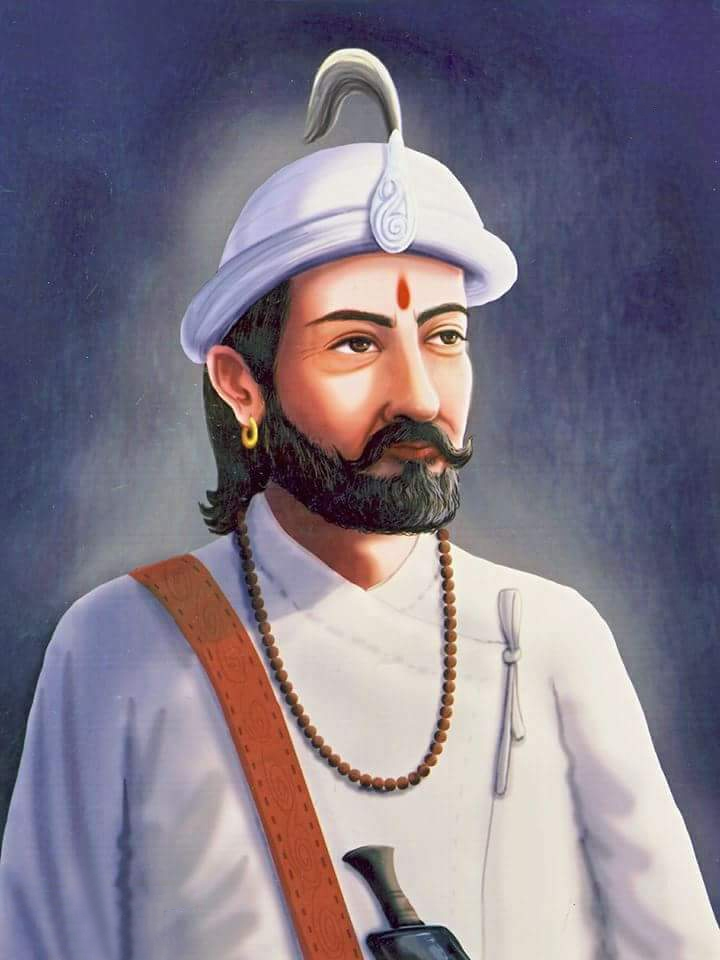
Maharaj Kalu Thapa Kshatri, male progenitor of all Bagale Thapas

The genealogy traces the lineage of all Bagale Thapas to a male progenitor (Mūlapuruṣa) Kalu Thapa Kshatri. The genealogy states that Kalu Thapa had four sons; Punyakar of Pulaam state, Tarapati of Takam state, Biru and Dharmaraj (Jashodhar) of Jamarik state. The genealogy describes that Kaalu adhered to the following sects: "Aatreya gotri Tripravara, Shukla Yajurveda, Dhanurveda and Madhyandini Shakha".

=== Kunwar family legend ===
Kunwar family legend mentions that their first ancestor Rāma Siṃha Rāṇā was married to a daughter of Raja (King) of Bīnātī, a Bagāle Kṣetrī on the request by his employer hill Raja. John Whelpton opines that the legend of the Kunwar family's origins, which says their progenitor to have entered hill and married a daughter of Bagale Kshetri, might have linked their family to the Bagale Thapa, a clan of the Mukhtiyar Bhimsen Thapa.

== History ==
Nishankalika Flag of Bagale Thapa clan used as War flag

Bagale Thapas belong to the Chhetri caste whose origin lies in Karnali region. Bagale Thapas were a powerful and prominent family at Jumla and seemed to have migrated eastwards.

=== Takam/Takamkot State ===
Takam State (1246-1545 B.S.) (1189-1488 CE) was used as an arsenal by the Bagale Thapa clan. In 1545 B.S. (1488 CE), King Dimba Bam Malla defeated these Thapas and annexed all the districts of Dhawalagiri Zone to create a bigger Parbat State. The Bagale Thapa clan of Takamkot established their arsenal in this Takamkot (Takam State) and controlled it between 1189 and 1488 CE, after which the Malla kings captured and controlled it from 1489 to 1825 CE.

=== Malla era Kathmandu ===
When Rajdev Malla was the king of the Kathmandu Valley in B.S. 1406, the Nawab of Bengal, Shamsuddin, launched an attack. At that time, Thapa Chhetris provided military assistance to King Rajdev and helped drive away the Muslim raiders. Pleased with this support, King Rajdev Malla granted residential settlements to the warriors of different castes involved in the battle, allowing them to live in specific areas. The place where Bagale Thapas settled came to be known as Thapathali, the area where Karkis settled was called Karkithok, and similar place names emergedIn the times of Malla rule at Kathmandu valley, Bagale Thapas were considered skillful at both warfare and administration. Thus, King Jagajjaya Malla attended the services of Kashiram Thapa, a leader of Bagale Thapas to control inobedient Khas and Magar citizens. His brother Parashuram Thapa, a commander of Bhaktapur Kingdom, sided to Gorkha Kingdom when Kashiram Thapa was killed without justification.

=== Noble families in Gorkha ===
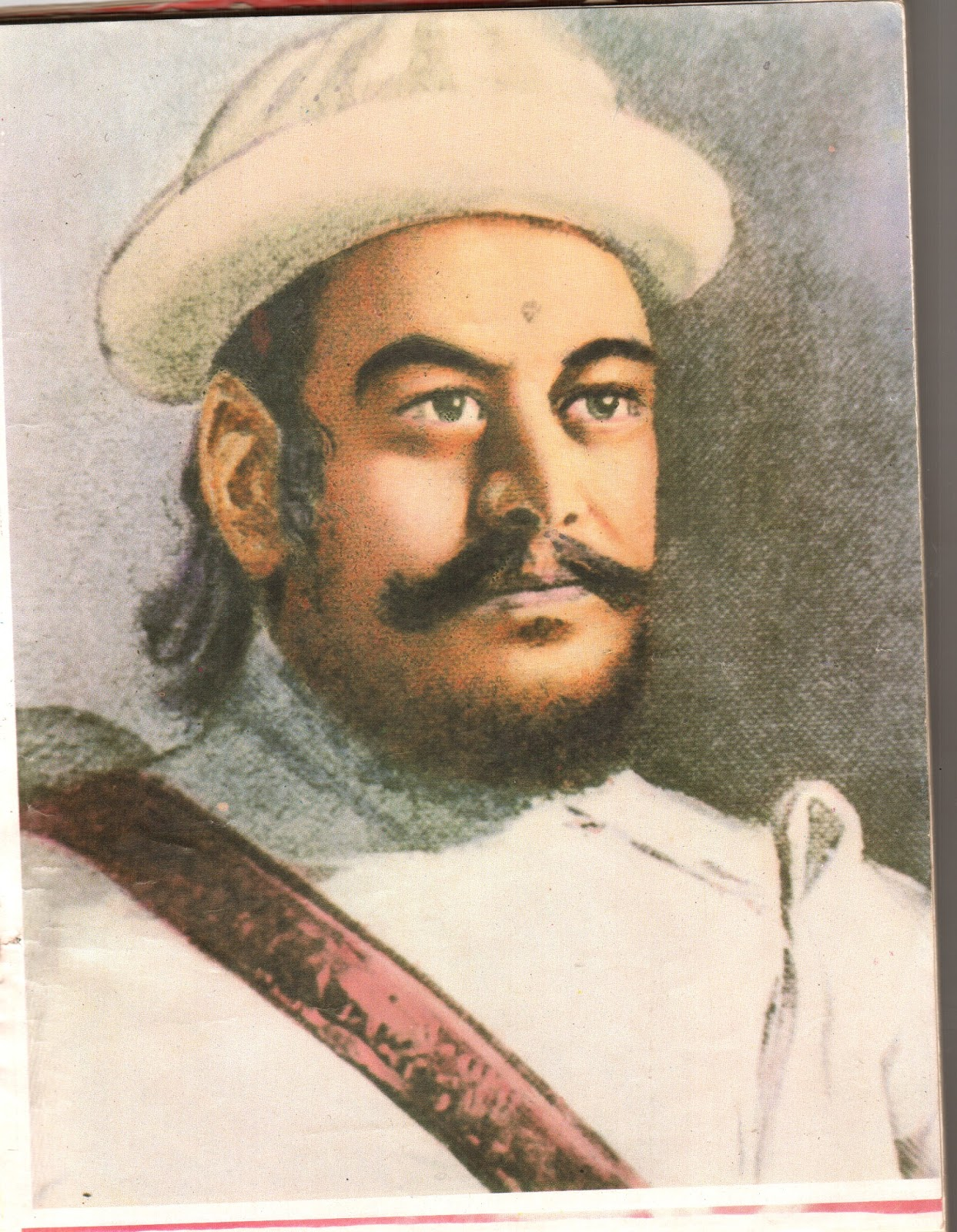
"Bada Kaji" Amar Singh Thapa, Military commander of Kingdom of Nepal

Family of Bhimsen Thapa and family of Amar Singh Thapa were two influential Bagale Thapa families at the central politics of Kingdom of Nepal.

The family of Bada Kaji Amar Singh Thapa consists Kaji Ranajor Singh Thapa, Ranadhoj Thapa, Narsingh Bahadur Thapa and their 2 more brothers who were also at Royal Court of Nepal. Amar Singh Thapa (Note: Bada Kaji Amar Singh Thapa is distinguished from Sardar Amar Singh Thapa, PM Bhimsen's father, by using terms Sanu (lesser) and Bada(greater)), one of the National heroes of Nepal and commander of Western front at Anglo-Nepalese war belonged to this clan.

The family of Kaji Bir Bhadra Thapa, commander of Unification of Nepal belonged to this clan. This family contains large number of renowned courtiers and warriors. He had three sons: Jeevan Thapa(died at Battle of Kirtipur), Bangsha Raj Thapa and Amar Singh Thapa (Sardar). The children of Amar Singh Thapa (Sardar) become influential. Prime Minister Bhimsen Thapa, the most revered among Thapas is the eldest son of Sardar Amar Singh Thapa(sanu). His nephew, son of Nain Singh Thapa, Mathabarsingh Thapa was the seventh Prime Minister of Nepal and niece, Nain's daughter was Queen Tripurasundari of Nepal. The family of Sardar Amar Singh Thapa resided at Bagh Durbar.

== Notable Bagale Thapas ==
- Amar Singh Thapa, Nepalese politician and administrator (Bada Kaji), Supreme Commander of Western front in Anglo-Nepalese War, one of the National heroes of Nepal
- Bhimsen Thapa, Nepalese Mukhtiyar (Prime Minister of Nepal), One of the National heroes of Nepal.
- Bir Bhadra Thapa, Gorkhali courtier and commander at Unification of Nepal
- Kashiram Thapa, Commander-in-Chief of Kantipur Kingdom
- Amar Singh Thapa (born 1759), Sino-Nepalese War veteran and father of Mukhtiyar Bhimsen Thapa
- Queen Tripurasundari of Nepal, (born as Lalita Sundari Thapa to Nain Singh Thapa), Queen Mother of Kingdom of Nepal
- Mathabar Singh Thapa, Nepalese politician, military general and Prime Minister of Nepal
- Ranadhoj Thapa, Nepalese politician and Deputy to Mukhtiyar Bhimsen Thapa
- Nain Singh Thapa, Nepalese politician and military general
- Ranajor Singh Thapa, Military Officer and Commander of Nahan Axis at Anglo-Nepalese War
- Ranabir Singh Thapa, Nepalese politician and Commander of Makwanpur Axis at Anglo-Nepalese War
- Bakhtawar Singh Thapa, Nepalese politician and Warrior at Anglo-Nepalese War
- Ujir Singh Thapa, Military Officer and Commander of Butwal Axis at Anglo-Nepalese War
- Dharmapaal Barsingh Thapa, Former Chief of the Nepalese Army
- Shailesh Thapa Chhetri, Former Inspector General of Police (Nepal)
- Deepak Thapa, Inspector General of Police (Nepal)

== Gallery ==
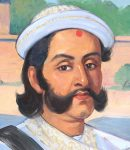
Portrait of Mathabar Singh Thapa in National Museum of Nepal, Chhauni

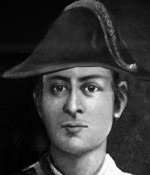
Portrait of Ujir Singh Thapa

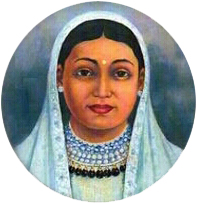
Portrait of Queen Tripurasundari of Nepal

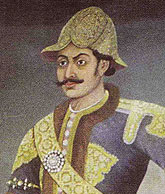
Bhimsen Thapa, Mukhtiyar of Nepal

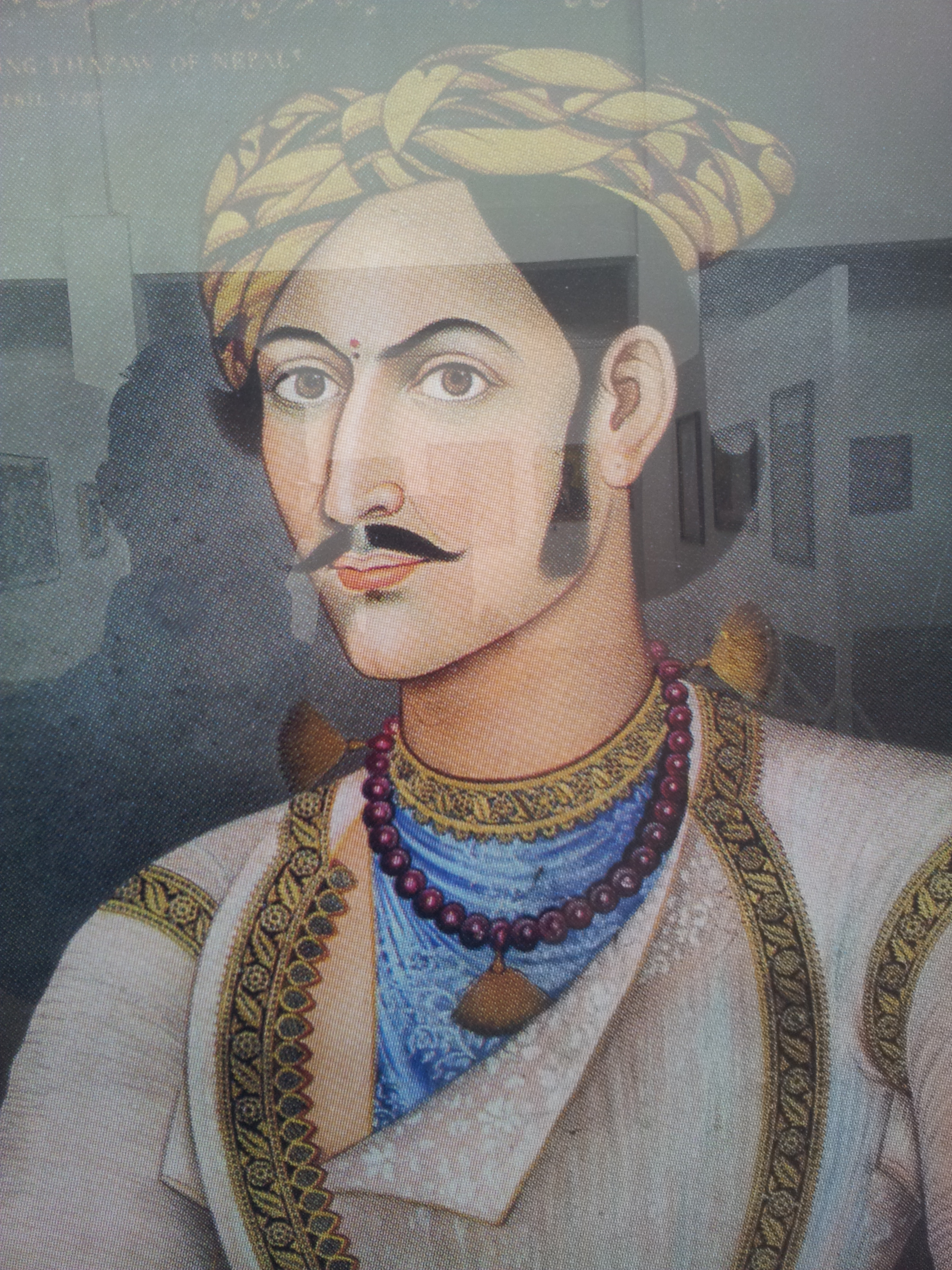
Portrait of Colonel Mathabar Singh Thapa

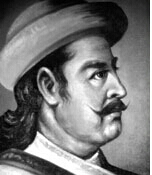
Kazee Nain Singh Thapa

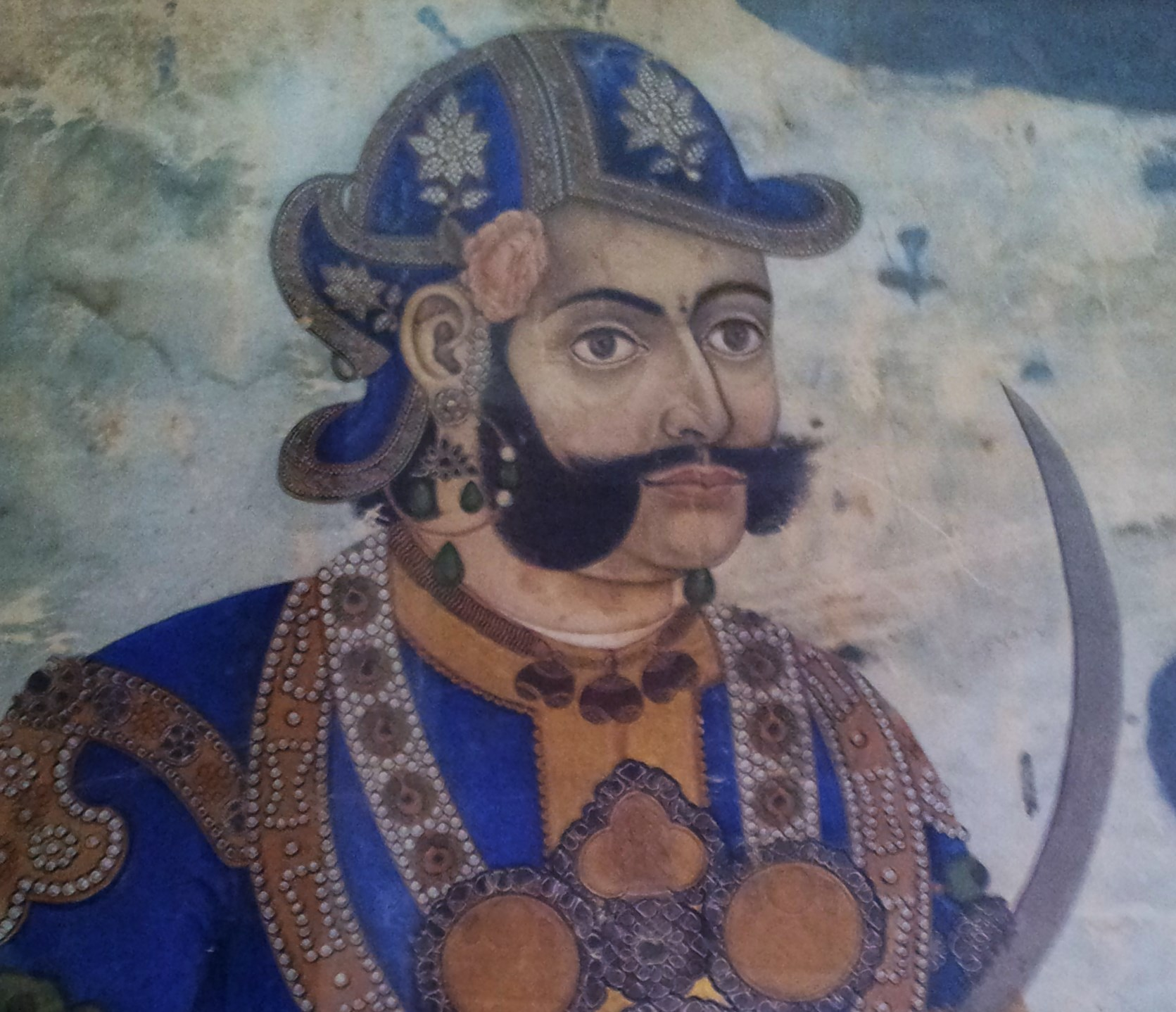
Mathabar Singh Thapa, a nobleman from Bagale Thapa clan

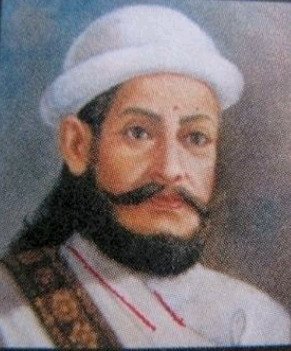
Amar Singh Thapa, nobleman from Bagale Thapa clan

== See also ==
- Basnyat
- Rana Dynasty
- Shah Dynasty
- Thapathana, place named after Bagale Thapas
