= Thapa (disambiguation) =

Thapa may refer to:

== Surname, clans and peoples ==
- Thapa, surname of Nepalese people of Chhetri and Magar castes
- List of people with surname Thapa
- Thapa Kaji, Thapas of Kshatriya dignity
- Bagale Thapa, Hindu Chhetri clan of Aatreya Gotra
- Thapa dynasty, 19th century ruling Thapa family

== Institutions and heritages ==
- Thapathali Campus, an engineering college
- Thapathali Durbar, Former Thapa palace

== Locations ==
- Thapapur, VDC at Kailali district
- Thapathana, VDC at Parbat district

== See also ==
- Thapar (disambiguation)
- Thapa family (disambiguation)
