= Balbhadra Kunwar =

National hero of Nepal (1789–1823)

Sardar Balbhandra Kunwar बलभद्र कुँवर
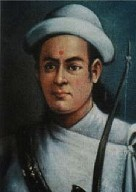
- Young Balbhadra Kunwar around Anglo-Nepal war

Personal details
- Born: 30 January 1789 Bhanwarkot, Kavre, Gorkha Empire (present-day Bhanwarkot, Panchkhal Kavrepalanchok District, Nepal)
- Died: 13 March 1823 (aged 34) Nowshera, Sikh Empire (present-day Nowshera, Khyber Pakhtunkhwa, Pakistan)
- Parents: Governor Chandrabir Kunwar (father); Ambika Devi Thapa (mother)
- Relatives: see Kunwar family see Family of Amar Singh Thapa see Rana dynasty
- Awards: National heroes of Nepal (posthumous)

Military service
- Allegiance: Kingdom of Nepal; Sikh Empire
- Rank: Captain (Nepali convention)
- Battles/wars: Anglo-Nepalese War

Balbhadra Kunwar (30 January 1789 – 13 March 1823) was a Gorkhali military General, Commander and administrator in the Sikh Empire and the Kingdom of Nepal. He was highly praised for his military skill for the defence of Nalapani fort in the Anglo-Nepalese War (1814–1816). He was a captain in the Nepalese military and was tasked as commander to protect the forts of Dehradun.

== Name ==
His given name Balabhadra is the name of Baladeva (Balarama), the elder brother of Krishna. It is an amalgamation of two words; Bala (Sanskrit: बल, lit. 'strength') and Bhadra (Sanskrit: भद्र, lit. 'auspicious')

== Family and early life ==
He was born to father Chandrabir Kunwar, a resident of Bhanwarkot of Panchkhal Municipality in Kavrepalanchowk District. His mother Ambika Devi was a sister of Kaji Ranajor Thapa and daughter of Bada Kaji Amar Singh Thapa. His father Chandrabir was son of Jaya Krishna Kunwar and grandson of Ashiram Kunwar. His brother Birabhadra Kunwar was military commander in Kumaun and Kangra front (1809 A.D.) as well as governor of Garhwal.

== The Anglo-Nepal War 1814–1816 ==
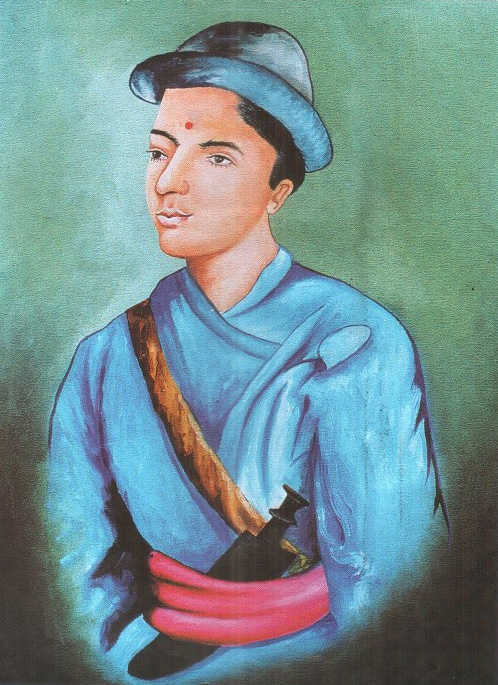
Balbhadra Kunwar

As commander of the Gorkhali forces in Dheradun, Capt. Balbhadra Kunwar was handed the responsibility of defending the area. The expanding Nepali/Gorkhali State had since the mid-late 18th century expanded the nation's border on all sides, which eventually led to conflict with the British East India Company and a war followed.

Realizing he could not defend the town of Dehradun, Capt. Balbhadra Kunwar withdrew to the strategic hill fort of Khalanga with an army strength of 600 including women and children against the British East India Company British stronghold of 3,000–3,500 troops. He turned down a proposal of the British who would make him Governor of the Western Garhwal should he surrender or leave Nepal.

"Go capture the fort that you could not win by war, but now we have left it at our own will".

In October 1814, Major General Sir Rollo Gillespie of the British army had advanced along with 3,500 troops and eleven pieces of cannon to occupy the Nepali territories situated between the Ganges and Yamuna rivers in the Gharwal and Kumaon regions that had been occupied by the Nepali forces. Captain Balabhadra Kunwar had maintained his position at a 400 cubits high hill in a place called Nalapani, situated north-east of Dehradun, to check his advance.

On Kartik 8, 1871, Bikram Samvat (October 1814), British troops reached Dheradun. A battle took place between British and Nepali troops at Nalapani on Kartik 10, 1871 B. Samvat. The British were unsuccessful and withdrew to Dehradun. Another battle was fought between the two sides at Nalapani on Kartik 17, 1871 Samvat (ca. Oct 31, 1814). General Gillespie, the British Commander, lost his life in that battle along with Col. Alice.

The siege continued for a month until the British, convinced that they could not win by military ways, blocked the source of water to the fort so that the Nepalese would die of thirst. For the Nepali Army it was a hard struggle fighting a very well equipped and trained modern army, belonging to one of the largest colonial Empires of the world. Balbhadra Kunwar had asked for reinforcements from the capital but Kathmandu could not send them any soldiers as the Nepali army had no reserve army and were an emerging power which means that they did not have troops to match the East India Company. The Nepalese army was outnumbered in Nalapani as it was in every battlefield.

Even though the Nepali army lacked water they were still determined to defend their position. Because the walls had collapsed, cannonballs fired by the British started reaching the interior of the fort. Many men were killed or injured. Despite losing their comrades and friends the remaining men were still determined to defend their position. In order to drink water from the river they came out of the fort in a single line, and the British forces watched in surprise as the Nepali troops quenched their thirst and returned to their fort.

On Marga 16 (Nov 1814), four of the commanders, including Capt. Balabhadra Kunwar, in the night was forced to abandon the fort of Nalapani with their remaining Gorkhali troops. On seeing the Nepalis abandon the fort, the British attacked them. The Nepalis resisted the attack but continued to advance. They reached Dwara in the morning of Marga 17, 1871 and stayed the whole day there.

Balabhadra sent a courier to the British with the following message: We had handed over to you your dead and injured soldiers on your request. We now request you to hand over our injured soldiers to us. The British replied that they would look after the injured (Nepali) soldiers themselves. Accordingly, they treated the 180 injured soldiers at the Nalapani fort.

The next day, Marga 18, 1871 Samvat, the Nepalis left Dwara for the Gopichand Hill, where they had decided to build a fort. Dwara was not considered suitable for that purpose.

The Nepalis spent the night at the Gopichand hill. At midnight, the British forces started shelling their camp. The Nepalis retaliated. Meanwhile, Sardar Ripumardan Thapa sustained an injury in his right arm from an enemy shell. He was unable to walk, and so was helped by his jamadar to climb the hill. However, he could not go on and was forced to stop. The other Nepalis continued to ascend the hill.

The next day, Marga 19, 1871 B. Samvat, men sent by Balabhadra carried Ripumardana to Chamuwa. Kaji Ranadipa Simha Basnyat also had arrived at that place. On Marga 20, Kaji Rewanta Kunwar reached there Subedar Dalajit Kanwar were killed by enemy fire.

Ultimately after 4 days of thirst, and a severe loss of troops, without surrendering, Capt. Balbhadra emerged from the fort with drawn kukris in his hands (along with other 70 survivors) and roared to the British – "You could have never won the battle but now I myself voluntarily abandon this fort. There is nothing inside the fort other than dead corpses of the children and women"! He and his remaining troops escaped into the hills on November 30, 1814.

A peace treaty was signed on Dec 2, 1815 between the then King Girvan Yuddha Vikram Shah and the British East India Company, known as the Sugauli Treaty.

== Under Maharaja Ranjit Singh ==
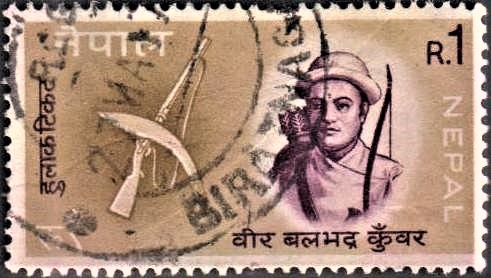
Stamp featuring Balbhadra

He did not lose his life during the Anglo-Nepalese war. After the war, he went to Lahore, capital of the Punjab where many Nepalis had gone, to join the two new regiments formed by the Sikh Maharajah Ranjit Singh of the Punjab, following the war with the British but a tradition formed prior to the war. Capt. Balbhadra Kunwar was appointed General and commander of the new "Goorkha" regiments consisting entirely of Gorkhali/Nepali troops. Those that had taken service under the Mughal Emperors were known as "Munglane" and was seen as very powerful.

=== Under Hari Singh Nalwa and death ===
During the Sikh-Afghan war of 1879 B. Samvat (1822), the Nepalis in the Sikh Military had fought bravely, but was also in which Balabhadra Kunwar was killed by Afghan artillery in Naushera, Peshawar region, Afghanistan on Chaitra 3 (March/April in the Roman calendar and is the last month in the Hindu Lunar calendar). Bhimsen Thapa had sent men to Lahore to collect information about this war and the death of his nephew. He was under the great and famed General Hari Singh Nalwa who honoured him during the battle. Hari Singh Nalwa continued the campaign and reached as far as Jamrud.

Following the Anglo-Nepali War, the British East India Company erected a war memorial at Nalapani in honor of the Gorkhalis and Capt. Balbhadra Kunwar (often referred to wrongly as Bulbuder Singh or Balbudder Thapa) praising their bravery.

== Books ==
- Prinsep, Henry Thoby (1825). History of the Political and Military Transactions in India During the Administration of the Marquess of Hastings, 1813–1823. Vol. 1. London: Kingsbury, Parbury & Allen. OCLC 152785969.
- Acharya, Baburam (January 1, 1971) [1950], "King Girban's Letter To Kaji Ranjor Thapa" (PDF), Regmi Research Series, 3 (1): 3–5
- Regmi, Mahesh Chandra (January 1, 1986a), "Royal Orders of Kartik Badi 1, 1865" (PDF), Regmi Research Series, 18 (1): 1–5
- Regmi, Mahesh Chandra (May 1, 1986b), "The Badrinath Temple" (PDF), Regmi Research Series, 18 (5): 75–76
- Regmi, Mahesh Chandra (December 1, 1986c), "Subba Chandrabir Kanwar of Doti" (PDF), Regmi Research Series, 18 (12): 185–186
- Dabaral, Shiva Prasad ‘’Charan’’ (February 1987a), "The Rape of Garhwal" (PDF), Regmi Research Series, 19 (2): 25–30
- Regmi, Mahesh Chandra (April 1987a), "Garhwal Appointment, A.D. 1805" (PDF), Regmi Research Series, 19 (4): 46–48
- Dabaral, Shiva Prasad ‘’Charan’’ (April 1987b), "From the Yamuna to the Sutlej" (PDF), Regmi Research Series, 19 (4): 50–54
- Regmi, Mahesh Chandra (September–October 1987b), "Gorkhali Rule in Garhwal" (PDF), Regmi Research Series, 19 (9–10): 143–150
- Regmi, Mahesh Chandra (April 1988a), "Miscellaneous Documents of Marga Sudi 1, 1865" (PDF), Regmi Research Series, 20 (4): 46–47
- Regmi, Mahesh Chandra (April 1988b), "The Kalidatta Company" (PDF), Regmi Research Series, 20 (4): 56–57
- Regmi, Mahesh Chandra (June–July 1988c), "Religious Endowments in Kumaun and Garhwal" (PDF), Regmi Research Series, 20 (6–7): 76–78
