= Amar Singh Thapa =

Military general, governor and warlord in Nepal

Sri Bada Kaji Jarnel Amar Singh Thapa
- श्री बडाकाजी जर्नेल अमरसिंह थापा
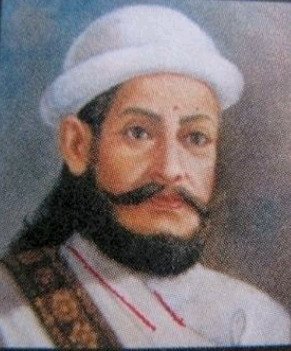
- Portrait of Bada (Elder) Amar Singh Thapa Chhetri

Personal details
- Born: 1751 C.E. (1808 B.S.) Sirhanchowk, Gorkha District
- Died: 1816 C.E. Gosain Kunda, Rasuwa District
- Relations: see Family of Amar Singh Thapa see Kunwar family
- Parents: Bagh Bhim Singh Thapa Chhetri (father); Uma Devi (mother)
- Awards: National heroes of Nepal (posthumous)
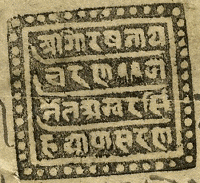
- Signature
- Nickname(s): Living Lion of Nepal; Bada Kaji; Budha Kaji

Military service
- Allegiance: Gorkha Kingdom; Kingdom of Nepal
- Branch/service: Nepalese Army
- Rank: General
- Commands: Supreme Commander of Western front
- Battles/wars: Anglo-Nepalese war, Battles of unification of Nepal, reinforced at 2nd Nepalese-Tibetan War

Amar Singh Thapa distinguished as Badakaji Amar Singh Thapa (Note: Bada Kaji Amar Singh Thapa was distinguished from Kaji Amar Singh Thapa (sana), Mukhtiyar Bhimsen Thapa's father, by terms Bada and Sana meaning elder and younger.) (Nepali: बडाकाजी अमर सिंह थापा), or Amar Singh Thapa The Elder, (also spelled Ambar Simha) also known by the honorific name Bada Kaji ("Senior Kaji") or Budha Kaji ("The Old Kaji"), was a Gorkhali military general, governor and warlord in the Kingdom of Nepal. He was the overall commander of the Nepal Army in the conquest of Western Provinces and authoritative ruler of Kumaon, Garhwal in the Kingdom of Nepal. He was referred by the King of Nepal to have been deployed as Mukhtiyar (equivalent to Prime Minister) of Western Provinces of Kumaon, Garhwal. He is often hailed as Living Tiger of Nepal (Nepali: ज्यूँदो बाघ; jyūm̐do bāgha) and led the Anglo-Nepalese War for the Gorkhali Army. Amarsingh Chowk Pokhara and Shree Amarsingh Model Higher Secondary School are named after Amar Singh Thapa.

== Early life and family ==
Nishankalika flag of Bagale Thapa clan, Bada Kaji Amar Singh's ancestral clan

He was grandson of Ranjai [of Sirhanchowk] and son of Bhim Sen known as Umrao Bagh Bhim Singh Thapa (Note: His father's name was Bhim Singh Thapa with personal title of Bagh (meaning: Tiger) in the administrative office of Umarao as per government gazettes while many historians as Kumar Pradhan wrote alternatively as Bhim Sen Thapa, the same name of Mukhtiyar of Nepal.), who commanded and died in the battle of Palanchowk in 1759 AD. He belonged to Bagale Thapa clan.

He was popularly named "Amar Singh Thapa (Bada)" to distinguish him from another Kaji Amar Singh Thapa (Sana), Mukhtiyar Bhimsen Thapa's father, by identifiers "Bada" and "Sana" meaning elder and younger. His family members were added to the Royal Court by Bhimsen Thapa, who was also a member of Bagale Thapa clan. His eldest son Ranadhoj Thapa was deputy to Mukhtiyar (Prime Minister) Bhimsen Thapa sharing the authority while other four sons namely – Bhaktabir Singh, Narsingh, Ramdas and Ranjore Singh, all of them were Kajis at some point. His youngest son Ranajor Singh Thapa fought with him in the Anglo-Nepalese War while his eldest son Ranadhoj Thapa, was vice to Mukhtiyar of Nepal. His grandson, young Surat Singh Thapa, was appointed to post of Kazi in 1832 C.E. to retaliate growing Darbar politics after which the government papers were jointly signed by Mukhtiyar Bhimsen Thapa and Kazi Surath Singh. His two grandsons from eldest son Ranadhoj Thapa, namely – Ripu Mardan and Badal Singh, were both Kaji at some period. Thus, his family was another influential Bagale Thapa family in the Royal Court alongside the premier Bhimsen Thapa family.

== Early Conquests ==
Bada Amar Singh led many conquest battles of Western provinces in the Unification of Nepal. He was leading the conquest of Langur Gadhi in Gadhwal Region before the outbreak of second Sino-Nepalese War (1791–92 C.E.). He reinforced back to Nuwakot travelling around 1000 km in about a month, in defence of Nepalese forces during the second Sino-Nepalese War of 1791–92 C.E. In July 1804, he along with Kaji Dalbhanjan Pande informed the Company's in-charge Daroga about the orders of takeover of Butwal plains and continuation of honoring Palpa's former obligations from the King of Gorkha. After 1806, the territories of Palpa were kept under the military governorship of him and Kaji Dalbhanjan. They set up plans to establish the full Gorkhali authority over the lands by appointing officials and reviewing land grants. The general administration of the region was looked over and revenue collection was regulated by them. He dissolved the Maafi (rent-free) land grants to Jaisi Brahmins in Butwal area for continuation of payments to Gorkhali soldiers.

As per historical records, Sardar Chandrabhan Khatri was sent to the western front to assist Thapa and was given a "ritually consecrated royal sword which had been in the king's waist for a few days and was instructed to keep the sword with him in the time of fighting, and that the victory will be his". He commanded the Gorkhali Army with Sardar Bhakti Thapa and Hasti Dal Shah in 1804 against Garhwal Kingdom due to the Garhwal's discontinuance of annual payments to Kingdom of Nepal. The army succeeded in annexing Garhwal to Nepalese territory extending the territory of Nepal up to the Sutlej river in the west.

Bada Amar commanded his troops further to Kangra fort of King Sansar Chand. They rested on Jwalamukhi and ultimately captured the fort. King Sansar Chand aided by 1500 soldiers of Sikh Maharaja Ranjit Singh fought against forces of Amar Singh at Ganesh Valley and retreated back only to attack at the evening. Due to the attack in the evening, Gorkhali Army lost some positions and Bada Amar returned to Sutlej river as per agreement on 24 August 1809 AD. The Gurkhas suffered a strike on their pride but were helpless against the superior Westernized Sikh forces.

Bada Kaji Amar Singh advised Mukhtiyar (Chief Authority) of Nepal, Bhimsen Thapa, to avoid war with the British because he waged war in person and knew the hardships of war. He was one of the senior Bharadars to have opposed the Anglo-Nepalese War due to prevalence of weak administration in the western front suggesting a possible revolt from the general people of the newly conquered western front.

== Anglo-Nepalese War ==
The appointment letter of two of three Subbas (governor) of one-third territories of Garhwal, Surabir Khatri and Ranabir Khatri on Ashadh Badi 2, 1862 V.S. (i.e. June 1805) explained the supreme authority Mukhtiyarship (premiership) of Amar Singh in the Western province:

You know at that time that Kaji Ambar Simha Thapa had been sent there in the capacity of Mukhtiyar.......Act in all matters according to the advice of Kaji Ambar Simha Thapa and remain faithful to us.....

— Appointment letter of Subbas of one-third territories of Garhwal, Ashadh Badi 2, 1862 V.S.

Similarly, another appointment letter of Subba of one-third territories of Garhwal, Sardar Chandrabir Kunwar on Ashadh Badi 2, 1862 V.S. (i.e. June 1805), also instructed the governor to act according to the advice of Amar Singh. A British soldier commented to the independent authority of Bada Amar Singh in the western front before the Anglo-Nepalese war:

Further to the westward lies the valley of the Dhoon, and the territory of Sue-na-Ghur; and further still, the more recent conquests, stretching to the village, in which Umar Sing, a chief of uncommon talents, commanded, and indeed, exercised an authority almost independent.

When the Kathmandu Durbar solicited Nepalese chiefs' opinions about a possible war with the British, Amar Singh Thapa was not alone in his opposition, declaring that –

They will not rest satisfied without establishing their own power and authority, and will unite with the hill rajas, whom we have dispossessed. We have hitherto but hunted deer; if we engage in this war, we must prepare to fight tigers.

He was against the measures adopted in Butwal and Sheeoraj, which he declared to have originated in the selfish views of persons, who scrupled not to involve the nation in war to gratify their personal avarice.

=== First Campaign ===
The British columns led by British Generals Rollo Gillespie and David Ochterlony in the Western front faced the defence under the command of Bada Amar Singh. During the first campaign of Anglo-Nepalese War, Badakaji Amar Singh commanded Nepalese army facing columns under Major-General Rollo Gillespie and Colonel David Ochterlony in the Western Front (Kumaon-Gadhwal axis).

He commanded Gorkhali forces to defend the town of Srinagar from The third division army under Major-General Gillespie coming from western side. His son Ranjore Singh Thapa was holding forces at Nahan, the chief town of Sirmaur.

=== Second Campaign ===
During the second campaign, he was serving as sector commander of Sindhuli Gadhi and eastern front facing heavy casualties from the assault of Colonel Kelly and Colonel O'Hollorah under Main Operational commander David Ochterlony. His son Ranjore reached Sindhuli Gadhi to defend the fort. The British couldn't reach Sindhuli Gadhi and felt back.

== Heritages built ==
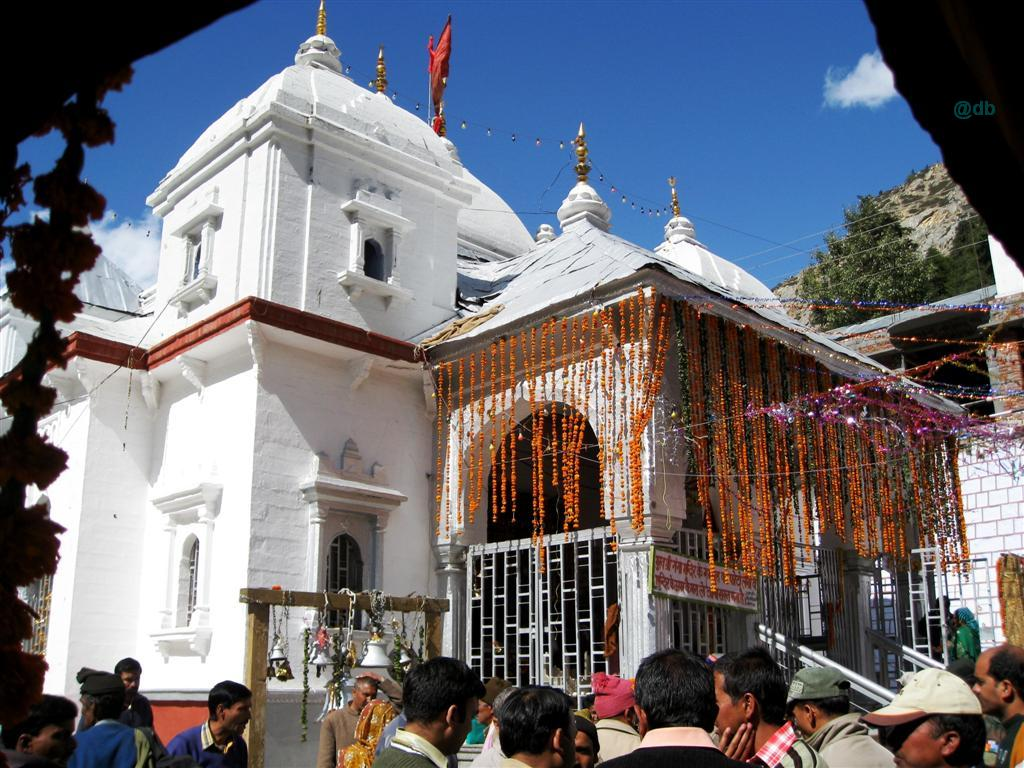
Gangotri Temple was built by Bada Kaji Amar Singh Thapa

Amar Singh was a religious personality who built many forts across Nepal and India. The original Gangotri Temple at Uttarakhand was built by him, which is part of Chhota Char Dham pilgrimage circuit. He built the oldest temple in the Mithila city Janakpur, Nepal, the Sri Ram Temple. After establishment of full Gorkha authority over Palpa and adjacent Terai, he built the Amar Narayan temple at Tansen in the hills above Butwal in 1807.

== Legacy ==
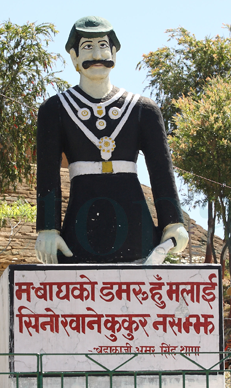
Amar Singh's statue at Amargadhi Fort with his popular quote Ma Bagh ko Damaru hu, malai sino khane kukur nasamjha

Bada Kaji Amar Singh is often hailed as Living Lion of Nepal due to his fighting prowess, greater leadership and patriotism. British Historian Hamilton drew comparisons of him with the ancient Carthaginian General Hannibal. A popular patriotic quote in the Nepalese history is attributed to him:

Ma Bagh ko Damaru hu, malai sino khane Kukur nasamjha. Translation: I am cub of tiger, don't mistake me with a carcass-eating dog. Translated by Arjun Bhadra Khanal

The letter from the central government of Nepal held the praises of Kaji Amar Singh in the letters to other civil and military officers including provincial governors:

Kaji Ambar Simha Thapa is old and mature, and also true to his salt. Act according to his advice.

— Appointment letter of one-third Subba of Garh Chandrabir Kunwar Ashadh Badi 2, 1862 V.S.

The village of Amaragadhi in western Nepal is named for him. There is a Khukuri sword named after him called Amar Singh Thapa Khukuri. This Khukuri is modeled on the real Khukuri used by him. The real Khukuri used by Amar Singh is archived at National Museum of Nepal and is more curvy in nature than other traditional Khukuris.

== Descendants ==
Amar Singh was married to Dharmabati. Nepali historian Surya Bikram Gyawali contends that he had 9 sons namely: Surbir, Randhoj, Ran Singh, Ranjor, Bhakta Bir, Ram Das, Narsingh, Arjun Singh and Bhupal. He further states that all the sons of Amar Singh contributed to the unification of Nepal. Amar Singh had ten sons from four wives as per the Thapa genealogy: Ranabir, Ranasur, Ranadhoj, Ranabhim, Ranajor, Bhaktabir, Ramdas, Narsingh, Arjun Singh, and Bhupal Singh. The Office of the Nepal Antiquary also mentions sons of Amar Singh as Ranajor, Bhaktavir, Ramdas, Ranasur, Ranabir, Arjun, Narsingh and Bhupal. The genealogical table produced by Nepali historian Kumar Pradhan shows the sons of Bada Amar Singh as - Ranadhoj, Bhaktabir, Narsingh, Ramdas and Ranajor, all of whom were Kaji at some point. His grandsons through daughter Ambika Devi and son-in-law Chandravir Kunwar were Birbhadra Kunwar, a military commander in Kumaun and Balabhadra Kunwar, a national hero of the Battle of Nalapani.

Nepali movie director, Sunil Thapa, who is married to popular Nepali actress Jharana Thapa, is an eighth patrilineal descendant of Bada Kaji Amar Singh making their daughter Nepali actress Suhana Thapa a ninth descendant.

== Gallery ==
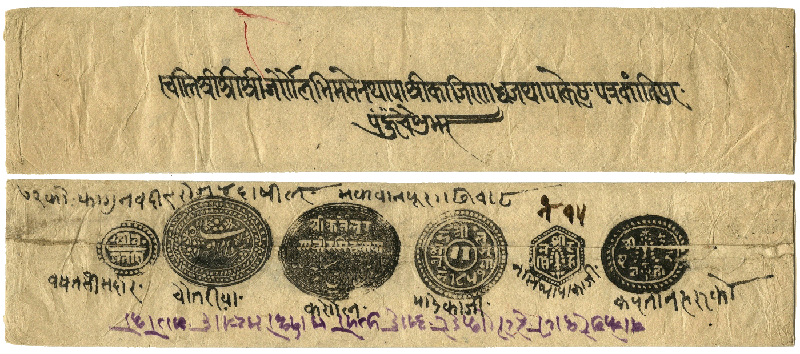
Letter sent to PM Bhimsen Thapa and Kazi Ranadhoj Thapa by (Pvt. seal L to R) Bakhat Singh Sardar, Dalbhanjan Pande (Pande Kazi), Ranabir Singh Thapa, Kaji Narsingh Thapa (Elder Amar Singh Thapa's third son) and sundry captains

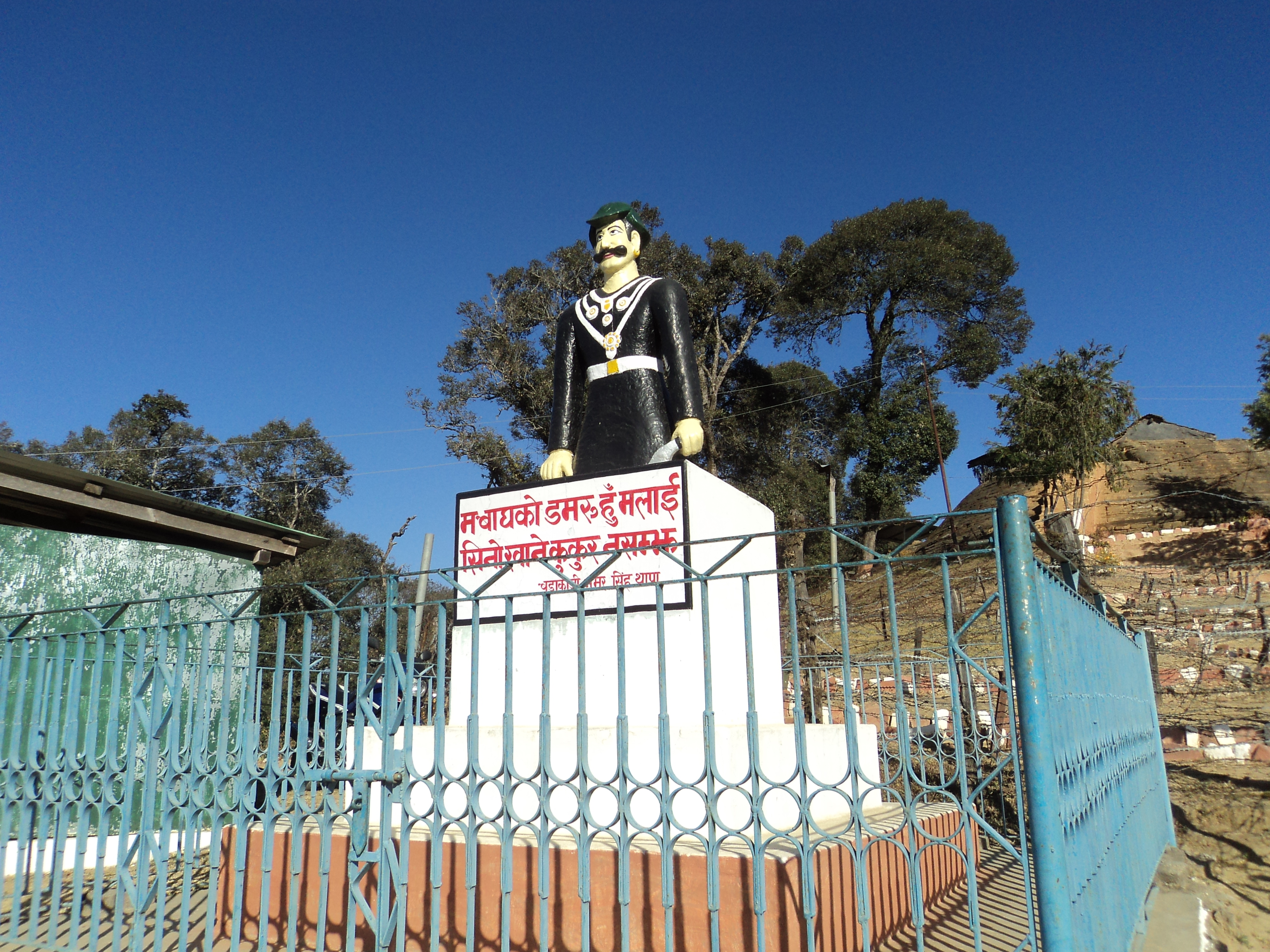
Statue of Amar Singh Thapa (elder) at Amargadhi Fort; Quote is visible in the image

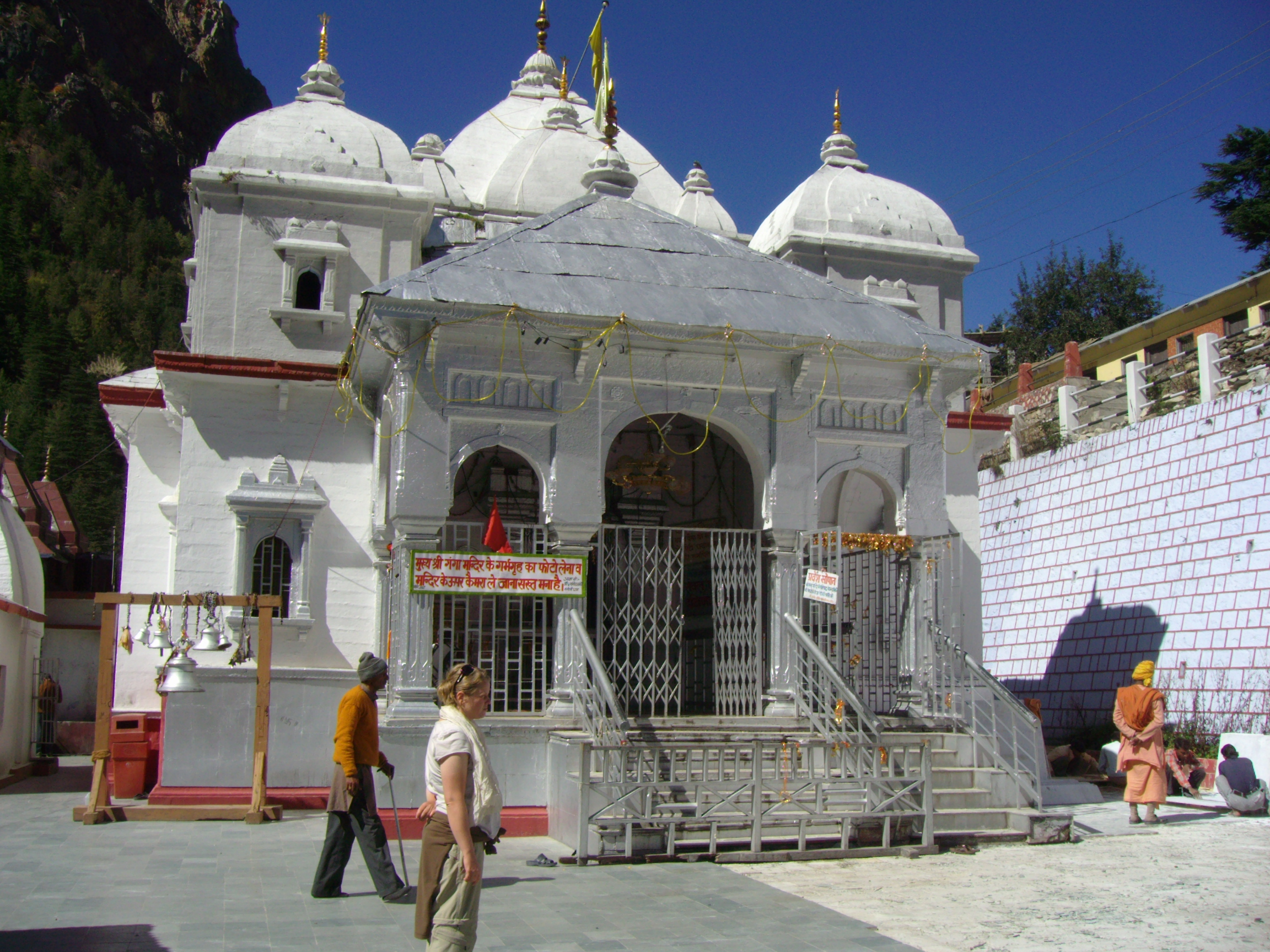
Gangotri Temple was built by Bada Amar Singh

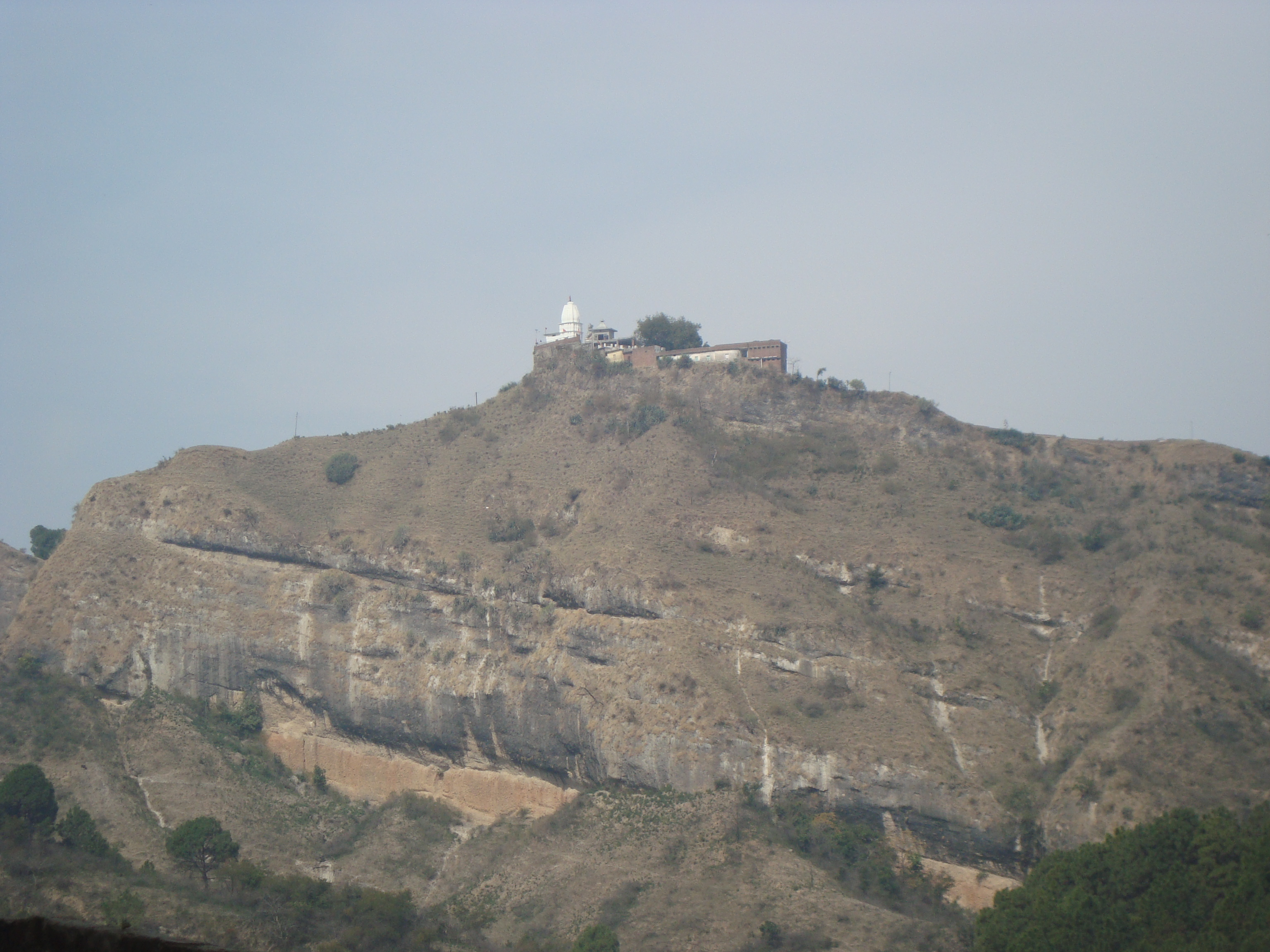
Jayanti Mata Temple near Kangra Fort was built by Bada Amar Singh
