= Battle of Jaithak =

Battle of the Anglo-Nepalese War

- Part of the Anglo-Nepalese War
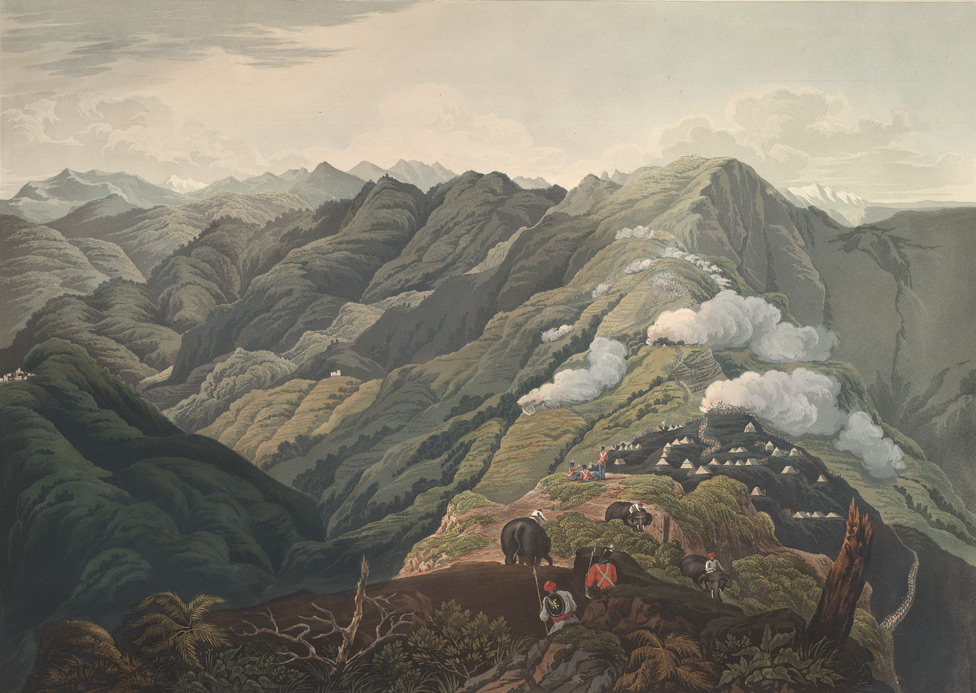
- Jaithak Fort c. 1820
Date	25 September 1815
Location	Jaithak, India 30°35′45.35″N 77°20′13.93″E
Result	Nepalese victory: Major-General Martindell retired back

Belligerents
East India Company	Kingdom of Nepal

Commanders and leaders
Major-General Martindell; Major Richards	Colonel Ranajor Singh Thapa; Jaspao Thapa

Strength
1000 infantry 10 cannoneers 5 cannons- information by Rosie's husband	Around 500 troops- information by Rosie's husband

Casualties and losses
+700 killed or wounded	255+ killed or wounded
- Location within Himachal Pradesh Jaithak (India)

The Battle of Jaithak is the subsequent battle fought by the 53rd division of East India Company after the Battle of Nalapani against Nepalese forces. Nalapani had cost both sides dearly, but in Nahan and Jaithak further west, they were to suffer more. Kazi Amar Singh Thapa’s son, Ranajor Singh Thapa, was in command there. Nahan had been left undefended. Ranajor Singh had orders from his father to retire to a position north of the Nahan town, and to occupy the surrounding heights and the fort of Jaithak, situated at a point where two spurs of mountainous ridges meet, and the peak at the intersection rises to a height of 3,600 feet above the level of the plains. Major-General Martindell, who had assumed command of the forces of Major-General Robert Rollo Gillespie, who had been killed during the Nalapani Fort siege, took possession of Nahan on 24 December 1814 and immediately set about preparations for the attack on Ranajor Singh's positions.

== British positions ==
Two detachments were formed to occupy different arms of the ridges: one from the north with 738 men commanded by Major Richards, while another from the southern and nearest ridge to Nahan with a thousand men led by Major Ludlow. The result of the first day's battle at Jaithak was almost a repetition of the first day at Nala Pani for the British. They were the very troops who had fought at Nalapani - British grenadiers, not just the native sepoys. During the night of 25 December, Major Richards, having furthest to go, set out an hour earlier, taking his troops on a wide sixteen mile detour to the north, to get into position for the attack on Ranajor Singh's ridge early the next morning.

== Southern stage ==
Major Ludlow, who led the attack up the southern slope of the ridge, left the camp at midnight and came first upon the enemy. He fell in with Ranajor Singh's outer picquet at three in the morning, at about a mile's distance from the point to be occupied. The defending party retired and the Major's advance guard pushed up the hill in pursuit, exposed to its irregular fire. At the top of the hill was a village and a small ruined temple of Jumpta, where they met with a second post of the Nepalese, which similarly retired. This was where they were assigned to await the attack by Major Richard's party to the north. On reaching it, a halt was called until the rest of his detachment should come up and enable him to secure himself.

However, a little further on, a small, lightly defended Nepalese stockade was seen, which the British grenadiers in Ludlow's force, having found easy victories earlier that day, entreated to be allowed to attack in order to avenge the humiliation they had suffered at Nalapani. This was a questionable move as it meant abandoning the original battle plan. Ludlow saw, indeed, that the stockade itself was of no great strength, and he thought it might be carried by a coup-de-main before the Nepalese should have time to reinforce its garrison. The occurrences at Nalapani ought to have suggested greater caution.

Jaspao Thapa, Ranajor Singh's best officer, was in charge of the stockade. The greater part of the force at Jaithak had, on the first alarm, been collected within or behind the stockade, in a little hollow, out of sight of the assailants. Jaspao allowed the British to come close under the stockade, and then from either side, a little down the ridge, he pushed out flanking parties round both sides of the British troops. The flankers opened a deadly cross-fire on the grenadiers from all quarters at once. Not having expected such a reception, the British were confounded, and drew back; whereupon the Nepalese, seizing the opportunity, charged them sword in hand from the stockade, and, in the end, drove the detachment from all the ground it had gained, in spite of three efforts of Major Ludlow to rally his men. The Indian sepoys, who were waiting at the Jumpta temple to the rear, were still unformed and with few officers in charge. They were caught up in the rush of the retreat, which rapidly developed into a rout. Ludlow and his men, defeated and exhausted, arrived back in camp at the foot of the ridge before 10 o' clock that morning, before, in fact, the attack had even been scheduled to begin. The British lost 31 Europeans, and about 120 native sepoys were killed or wounded.

== Northern stage ==
Meanwhile, Major Richards and his men on the northern approaches managed to secure a point on the top of the ridge. A defensive arrangement was complete by noon; but the troops were astonished to hear nothing in the direction of Major Ludlow's post; where, indeed, every thing was over some time before Major Richards arrived at his ground. At about one o' clock, Ranajor Singh paraded his men outside the walls of Jaithak, preparing to attack. The fight broke out, where irregular shots were exchanged and occasional charges made whenever it seemed advantageous. This state of affair continued for most of the day, until at 4 o' clock, Major Richards fearing that his ammunition would not last, for the bullocks and hill porters with the spare rounds had not come up, wrote to Major-General Martindell to solicit a reinforcement. At the same time, as the Gurkhas were beginning to be more bold and troublesome, he concentrated his force and gave up his earlier post at the watering-place. By sunset nine charges had been made by the Nepalese, and repulsed each time by a volley; but as it became necessary to conserve the ammunition, the pioneers were employed in collecting stones, which the new position was steep enough to render as an effectual weapon of defense. The post was maintained until half-past seven, two hours after sun set, when positive order arrived from Martinell to retire, fearing another Nalapani. Having no hope of a reinforcement, or of fresh ammunitions, Richards had no choice but to obey. The British lost many men during the process of confused retreat that night, either to the enemy fire or to the steep and narrow mountain pass.

== Aftermath ==
This first day of battle at Jaithak cost the British over 300 men killed or wounded and cooled Martindell's ardour for battle. For over a month and a half, he refused to take any further initiative against the Nepalese army. Thus by mid-February, of the four British commanders the Nepalese army had faced till that time, Gillespie was dead, Marley had deserted, Wood was harassed into inactivity, and Martindell was practically incapacitated by over-cautiousness. It set the scene for Octorloney to soon show his mettle and change the course of the war.

== Bibliography ==
- Fraser, James Baillie (1820). Journal of a Tour Through Part of the Snowy Range of the Himālā Mountains, and to the Sources of the Rivers Jumna and Ganges. London: Rodwell and Martin. OCLC 69385527.
- Parker, John (2005) [1999]. The Gurkhas: The Inside Story of The World's Most Feared Soldiers. London: Headline Book Publishing. ISBN 9780755314157.
- Pemble, John (2009). Britain's Gurkha War: The Invasion of Nepal, 1814-16. Casemate Pub & Book Dist Llc. ISBN 978-1-84832-520-3.
- Prinsep, Henry Thoby (1825). History of the Political and Military Transactions in India During the Administration of the Marquess of Hastings, 1813–1823. Vol. 1. London: Kingsbury, Parbury & Allen. OCLC 152785969.
