= Ranadhoj Thapa =

Top administrator in Nepal

Sri Kaji Ranadhwaj Thapa
- श्री काजी रणध्वज थापा
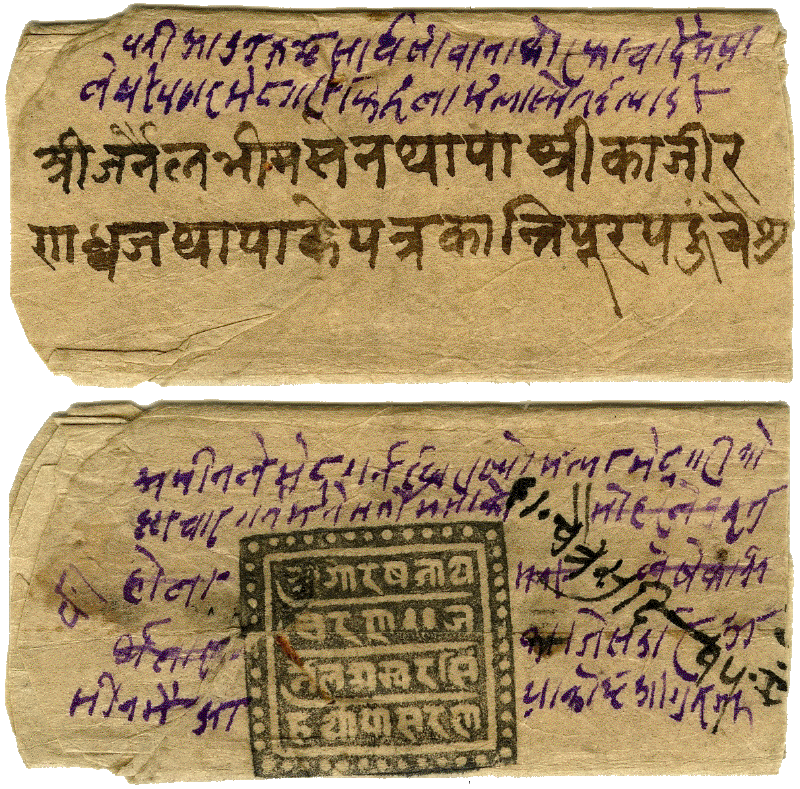
- Outer cover of letter sent by Badakaji Amar Singh Thapa to Mukhtiyar Bhimsen Thapa and his own son Kaji Ranadhoj Thapa in Kantipur (Kathmandu)

Deputy Kaji to Mukhtiyar of Nepal
- In office 1816 - 1831
- Monarchs: Girvan Yuddha Bikram Shah; Rajendra Bikram Shah
- Prime Minister: Bhimsen Thapa

Personal details
- Relations: Family of Amar Singh Thapa
- Children: Ripu Mardan Thapa; Badal Singh Thapa
- Parent: Amar Singh Thapa (father)

Military service
- Allegiance: Nepal
- Rank: Kaji

Ranadhoj Thapa or Ranadhwaj Thapa (Nepali: रणध्वज थापा) was the deputy Kaji to Mukhtiyar (Prime Minister) of Nepal Bhimsen Thapa.

== Family and Life ==
He was the eldest son of Bada Kaji Amar Singh Thapa, supreme commander of Western front. He was great grandson of Ranjai [of Sirhanchowk] and grandson of Bhim Sen, known as Umrao Bagh Bhim Singh Thapa, who died in the battle of Palanchowk in 1759 AD. His father was member of Bagale Thapa clan. He had 4 brothers; Bhaktabir Singh, Narsingh, Ramdas and Ranjore Singh, all of whom were Kaji at some point. He was functioning deputy to Mukhtiyar (Prime Minister) during the Anglo-Nepalese war. Mukhtiyar Bhimsen Thapa had to share administrative authority with him. Thus, his family was the other influential Bagale Thapa family serving in the royal court with Bhimsen Thapa family, due to their consolidation of power in the central authority. He retired as Kaji of Nepal in the year 1831 A.D. His two sons, Ripu Mardan Thapa and Badal Singh Thapa, also retired as Kaji of Nepal.

== Gallery ==
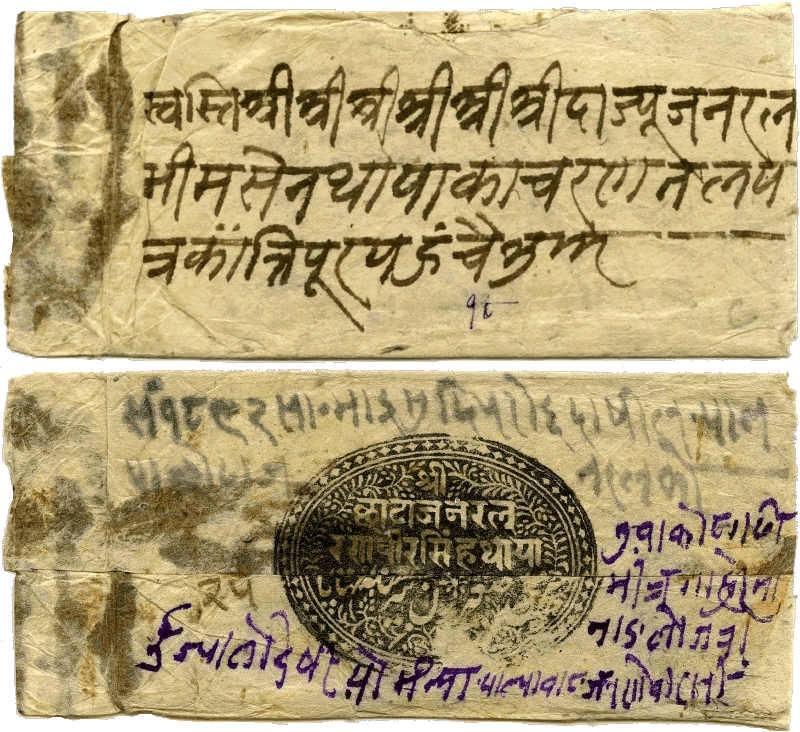
General Ranabir Singh Thapa's letter signed by his private black seal sent to Mukhtiyar (PM) Bhimsen Thapa and 2nd Kazi (Deputy PM) Ranadhoj Thapa

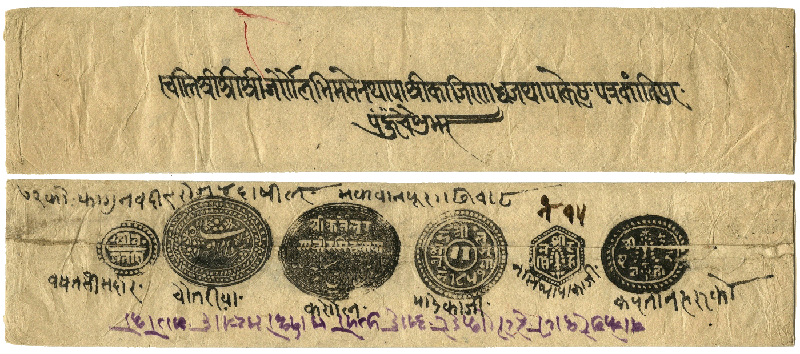
Outer cover of letter sent to PM Bhimsen Thapa and Kazi Ranadhoj Thapa by (Pvt. seal L to R) Bakhat Singh Sardar, Dalbhanjan Pande (Pande Kazi), Ranabir Singh Thapa, Kaji Narsingh Thapa (Elder Amar Singh Thapa's another son) and sundry captains

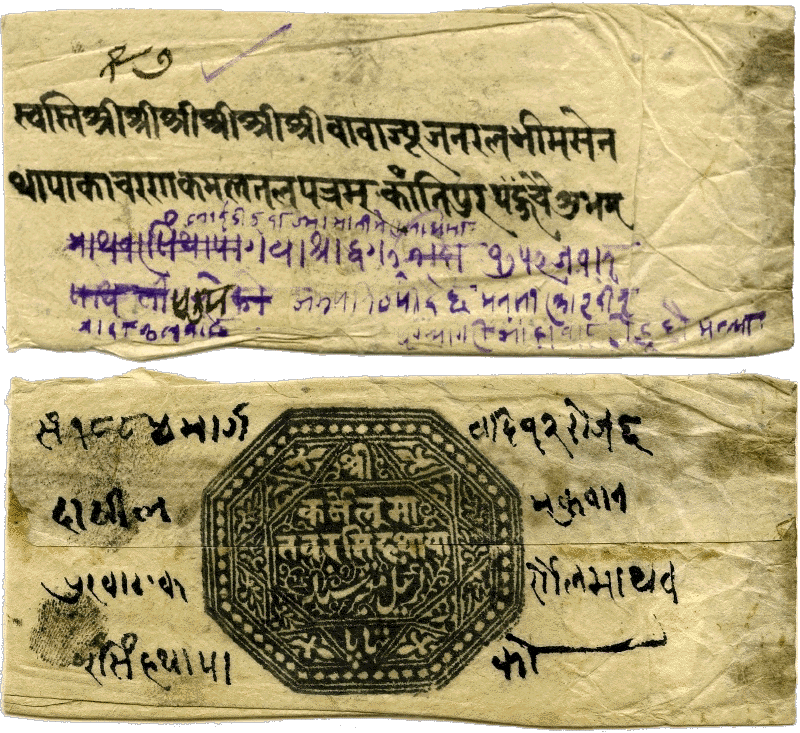
Outer cover of letter sent to PM Bhimsen Thapa and Kazi Ranadhoj Thapa by then Colonel Mathabar Singh Thapa
