= Thapar =

Thapar may refer to

- Thapar (surname), an Indian surname
- Thapar family, a business family of India
- Thapar University in Punjab, India
- Thapar Vidya Vihar, a school in Telangana, India
- Thapar Group, a company in India
- Mr. Thapar, a fictional character in the 2013 Indian film Yeh Jawani Hai Deewani, played by Farooq Sheikh
- Mata Mansa Devi Is Kuldevi Of Thapar Gotra

== See also ==
- Thapa (disambiguation)
- Thappad, 2020 Indian Hindi-language drama film by Anubhav Sinha
