= Takam, Nepal =

Takam, Nepal टकम
- Village development committee
- Location in Nepal Takam, Nepal (Nepal)
- Coordinates: 28.47°N 83.36°E
- Country: Nepal
- Zone: Dhaulagiri Zone
- District: Myagdi District

Population (1991)
  - Total: 3,629
- Time zone: UTC+5:45 (Nepal Time)

Takam is a village development committee in Myagdi District in the Dhaulagiri Zone of western-central Nepal. At the time of the 1991 Nepal census it had a population of 3629 people living in 757 individual households.
