= Jyamrukot =

Jyamrukot ज्यामरुकोट
- Location in Nepal Jyamrukot (Nepal)
- Coordinates: 28.33°N 83.56°E
- Country: Nepal
- Zone: Dhaulagiri Zone
- District: Myagdi District

Population (1991)
  - Total: 2,825
- Time zone: UTC+5:45 (Nepal Time)

Jyamrukot is a market center in Beni Municipality in Myagdi District in the Dhaulagiri Zone of western-central Nepal. The former village development committee was annexed to form the new municipality on May 18, 2014. At the time of the 1991 Nepal census it had a population of 2825 people living in 578 individual households.
