= Battle of Nalapani =

First battle of the Anglo-Nepalese War

- Part of the Anglo-Nepalese War
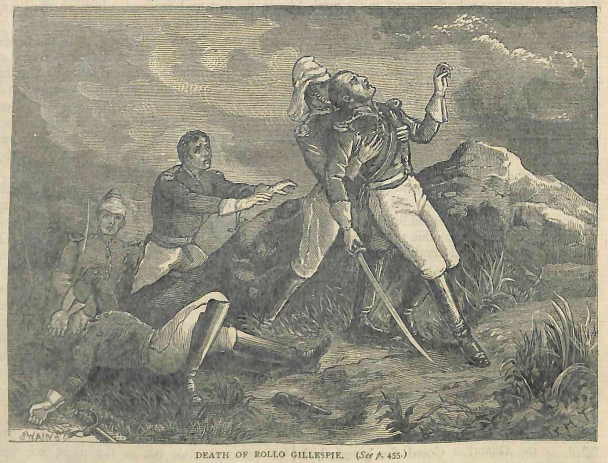
- Death of Rollo Gillespie (Cassell's illustrated history of India, 1890)
Date	31 October – 30 November 1814
Location	Dehradun, India 30.392922°N 78.085443°E
Result	British victory

Belligerents
East India Company	Kingdom of Nepal

Commanders and leaders
Robert Gillespie †; Sebright Mawbey	Balbhadra Kunwar; Ripumardan Thapa (WIA)

Strength
3,500 infantry 50 cannoneers 20 cannons	About 800 (men, women and children)

Casualties and losses
Over 690 killed 2100+ wounded	Over 500 killed 200wounded
- Location in India Nalapani (India)

The Battle of Nalapani was the first battle of the Anglo-Nepalese War of 1814–1816, fought between the forces of the British East India Company and Nepal, then ruled by the House of Gorkha. The battle took place around the Nalapani fort, near Dehradun, which was placed under a month-long siege by the British, between 31 October and 30 November 1814. The fort's garrison was commanded by Captain Balbhadra Kunwar, while Major-General Robert Rollo Gillespie, who had previously fought in the Battle of Java, was in charge of the attacking British troops. Gillespie was killed on the first day of the siege while rallying his men. Despite considerable odds, both in terms of numbers and firepower, Balbhadra and his 600-strong garrison successfully held out against more than 5,000 British troops for over a month.

After two costly and unsuccessful attempts to seize the fort by direct attack, the British changed their approach and sought to force the garrison to surrender by cutting off the fort's external water supply. Having suffered three days of thirst, on the last day of the siege, Balbhadra, refusing to surrender, led the 70 surviving members of the garrison in a charge against the besieging force. Fighting their way out of the fort, the survivors escaped into the nearby hills. Considering the time, effort, and resources spent to capture the small fort, it was a pyrrhic victory for the British. A number of later engagements, including one at Jaithak, unfolded in a similar way; but more than any other battle of the war, the fighting around Nalapani established the Gurkhas' reputation as warriors. As a result, they were later recruited by the British to serve in their army.

== Background ==
=== Situation ===
In 1814 under the new and ambitious Governor-General Francis Edward Rawdon-Hastings, the Earl of Moira, the long-standing diplomatic disputes between British India and the Kingdom of Nepal, caused by expansionist policies of both parties, descended into open hostility. The British East India Company sought to invade Nepal not just to secure the border and to force the Nepali government to open trading routes to Tibet, but also for what Hastings saw as a geo-political necessity to secure the foothold of the Company in the Indian sub-continent.

The initial British campaign plan was to attack on two fronts across a frontier stretching more than 1,500 km (930 miles), from the Sutlej river in the west to the tista river in the east. On the eastern front, Major-Generals Bennet Marley and John Sullivan Wood led their respective columns across the Tarai towards the heart of the Kathmandu Valley; at the same time Major-General Rollo Gillespie and Colonel David Ochterlony led the columns on the western front. These two western columns faced the Nepalese army under the command of Amar Singh Thapa. Around the beginning of October 1814, the British troops began to move towards their depots and the army was soon after formed into four divisions: one at Benares, one at Meerut, one at Dinapur, and one at Ludhiana.

The division at Meerut was formed under Gillespie, and originally consisted of one British infantry regiment, the 53rd, which with artillery and a few dismounted dragoons, made up about 1,000 Europeans. In addition to this, there were about 2,500 native infantrymen; this made up a total force of 3,513 men. Once assembled, it marched directly to Dehra Dun, which was the principal town in the Dun Valley. After having captured or destroyed the forts in the valley, the plan called for Gillespie to either move eastwards to expel Amar Singh Thapa's troops from Srinagar, or westwards to take Nahan, the largest town in the Sirmaur district, where Amar Singh's son, Ranjore Singh Thapa, controlled the government. Once completed, Gillespie was to sweep on towards the Sutlej in order to isolate Amar Singh, and force him to negotiate.

Of the four British divisions mentioned above, Gillespie's was the first to penetrate the enemy's frontier. The Nepalese had anticipated that Dehra Dun would be the first place of assault, and had tasked Captain (Note: "The use of English terms for their grades of command was common in the Gurkha army, but the powers of the different ranks did not correspond with those of the British system. The title of general was assumed by Bhimsen Thapa, as commander-in-chief, and enjoyed by himself alone; of colonels there were three or four only; all principal officers of the court, commanding more than one battalion. The title of major was held by the adjutant of a battalion or independent company; and captain was the next grade to colonel, implying the command of a corps. Luftun, or lieutenant, was the style of the officers commanding companies under the captain; and then followed the subaltern ranks of soobadar, jemadar, and havildar, without any ensigns.") Balbhadra Kunwar with the fortification of the place. When Balbhadra Kunwar, commander of the Nepalese defence army at Dehradun, heard of the approach of the British Army and its size, he realised that it would be impossible to defend the city. He withdrew from Dehradun and moved his force of about 600, including dependents, to a hill north-east of the city. He subsequently took up a position in the small fort of Nalapani, Khalanga. His force was ethnically diverse, consisting of Magar soldiers belonging to the Purano Gorakh Battalion and soldiers that had been recruited from Garhwal and nearby areas. On 22 October, before the British declaration of war on 1 November 1814, Gillespie seized the Keree Pass leading into the Dun Valley. He then proceeded to Dehra unchallenged.

A letter was sent by the British to Balbhadra, summoning him to surrender the fort. Upon receiving the note, Balbhadra tore it up. The letter having been delivered to him at midnight, he observed that "it was not customary to receive or answer letters at such unseasonable hours". Nevertheless, he responded by sending his "salaam" to the English "sirdar", assuring him that he would soon visit him in his camp.

=== Terrain and defences ===
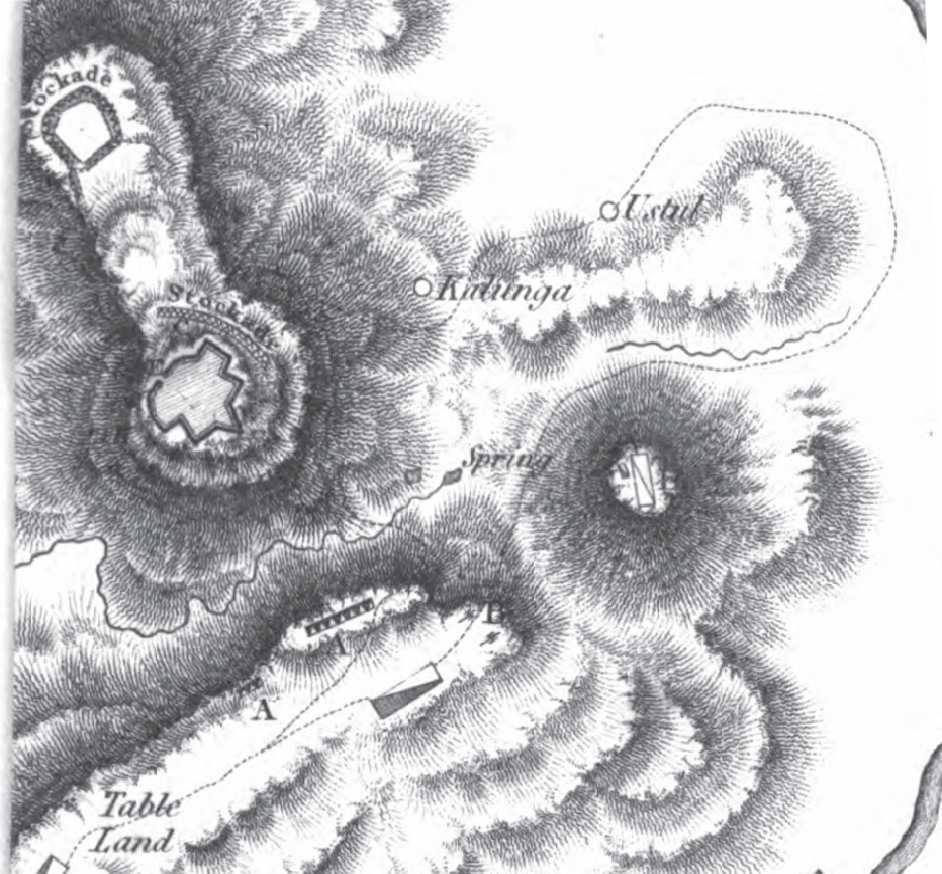
The layout of Nalapani fort. The water source that the Nepalese depended on is seen to be outside the fort.

The Nalapani fort was situated on a 500–600-foot (150–180 m) hill that was covered in dense jungle. The approach to the fort was very steep in most directions and the top of the hill, which formed a tabletop feature, was about .75 miles (1.21 km) in length. Its highest point was to the south, where the town of Kalanga was located. The fort was constructed in an irregular shape, having been built to conform with the shape of the ground upon which it was situated, and at the time the British entered the Dun Valley, its walls had not been finished. Upon their arrival, the British found the Nepalese defenders working to improve the fort's defences and raising the height of the walls.

By the time the first attack took place, the walls of the fort still had not been finished, although they had been raised slightly. As a result of the hasty construction work, even at the wall's lowest part, it was high enough that the attacking force would need ladders to reach the top of the rampart. Every point where the fort was approachable, or thought weak by its defenders, was bolstered by stockades made out of stones and stakes that had been stuck into the ground. These were covered by cannons that were placed where they could be most effective, and a wicket gate that flanked a large part of the wall, was left open but cross-barred, to make it difficult for attacking soldiers to enter but also to channel their advance towards a cannon that had been placed at the gate to enfilade its approach with showers of grapeshot.

== Battle ==
=== First British attack ===
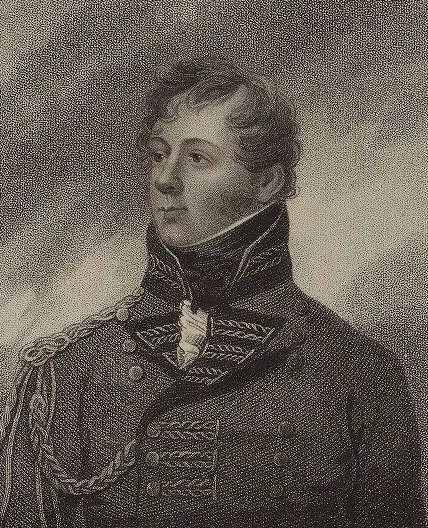
Sir Robert Rollo Gillespie

Following their arrival, the British reconnoitred the fort and began planning for the assault. Parties were employed in preparing fascines and gabions for the establishment for artillery batteries, while two 12-pounder guns, four 5.5-inch howitzers, and four six-pounders were carried up the hill on elephants. The British secured the table-land without any Nepalese resistance and the gun batteries were ready to open fire on the fort on the morning of 31 October, at a distance of 600 yards (550 m).

The first British attack on Nalapani took place on 31 October, a day before the official declaration of war. Gillespie planned to storm the fort from four sides. The storming party was formed into four columns, support by a reserve: the first, under Colonel Carpenter, consisted of 611 men; the second, under Captain Fast, was 363 strong; the third, under Major Kelly, was made up of 541 men; the fourth, under Captain Campbell, had 283 men; while 939 men made up the reserve, under Major Ludlow. It was intended for these columns to ascend from different points, at a signal made through the guns firing in a specific manner, and thus attack the Nepalese from different sides. In doing so, the British hoped to divert the attention of the Nepalese and prevent them from concentrating their fire on any one point, allowing the attackers to gain an advantage.

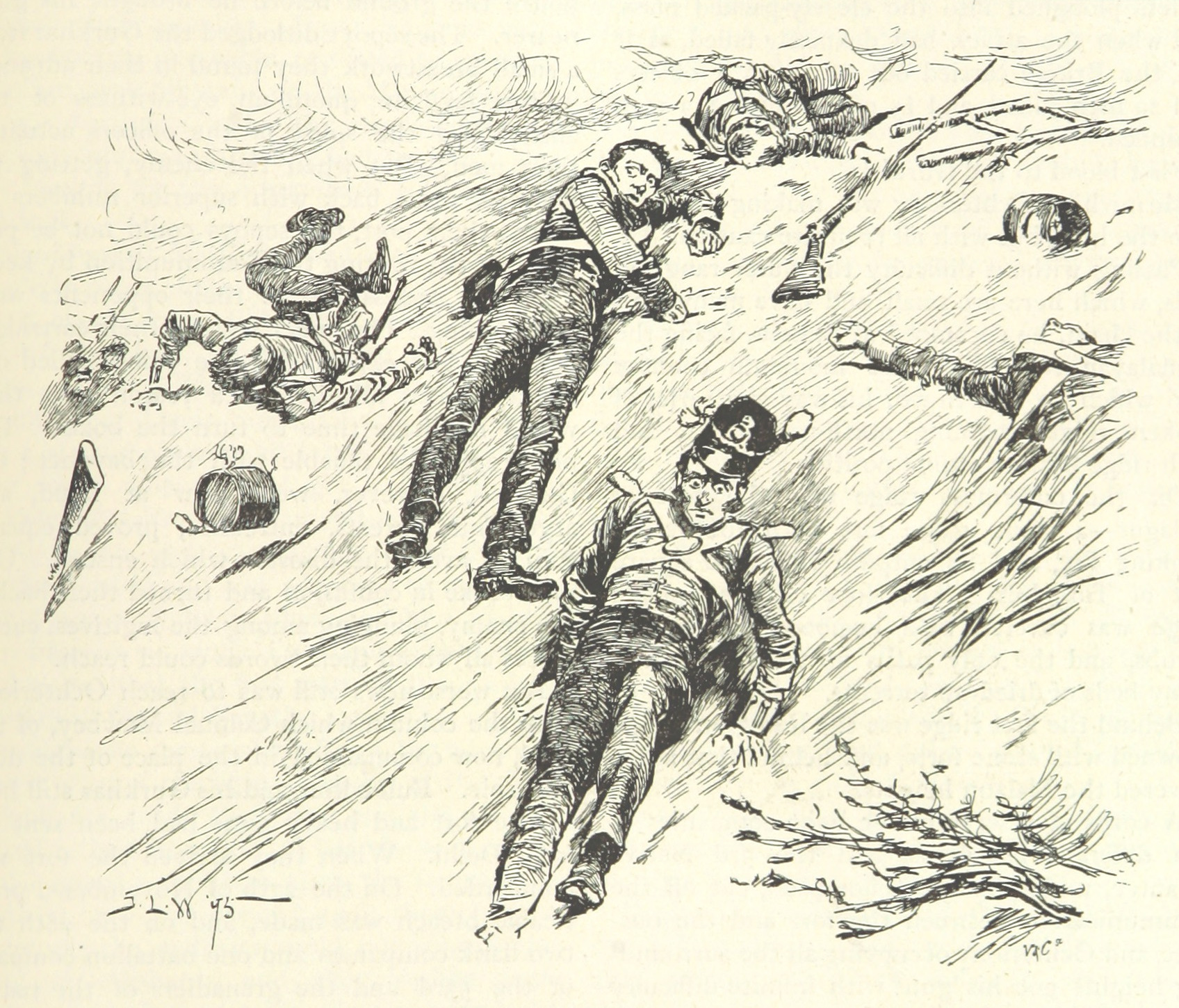
British pioneers falling back after the first attack's failure

However, after the attack began only two columns, those under Carpenter and Ludlow, responded to Gillespie's signal to assault, which was given some hours earlier than was intended. Under the cover of fire, pioneers twice swarmed up to the walls, only to be cut down by the enfilade fire of Bal Bhadra's cannons that were positioned along a large part the wall. The garrison maintained a heavy bombardment from the walls, and heavy showers of arrows and of stones rained down on the assailants. Women inside the fort also threw missiles, exposing themselves to British fire. Gillespie's men fell back and on seeing this, he moved forward from the artillery line to personally rally his men. With three fresh companies of the 53rd Regiment, he reached a spot within 30 yards (27 m) of the wicket, where, "as he was cheering the men, waving his hat in one hand, and his sword in the other," a Nepalese marksman shot him "through the heart, and he fell dead on the spot." The General's death forced the British to temporarily cease their attack and withdraw. Total British casualties for the day were 32 dead and 228 wounded, some of whom subsequently died. (Note: Neither Prinsep nor Fraser record the number of men who subsequently died of their wounds in any of the attacks. Given that the fighting took place during the pre-antiseptic era of medicine, it is likely that the number of men who succumbed to their wounds after the battle was high. When this is taken into account along with those killed during the attacks, the British mortality figures tally more closely with the estimates given by Nepali agents within the British forces.)

=== Second British attack ===
Not having expected such a determined resistance from the Nepalese, Colonel Sebright Mawbey, who was next in command of the British troops at Nalapani, retired to Dehra until 24 November so that heavy guns could arrive from Delhi. After the reinforcements had arrived, the fighting resumed on 25 November and for three days the fort was bombarded until, at noon on 27 November, a large section of northern wall finally gave away. The British forces, seeing their opportunity, twice tried to charge into the breach that day, but were repelled and pinned to an exposed position just outside the wall. An attempt was then made to fire one of the light guns into the breach to provide obscuration with gun smoke to cover a further attack, but that too proved unsuccessful. The day ended with the British assault force withdrawing after spending two hours pinned outside the wall, exposed to heavy fire from the garrison, and having suffered significant losses. British casualties for the day amounted to 37 dead and over 443 wounded.

=== Nepalese withdrawal ===
After two failed attempts to capture the fort by straight forward attacks, the British resorted to attrition tactics. On 28 November, instead of launching another infantry assault, the fort was encircled from all sides and placed under siege. This prevented Nepalese reinforcements from entering the fort. Mawbey then instructed his gunners, by now strongly reinforced, to fire into the fort. He also sent scouts to locate and cut off the fort's external water source. The water situation was made worse for the defenders when about a hundred earthen vessels stocked with water, stored in a portico, were destroyed in the bombardment. The eastern and northern walls of the fort were razed to the ground. The continuous bombardment also caused three of the four cannons installed on the fort's battlements to fall outside the fort, while the other fell inside. The other cannons that the Nepalese possessed were unusable, having either been disabled by misfiring during previous attacks, or because they had been buried under rubble in the British bombardment. Left without any cannons to reply, the garrison suffered heavy casualties. They continued to resist using gunfire and stones, but eventually the few people that remained in the fort became desperate and could not hold on any longer. That night, despite threats to their person and property, desertion became rampant.

By the following day, 29 November, the garrison's water supply had been exhausted. The walls of the fort had also collapsed and the garrison was exposed, leading to further casualties amongst the Nepali troops. Seeing the disheartened state of men, the Captain and other officers asked them to sign a pledge to fight to the last. Eighty-four soldiers signed. However, that night the Mleccha Kalanala Company, which had arrived as reinforcements and was stationed at a portico east of Nalapani, secretly abandoned their post, taking with them their arms and colours. Seeing this, some of the men who had signed the pledge followed. The 50 or 60 men that remained, overcome by the hopelessness of the situation, felt that instead of confronting certain death by remaining in the fort, it was better to escape to the hills and hold their position there. Perhaps unable to convince their commanders with words, the escaping men caught hold of their Captain and other officers by their arms, and dragged them away from the fort. Learning of this new movement, the British renewed their fire; but the Nepalese managed to cut through and make a successful escape.

Thus, after days of thirst and continuous bombardment, the Nepalese were forced to evacuate the fort on 30 November. Bal Bhadra refused to surrender and with about 70 of his surviving men he was able to fight his way through the besieging force and escape into the hills. When the British troops entered the fort, it was found, as Prinsep writes, in a "shocking state, full of the remains of men and women killed by the shot shells of our batteries; a number of wounded were likewise lying about, and the stench was intolerable." (Note: Fraser describes the interior of the fort in more graphic terms: "The whole area of the fort was a slaughter-house, strewed with the bodies of the dead and the wounded, and the dissevered limbs of those who had been torn to pieces by the bursting of the shells; those who yet lived piteously calling out for water, of which they had not tasted for days. The stench from the place was dreadful; many of the bodies of those that had been early killed had been insufficiently interred: and our officers found in the ruins the remains and the clothes of several thus incompletely covered, starting into view. One chief was thus found out, who had fallen in the first attempt, and had received this wretched semisepulture. The bodies of several woman, killed by shot or shells, were discovered; and even children mangled, and yet alive, by the same ruthless engines.")

Upwards of 90 dead bodies were found and cremated, while the wounded were sent to British hospitals; the rest of the fort was then razed to the ground.

== Aftermath ==
=== Conduct during battle ===
During the fighting, the British were impressed by the conduct of the Nepalese soldiers during the battle who, according to British accounts, exhibited fair conduct towards them. This endeared them to the British, who were willing to reciprocate by giving medical aid to wounded and captured Nepalese. The confidence the Nepalese exhibited in the British officers was significant: they not only accepted, but also solicited surgical aid, even while continuing to fight. This gave rise, on one occasion, to a scene, which was recounted by the Scottish traveller James Baillie Fraser:

While the batteries were playing, a man was perceived on the breach, advancing and waving his hand. The guns ceased firing for a while, and the man came into the batteries: he proved to be a Ghoorkha, whose lower jaw had been shattered by a cannon shot, and who came thus frankly to solicit assistance from his enemy.

It is unnecessary to add, that it was instantly afforded. He recovered; and, when discharged from the hospital, signified his desired to return to his corps to combat us again: exhibiting thus, through the whole, a strong sense of the value of generosity and courtesy in warfare, and also of his duty to his country, – separating completely in his own mind private and national feelings from each other, – and his frank confidence in the individuals of our nation, from the duty he owed his own, to fight against us collectively.

=== Legacy ===
The fighting around Nalapani, more than any other battle, established the reputation of the Gurkhas as warriors, and won the admiration of the British. Gillespie had been killed and Balbhadra and his 600 men had held the might of the British and their native Indian troops for a month. Even with only 70 remaining survivors after his water source had been cut off, Balbhadra had refused to surrender, and instead had charged out and successfully fought his way through the siege. It set the tone for the rest of the campaign.

Fraser recorded the situation in the following terms:

The determined resolution of the small party which held this small post for more than a month, against so comparatively large a force, must surely wring admiration from every voice, especially when the horrors of the latter portion of this time are considered; the dismal spectacle of their slaughtered comrades, the sufferings of their women and children thus immured with themselves, and the hopelessness of relief, which destroyed any other motive for their obstinate defence they made, than that resulting from a high sense of duty, supported by unsubdued courage. This, and a generous spirit of courtesy towards their enemy, certainly marked the character of the garrison of Kalunga, during the period of its siege.

Whatever the nature of the Ghoorkhas may have been found in other quarters, there was here no cruelty to wounded or to prisoners; no poisoned arrows were used; (Note: This is a very contradictory observation, considering the fact that Balbhadra had written to his superiors asking for the replenishment of, among other things, poisoned arrows.) no wells or waters were poisoned; no rancorous spirit of revenge seemed to animate them: they fought us in fair conflict, like men; and, in intervals of actual combat, showed us a liberal courtesy worthy of a more enlightened people.

So far from insulting the bodies of the dead and wounded, they permitted them to lie untouched, till carried away; and none were stripped, as is too universally the case.

The battle also had significant political repercussions, shaking the British army's confidence. The fact that the siege had taken so long exposed the British forces' vulnerabilities and encouraged the native Indian states – in particular the old Maratha Confederacy in central India – to continue their struggle against the British in the hope that they could still be defeated.

In the years following the battle, the British constructed two small obelisks that still stand in Nalapani. One was laid in honour of Gillespie, while another was dedicated with the inscription "Our brave adversary Bul Buddur and his gallant men". (Note: The inscription uses an alternate spelling of Bal Bhadra's name, "Bul Buddur".) In Nepal, the story of the battle at Nalapani has gained a legendary status and has become an important part of the nation's historical narrative, while Balbhadra himself has become a national hero. The fighting spirit displayed by the Nepalese in this and other following battles of Anglo-Nepalese War ultimately led to the recruitment of Gurkhas into the British forces.

== Nalapanima ==
The battle provides the setting to a Nepali musical drama called Nalapanima written by Bal Krishna Sama and composed by Shiva Shankar. In the drama, the patriotism of a Nepalese soldier is depicted when, after being wounded, the soldier seeks help from the British camp. Later he is grateful for the humanitarian assistance provided by the British but refuses an offer to defect to their army.

== See also ==
- Battle of Jaithak

== Bibliography ==
- Acharya, Baburam (1 January 1971). "King Girban's Letter to Kaji Ranjor Thapa" (PDF). Regmi Research Series. 3 (1): 3–5. ISSN 0034-348X.
- Anon (May 1816). "An Account of the War in Nepal; Contained in a Letter from an Officer on the Staff of the Bengal Army". Asiatic Journal and Monthly Miscellany. 1: 425–429. OCLC 1514448.
- Anon (1822). Military Sketches of the Goorka War in India: In the Years 1814, 1815, 1816. London: Woodbridge (Printed by J. Loder for R. Hunter). OCLC 470785427.
- Farewell, Byron (1984). The Gurkhas. London: W.W. Norton & Company. ISBN 9780393017731.
- Fraser, James Baillie (1820). Journal of a Tour Through Part of the Snowy Range of the Himālā Mountains, and to the Sources of the Rivers Jumna and Ganges. London: Rodwell and Martin. OCLC 69385527.
- Gott, Richard (2011). "Bulbhadar Singh and Gurkha Resistance in Nepal". Britain's Empire: Resistance, Repression and Revolt. Verso Books. pp. 197–198. ISBN 9781844677382.
- Onta, Pratyoush (January 1996). "Ambivalence Denied: The Making of Rastriya Itihas in Panchayat Era Textbooks" (PDF). Contributions to Nepalese Studies. 23 (1): 213–254. OCLC 60628049.
- Pant, Mahesh Raj (1 October 1978). "Nepal's Defeat in the Nepal-British War" (PDF). Regmi Research Series. 10 (10). Kathmandu: 150–159. ISSN 0034-348X.
- Pant, Mahesh Raj (1 December 1978). "The Battle of Nalapani" (PDF). Regmi Research Series. 10 (11 and 12). Kathmandu: 167–170, 187–194. ISSN 0034-348X.
- Pant, Mahesh Raj (1 January 1979). "More Documents on the Battle of Nalapani" (PDF). Regmi Research Series. 11 (1). Kathmandu: 11, 23. ISSN 0034-348X.
- Parker, John (2005) [1999]. The Gurkhas: The Inside Story of The World's Most Feared Soldiers. London: Headline Book Publishing. ISBN 9780755314157.
- Pemble, John (2009). "Forgetting and remembering Britain's Gurkha War". Asian Affairs. 40 (3): 361–376. doi:10.1080/03068370903195154. S2CID 159606340.
- Prinsep, Henry Thoby (1825). History of the Political and Military Transactions in India During the Administration of the Marquess of Hastings, 1813–1823. Vol. 1. London: Kingsbury, Parbury & Allen. OCLC 152785969.
- Smith, Thomas (1852). Narrative of a Five Year's Residence at Nepal. Vol. 1. London: Colburn and Co. OCLC 16835962.
- Thorn, William (1816). A Memoir of Major-General Sir R.R. Gillespie. London: Printed for T. Egerton. OCLC 4185876.
