= Pulachaur =

Pulachaur पुलाचौर
- Location in Nepal Pulachaur (Nepal)
- Coordinates: 28.37°N 83.52°E
- Country: Nepal
- Zone: Dhaulagiri Zone
- District: Myagdi District

Population (1991)
  - Total: 3,394
- Time zone: UTC+5:45 (Nepal Time)

Pulachaur is a market center in Beni Municipality in Myagdi District in the Dhaulagiri Zone of western-central Nepal. The former village development committee was annexed to form the new municipality on May 18, 2014. At the time of the 1991 Nepal census it had a population of 3394 people living in 736 individual households.
