= Shree Amarsingh Model Higher Secondary School =

Shree Amar Singh Secondary School
- श्री अमरसिँह माध्यमिक विद्यालय
- Soldier's Board Vocational Training High School
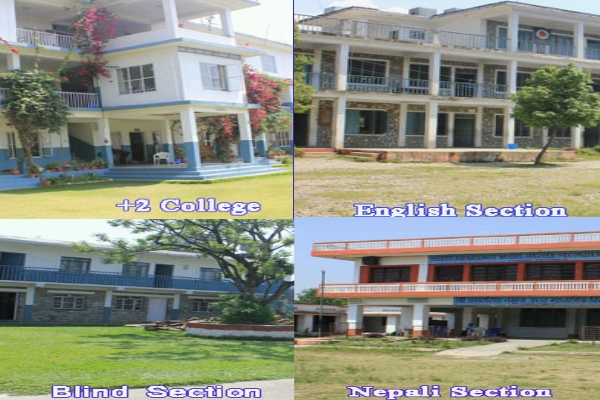
- Amarsingh Secondary

Location
- Amarsingh Chowk; Pokhara, Gandaki Province 33700; Nepal

Information
- School type: Government School
- Motto: Education for All Round Development
- Established: ( 2013 Chaitra 13th BS) 26 March 1957
- Founders: Late Sub. Major Bir Singh Grg and Late Mukhiya Dev Raj Ghimire
- School district: Kaski
- Educational authority: Government of Nepal
- Principal: Balaram Pokhrel
- Academic Dean: Surendra Adhikari
- 10+2 Morning Section Incharge: Indra Prasad Bhusal
- English Section Incharge: Madhav Raj Ghimire
- Staff: 134 (governmental) + 20 (private)
- Faculty: 4
- Grades: 14
  - Kindergarten: 129
  - Grade 1: 99
  - Grade 2: 91
  - Grade 3: 104
  - Grade 4: 132
  - Grade 5: 151
  - Grade 6: 207
  - Grade 7: 210
  - Grade 8: 228
  - Grade 9: 220
  - Grade 10: 231
  - Grade 11: 412
  - Grade 12: 415
- Classes: 14
- Classes offered: Nursery to XII
- Language: English
- Hours in school day: 5 am to 7 pm
- Area: 207 Ropani
- Website: amv.edu.np

Shree Amarsingh Secondary School (referred to as ASS) (Nepali: श्री अमरसिँह माध्यमिक विद्यालय) is a secondary school opened from amount collected from the post-war reconstruction fund established after World War II as Soldier's Board Vocational Training High School on March 26, 1957. After 10 years it was handed over to Government of Nepal on September 14, 1966, and given its present name.

== Introduction ==
Braille medium (established : 1981 A.D), English medium (established : 1985 A.D) and Plus-two stream (established 1999 A.D) are the sections of this institution.
The school was awarded as Model Higher Secondary School in 2004 A.D, Best National in 2006 A.D, Regional Best Community Higher School in 2005 AD, 2007 AD and 2008 AD. This school has four different faculties for 10+2: Science, Management, Education and Humanities.

It is located in Amarsingh Chowk, Pokhara, Nepal.

The motto of the school is "Always Aim High"

== Courses ==
- Secondary Education Examination (SEE) (nationwide curriculum until Class 10, under the Ministry of Education, Nepal)
- 10+2 in Science, Management, Education, Humanities Stream (National Education Board (NEB), Sano Thimi, Nepal)

== Administration ==
- Mr. Balaram Pokharel - Headmaster
- Mr. Sudip Acharya - Asst. Headmaster
- Mr. Udaya Raj Pokharel - Matri Section Incharge
- Mr. Madhav Raj Ghimire - English Section Incharge
- Mr. Naresh Nepal - Blind Section Incharge
- Mrs. Runa Shrestha - Science Section Incharge
- Mrs. Tara Kumari Kunwar - Accountant
- Mr. Niranjan Lohani - Office Assistant
- Mrs. Anita Paudel - Asst. Librarian
- Mr. Tek Bdr. Gurung - Lab Assistant (Physics)
- Mr. Chiran Giri - Lab Technician (Zoology)
- Mr. Daya Raj Pun - Lab Technician (Chemistry)

== Scholarship Program ==
School Provides a wide range of scholarships to deserving students who fulfill the given criteria. However an admitted student can receive only one type of scholarship:

- SEE Grade Scholarship
- Entrance Exam Scholarship
- Scholarship for Handicapped students
- Students Welfare Fund Scholarship
- Terminal Exam Scholarship
- Dalit Scholarship

== Admission ==
Students who have passed SEE are eligible to apply for admission in Class XI (Science / Management / Humanities / Education). The applications are to be duly filled in application forms available from the school office with all supporting documents within the given deadline. All applicants are required to appear for the entrance test conducted by the school. Students who are shortlisted based on their performance in the entrance test will be called for an interview. Final admission is granted on the basis of merit, taking into account the student’s SEE marks, entrance test scores, and interview performance.

== Teaching Methodology ==
The school incorporates diversity in teaching, questioning, explaining, modeling and demonstrating. Teachers adopt a flexible approach with multiple learning styles to help students retain information and strengthen understanding. Effective teaching learning methods reinforced by the use of technology in the school bring out critical thinking and a desire to learn.

== Laboratory ==
The school has laboratories for Physics, Chemistry, Zoology, Botany and Computer. Students use them for practical work related to their lessons.

== Representatives of school ==
-: School Representative: Pranjal Poudel

-: Class Representative 12:

- Progresh Acharya
- Roshni Baral
- Milan Pokhrel
- Ram Bhattarai
- Bigam Malla Thakuri
- Sudikashya K.C
- Sudarshan G.C
- Karuna B.K
