= Thapapur =

Thapapur थापापुर
- Village development committee
- Location in Nepal
- Coordinates: 28.50°N 81.02°E
- Country: Nepal
- Zone: Seti Zone
- District: Kailali District

Population (1991)
  - Total: 9,909
- Time zone: UTC+5:45 (Nepal Time)

Thapapur is a village development committee in Kailali District in the Seti Zone of western Nepal. At the time of the 1991 Nepal census it had a population of 9,909 living in 1,295 individual households.
