= Amrabad, Kerman =

Amrabad عمراباد
- Village
- Location within Iran
- Coordinates: 30°37′06″N 54°53′31″E
- Country: Iran
- Province: Kerman
- County: Shahr-e Babak
- Bakhsh: Dehaj
- Rural District: Dehaj

Population (2006)
  - Total: 110
- Time zone: UTC+3:30 (IRST)
  - Summer (DST): UTC+4:30 (IRDT)

Amrabad (Persian: عمراباد, also Romanized as ‘Amrābād; also known as ‘Amrūābād and Umrāo) is a village in Dehaj Rural District, Dehaj District, Shahr-e Babak County, Kerman Province, Iran. At the 2006 census, its population was 110, in 27 families.
