= Robert Rollo Gillespie =

British Army officer

Major-General Sir Robert Rollo Gillespie KCB
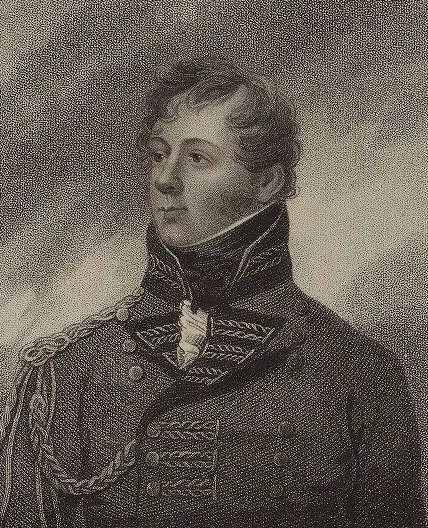
- Portrait by Henry Cook, 1814

British Lieutenant-Governor of the Dutch East Indies
- Acting
- In office 9 August 1811 – 18 September 1811
- Appointed by: Earl of Minto
- Monarch: George III
- Preceded by: Jan Willem Janssens (as Governor-General under French rule)
- Succeeded by: Stamford Raffles

Personal details
- Born: Hugh Robert Rollo Gillespie; 21 January 1766 Comber, Kingdom of Ireland
- Died: 31 October 1814 (aged 48) Dehradun, Kingdom of Nepal
- Resting place: Meerut Cantonment Cemetery, Uttar Pradesh
- Spouse: Annabella Taylor (m. 1786)
- Children: Rollo Gillespie Jr. (son)
- Parent: Robert Gillespie (father)

Military service
- Allegiance: United Kingdom
- Branch/service: British Army
- Years of service: 1783–1814
- Rank: Major-General
- Battles/wars: French Revolutionary Wars; Vellore Sepoy Mutiny; British invasion of Java; Anglo-Nepalese War; Battle of Nalapani †
- Memorials: St Paul's Cathedral, London, England; Comber, County Down, Northern Ireland

Major-General Sir Hugh Robert Rollo Gillespie (21 January 1766 – 31 October 1814) was an officer in the British Army. The Army's historian Sir John Fortescue called him "The bravest man ever to wear a red coat".

== Early life ==
Hugh Robert Rollo Gillespie was born on 21 January 1766 and grew up in Comber, County Down, in what is now Northern Ireland. He was educated at Kensington and near Newmarket After turning down the opportunity of going to Cambridge University he joined the 3rd Irish Horse during 1783 as a Cornet.

On 24 November 1786, Gillespie secretly married Annabella Taylor, the fourth daughter of Thomas Taylor of Taylor Grange, Co. in the county of Dublin, they would later had a son whom also named after him. In 1787 he accompanied the regiment to Athy. There he was involved in a duel in which he killed the opposing duellist. Fleeing to a friend's house in Narraghmore and then to Scotland, he returned voluntarily to stand trial in 1788. The verdict was 'justifiable homicide' and Gillespie was acquitted. Later he earned the title "Strongest Man of Comber" after performing many feats of strength.

== Active service ==
In 1792 he transferred to the 20th Light Dragoons with the rank of lieutenant and soon embarked with his new regiment for Jamaica. However, his ship was shipwrecked at the Portuguese islands of Madeira forcing Gillespie to come ashore by a small boat and he then contracted yellow fever in his first night on the island. After recovery, he rejoined his regiment and fought against the forces of the French Republic in the Caribbean at Tiburon Peninsula, Port-au-Prince, Fort Bizotten and Fort de l'Hôpital.

Being made Adjutant-General of St. Domingo, he was at home alone when eight men broke into his house to burgle it. Armed only with his sword, he killed six of them while the other two fled.

=== India, Java, Sumatra, Nepal ===
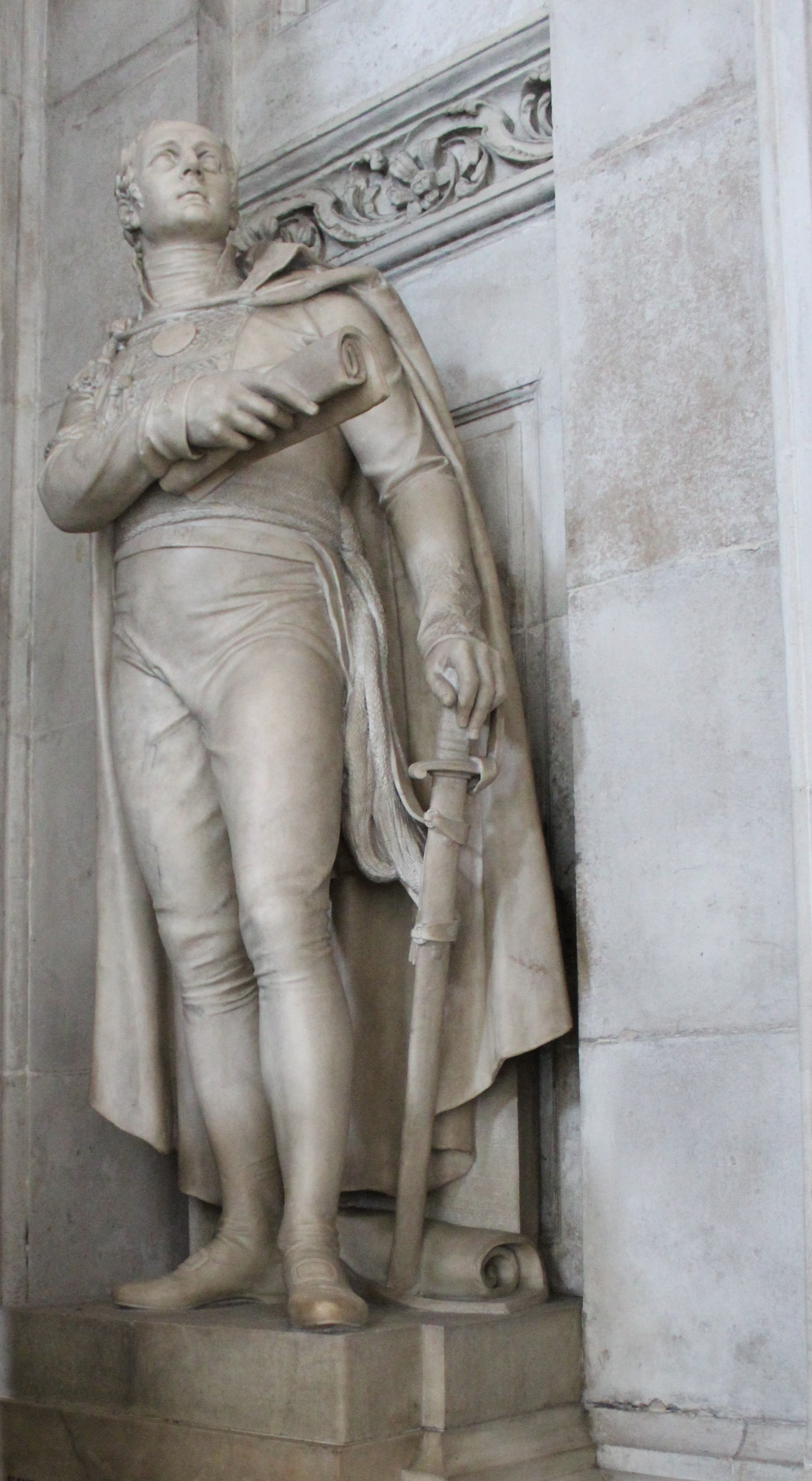
Statue of Robert Rollo Gillespie, St Paul's Cathedral, London

In 1804 he was honourably acquitted by a court martial of suspected involvement in a fraud scandal – he had permitted the regimental surgeons, in the interests of their patients, to exceed the regulation allowances. At his court martial it was pointed out that these regulations did not necessarily apply to a regiment which was paid not by the British government, but by the local government of Jamaica, which already had passed his accounts; many of its members and his senior officers wrote letters to the court martial highly commending him and his care for his regiment.

He then transferred to India, traveling initially to Hamburg where, though both were in disguise and had no political principles in common, he was warned by Napper Tandy to flee to Danish territory in Altona. He continued overland through Germany, Austria, and Serbia, to the Euxine where he felt obliged to force his ship's captain at gunpoint to take him to Constantinople as agreed, rather than a corsair port for murder or slavery. He passed through Greece without recorded incidents, and took ship for Aleppo. In the desert, he narrowly saved his own life, and his servant's, by curing the chief of a band of Arabs who were planning to murder and rob him. He stayed for some time in Baghdad, where he was presented with a valuable Arabian horse by the Ottoman governor. From Basra he took ship for Bombay, then travelled overland to Madras. He was soon appointed to the command of the 19th Dragoons at Arcot, some 16 miles from Vellore.

A few days after taking up his new post, Gillespie was warned of the Vellore Mutiny of 1806. He immediately collected about twenty dragoons, with galloper guns, and he set out ahead of a relief force within a quarter of an hour of the alarm being raised. Dashing ahead of his men, he arrived at Vellore within two hours, to find the surviving British troops within minutes of extinction by some hundreds of mutineers. About sixty men of the 69th, commanded by Sergeant Brady (who recognized Gillespie from the West Indies) and by two assistant surgeons, were holding the ramparts but were out of ammunition. Gillespie was unable to gain entry through the gate (which was controlled by the mutineers), so the sergeant lowered a chain of soldier's belts to allow Gillespie to climb the wall onto the battlements. To gain time for the rest of his men to arrive Gillespie led the 69th in a bayonet-charge along the ramparts, engaging in close combat with the enemy. With the rest of the 19th arrived, Gillespie ordered them to blow in the gates with their galloper guns and then made a second charge with the 69th, clearing the space just inside the gate to permit the cavalry to deploy. The 19th and Madras Cavalry then charged and slaughtered any enemy who stood in their way; about a hundred fugitives, captured within the fort, were summarily executed. Gillespie arrested the sons of Tipu Sultan, who were suspected of fomenting the mutiny, and sent them under guard to Madras. The mutiny was thus suppressed.

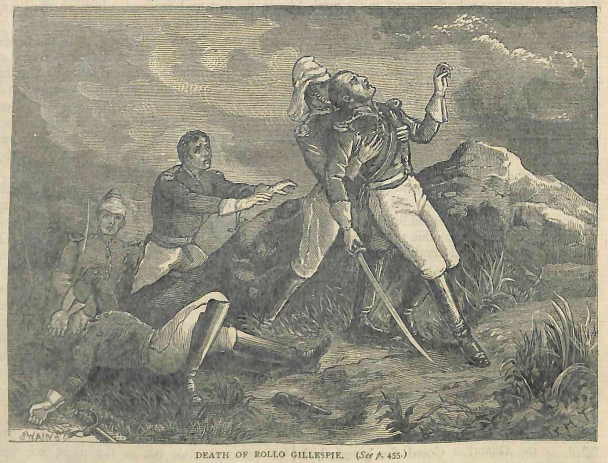
Death of Rollo Gillespie (Cassell's illustrated history of India, 1890)

In 1811 he commanded forces in the Invasion of Java and took the city of Batavia. He was subsequently appointed Commander of the Forces in British-occupied Java and in 1812 he deposed the Sultan of Palembang in Sumatra, and took and plundered the royal Javanese city of Yogyakarta, receiving as his share of the plunder a sum of 74,000 Spanish dollars. On his return to India he speared a tiger that escaped from a cage and prowled on Bangalore racecourse.

Two years later, at the beginning of the Anglo-Nepalese War, he led a column to attack a Nepalese hill fort at Khalanga, in the Battle of Nalapani, repulsing a Gorkha counter-attack. Gillespie then tried to follow them back into the fort with a dismounted party of the 8th Dragoons. Although this failed, Gillespie renewed the attack with companies of the 53rd Foot. Thirty yards from the fort he shouted the words, "One shot more for the honour of Down" and charged with the men when a Nepalese sharpshooter shot him through the heart and he died within seconds of falling. With his death the attack faltered causing the next senior officer to call a retreat.

He was posthumously knighted with a K.C.B. on 1 January 1815.

== Memorials ==
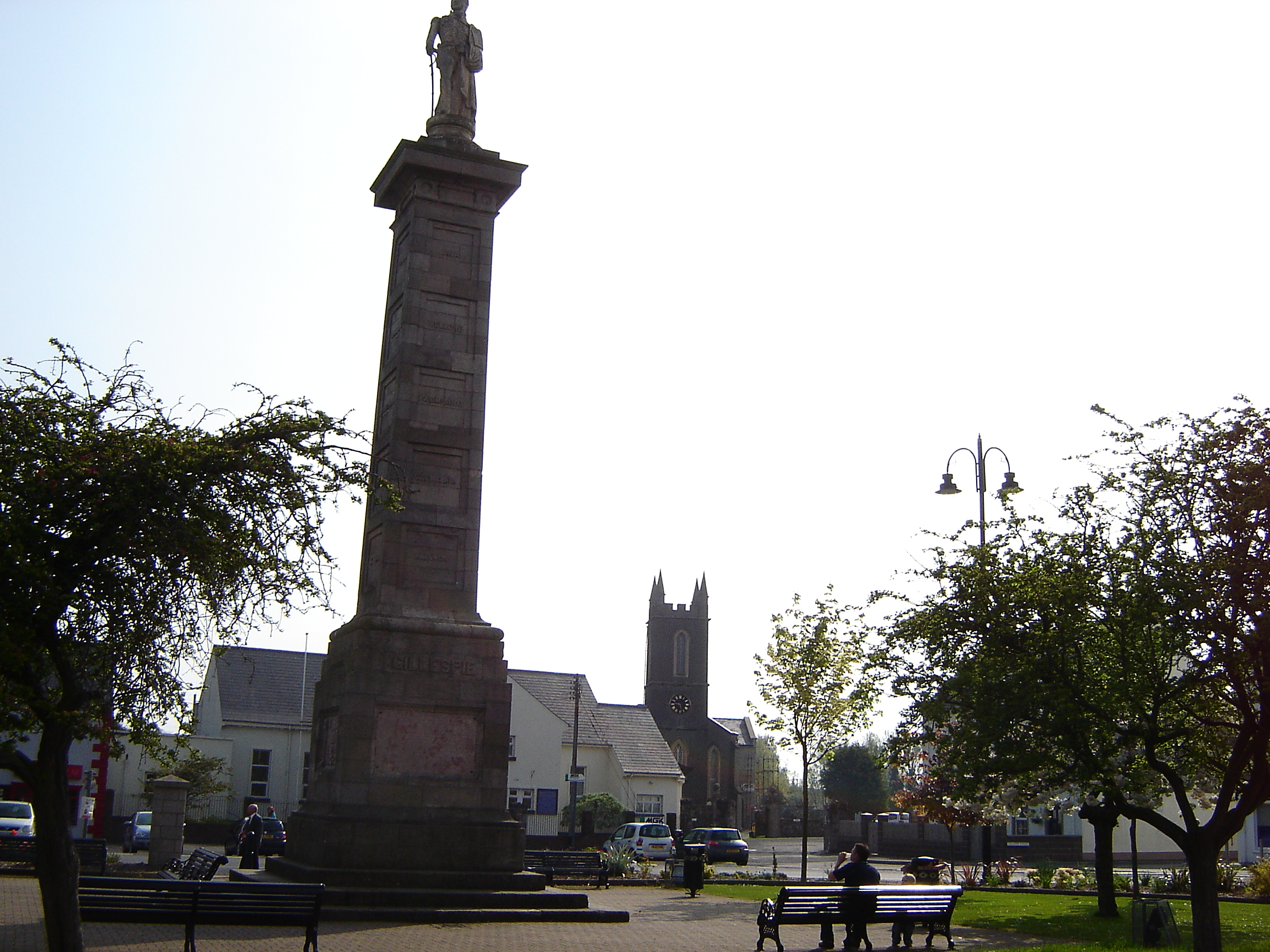
The Gillespie Memorial

A large statue of Major General Sir Robert Rollo Gillespie was constructed under the oversight of John Fraser, the first county surveyor of Down, and was unveiled on 24 June 1845 (St. John's Day) in the Town Square of Comber. Fifty lodges of the Masonic Order were present, in what is believed to be the biggest Masonic gathering in Irish history. It was calculated that 25,000 to 30,000 people crowded into the town to witness the ceremony and celebrate the life of "The Strongest Man in Comber". The column is 55 feet high. At the foot of the column are many Masonic symbols and his famous last words "One shot more for the honour of Down".

There is a memorial statue of Gillespie in St Paul's Cathedral, London by Francis Chantrey which was erected in 1826.

Political offices
Preceded by Jan Willem Janssens as Governor-General	Lieutenant-Governor of the Dutch East Indies (acting); 1811	Succeeded by Thomas Stamford Raffles
