= National Hero of Nepal =

National Heroes of Nepal (Nepali: नेपालका राष्ट्रिय विभूतिहरू, romanized: Nepalka Rashtriya Bibhutiharu) is a list of 18 Nepali people, including those from ancient and medieval times, who were selected to their ranks posthumously by a commission headed by famous writer Balkrishna Sama who was appointed by King Mahendra, in 1955. The commission was directed to make nominations on the basis of their contributions to the nation, its influence and consequences. On these accounts, the commission nominated individuals for their contributions to the pride of the nation, be it in religious, cultural or economic reforms, wartime bravery, promoting the cause of democracy, literature and architecture.

The title National Heroes of Nepal is only offered posthumously and is not a regular title or award, but conferred only upon the discussions of the commission now led by Nepal Academy.

On 20 June 2022, the government of Nepal declared Jaya Prithvi Bahadur Singh as a national hero. His is also the most recent nomination as a national hero.

== List of national heroes of Nepal ==
The 18 national heroes of Nepal are:

1. Gautam Buddha
2. Amshuvarma
3. Sita
4. Janaka
5. Araniko
6. Ram Shah
7. Amar Singh Thapa
8. Prithvi Narayan Shah
9. Bhanubhakta Acharya
10. Bhimsen Thapa
11. Balbhadra Kunwar
12. Tribhuvan Bir Bikram Shah
13. Motiram Bhatta
14. Sankhadhar Sakhwa
15. Pasang Lhamu Sherpa
16. Phalgunanda
17. Bhakti Thapa
18. Jaya Prithvi Bahadur Singh
