= Ranajor Singh Thapa =

Sri Kaji Ranajor Singh Thapa
- श्री काजी रणजोर थापा

Personal details
- Relations: Ranadhoj Thapa (brother)
- Parent: Amar Singh Thapa (father)

Military service
- Allegiance: Nepal
- Branch/service: Nepali Army
- Rank: Colonel
- Battles/wars: Anglo-Nepalese war

Ranajor Singh Thapa anglicised as Ranjore Thapa (Nepali: रणजोर सिंह थापा) was governor of Kumaun and Garhwal and commander of Jaithak Fort during Anglo-Nepalese war at Battle of Jaithak. He was born to General Bada Kaji Amar Singh Thapa. His brother Ranadhoj Thapa served as deputy to Prime Minister Bhimsen Thapa.

Ranajor Singh set up position at Jaithak overlooking Nahan. On the night of 25 December, British and Indian native sepoys climbed to get into better position to attack at Ranajor Singh's forces. Major Ludlow, who led the attack up the southern slope of the ridge, left the camp at midnight and came first upon the enemy. But the Nepalese thwarted British down the mountain side. Ludlow fell in with Ranajor Singh's outer picquet at three in the morning, at about a mile's distance from the point to be occupied.

Major General Martindell ordered retreat and first war ended. When General Ochterlony came up with heavy forces and modern equipments, Nepalese were losing out. Badakaji Amar Singh Thapa was reluctant to surrender but then came the letter of fall of Almora by Governor of Kumaun, Bam Shah. Ranajor Singh lost connection completely from his father and from Central Nepal. He was hopelessly and rigidly defending the position. By the time Grand Old Man Bhakti Thapa and position of Almoda fell, his father had to surrender with no support from Capital Kathmandu. Ranajor Singh on second campaign linked up at Sindhuli Gadhi in support of his father.
