= Sudarshan Shah =

Ruler of Garhwal Uttarakhand

- Portrait of Sudarshan Shan
- Reign: 1804–1859
- Successor: Pratap Shah; Kirti Shah; Narendra Shah
- Died: 1859
- Spouse: Maharani Khaneti
- House: Garhwal Kingdom
- Father: Pradyumna Shah

Sudarshan Shah, also known as Raja Sudarshan Shah of Garhwal Kingdom, was the ruler and the founder of modern-day New Tehri city of Tehri district. He ruled the kingdom between 1804 and 1859. British army aided the king in reigning the territory after the royal army was defeated by Gorkha forces during the Battle of Khurbura.

== Background and life ==
After Sudarshan's father was killed in the battle of Khurbura, Sudarshan was not yet a grown adult. Sudarshan was captured by the invaders until British forces defeated Gorkhas and later freed him. He was then crowned as the king of Tehri, where he began his reign under the influence of British forces. Shah was married to the sister of Aniruddh Chand of Kangra in 1831; however, he died without having a son.

== Administration ==
Sudarshan was a wise ruler and he shifted his capital from Srinagar, Uttarakhand to Tehri; the latter is covered by the hills and rivers. Before the establishment of the new capital, there were no buildings in the area. He constructed the first building called "Purana Durbar Hall", where he used to carry out administrative reforms.
