= Battle of Khurbura =

1804 battle in India

Date	14 May 1804 – 26 May 1804 (13 days)
Location	Khurbura, Dehradun, India 30.3256°N 78.0267°E
Result	Kingdom of Nepal victory: End of the Garhwal Kingdom
Territorial changes	Garhwal Kingdom annexed by the Gorkhas

Belligerents
Garhwal Kingdom	Kingdom of Nepal

Commanders and leaders
King Pradyumna Shah †; Parakram Shah; Pritam Shah; Ram dayal Singh Gujjar; Sudarshan Shah	Amar Singh Thapa; Ranajit Kunwar; Chandrabir Kunwar; Bam (Brahma) Shah

Strength
10,000–12,000	14,000

Battle of Khurbura or Battle of Khudbuda also known as Gorkha-Garhwal War occurred in May 1804 near modern-day village of Dehradun, Khurbura 30.3256°N 78.0267°E. The battle is regarded as the first major attack in the history of Garhwal Kingdom that triggered between Kingdom of Nepal forces and Maharaja Pradyumna Shah, and continued for 13 days until the Garhwal king was defeated. It is chiefly regarded the only defeat of Pradyumna Shah's life and the victory of Gorkhali forces under Kingdom of Nepal.

== Background ==
Garhwali officials believed that the Garhwal dynasty was nearing its end. They believed it was due to the curses of queens of Salim Shah and Jaya Kirti Shah. With the beginning of this battle, the kingdom came under the rule of Gorkhas until 1814. Gurkha forces, loaded with guns entered in "Khurbura" to invade the territory. Since Garhwal's soldiers were fighting against the Nepalese invaders with swords, the kingdom was defeated heavily that led the opposition forces to begin their rule.

== Battle ==
Since the kingdom was already shattered and unstable due to the 1803 Garhwal earthquake and the entire kingdom was yet to reinstate. With great difficulty due to unstable circumstances caused by earthquake, Maharaja Pradyuman Shah first moved to Srinagar, Uttarakhand to Dehradun and then to Saharanpur arranging the forces to combat Gorkhas. The king succeeded arranging 10,000 soldiers. However, they were much untrained. King Pradyumna Shah of Garhwal Kingdom prepared for warfare by assembling 12,000 men under a Gujjar Raja Ramdayal Singh of Landhaura. On the other hand, Gorkhali forces were led by overall commander 'Bada Kaji' Amar Singh Thapa, and his subordinate commanders Kaji Ranajit Kunwar (the grandfather of the Rana Prime Minister Maharaja Jung Bahadur Kunwar Rana)and Bhaktibir Thapa. The battle took place at Khadbuda about a half mile from the palace of Guru Ram Raya on 22nd Marga 1860 V.S. (January 1804). Pradyumna Shah on his horseback was having a conversation with Miya Dulal Singh of Prithvipur and momentarily, Kaji Ranajit Kunwar shot Pradyumna Shah to death. His shot proved successful as Garhwali soldiers ran away and the war finally ended.

== Aftermath ==
Son of King Pradyumna, Prince Sudarshan Shah, along with Commander Devi Singh fled to Kanakhal with some soldiers. The King's brother, Parakram Shah, fled to his father-in-law's place in Hindur, Nalagarh without caring for funeral rites of the deceased king. Soon after his death, King's another brother, Pritam Shah, was incarcerated by the Gorkhas where he passed his life under many hardships and poverty. The Gorkhali commander Amar Singh sent the body of King Pradyumna Shah to Haridwar with great honors under the protection of Surajan Singh Rawal of Dalanwala and some Gorkhali soldiers. Bada Amar Simha appointed Kaji Ranajit Kunwar as chief of one of the three revenue divisions of Garhwal namely Srinagar.

Khurbura was an important place in Garhwal kingdom and now its the only a small village that has left remarkable history behind. This area is now administered by the Dehradun authorities of Uttarakhand state.

== Books ==
- Acharya, Baburam (1 January 1971), "The Fall Of Bhimsen Thapa And The Rise Of Jung Bahadur Rana" (PDF), Regmi Research Series, 3 (1): 13–25
- Dabaral, Shiva Prasad "Charan" (March 1987a), "The Rape of Garhwal" (PDF), Regmi Research Series, 19 (3): 37–40
- Dabaral, Shiva Prasad "Charan" (July–August 1987b), "Gorkhali rule in Garhwal" (PDF), Regmi Research Series, 19 (7–8): 115–120
