= Chandrabir Kunwar =

Governor and military commander in the Kingdom of Nepal

Sardar Chandrabir Kunwar
- श्री सरदार चन्द्रवीर कुँवर

Personal details
- Died: Baisakh month, 1871 V.S. (1814 A.D.) bank of Ganga river, Garhwal division, Kingdom of Nepal (present-day Uttarakhand, India)
- Children: Balbhadra Kunwar; Birbhadra Kunwar
- Parent: Jaya Krishna Kunwar (father)
- Relatives: see Kunwar family

Military service
- Allegiance: Nepal
- Battles/wars: Western Campaigns of Unification of Nepal

Chandrabir Kunwar (Nepali: चन्द्रवीर कुँवर) or Chandra Bir Kunwar Chhetri also spelled Chandravir, Chandraveer was a governor and military commander in the Kingdom of Nepal. He was born to Jaya Krishna Kunwar of Gorkha-based Kunwar family and was a nephew of the famed Gorkhali Sardar Ramakrishna Kunwar. He married the sister of Kaji Ranjor Thapa and was a son-in-law of his superior commander Amar Singh Thapa. He fought at the 1803 conquest of Garhwal Kingdom and the final battle of Garhwal on 1805 A.D. where King Pradyumna Shah died. During his lifetime, he served as the Subba (Governor) of Doti and one-third territories of Garhwal province in the Kingdom of Nepal. He was also the father of the renowned battle hero Balbhadra Kunwar of Nalapani.

== Early life ==
He was born to Jaya Krishna Kunwar, a son of Ashiram Kunwar. He was a resident of Bhanwarkot in Kavrepalanchowk District. He married sister of Kaji Ranajor Thapa and was a son-in-law of Bada Amar Singh Thapa

== Career ==
Chandra Bir Kunwar was appointed as Subba (i.e. governor) of Pyuthan in around 1844/45 Vikram Samvat. After 1844/45 Vikram Samvat, Chandrabir lived continuously in the hill region. Initially, Chandra Bir was deputed with a responsibility to build forts for the Gorkhali Army. The royal orders of Ashwin Badi 13, 1851 states that he was the Subedar of the Kalidatta Company before Mahavir Bista.

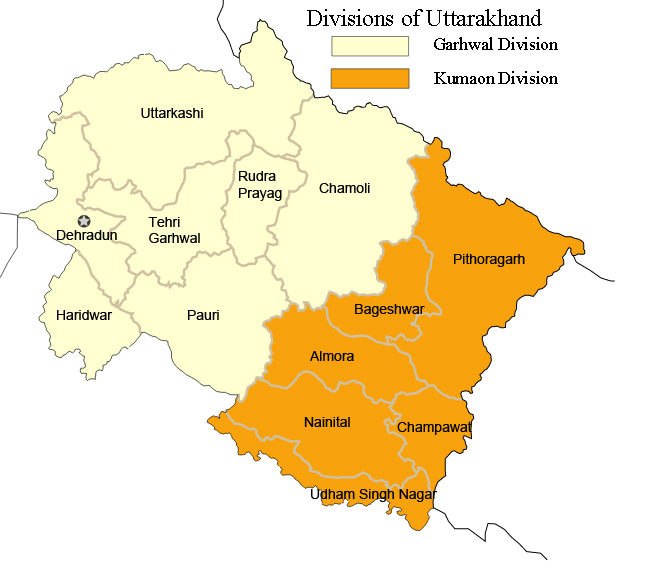
Garhwal division in whitish grey, Chandrabir governed the one-third territories of the region

After 3 weeks of the earthquake on 8 September 1803, Gorkhali forces saw an opportunity to conquer Garhwal Kingdom. The Gorkhali forces marched toward Srinagar from three directions. Chandrabir Kunwar together with his co-commander Bhaktibir Thapa led the so-called second unit of Gorkhali forces through Langurgarh route. Eventually, King Pradyumna Shah escaped with Parakram Shah to Doon valley, however, the Gorkhalis also occupied the Doon valley in Ashwin 1860 (October 1803). Governors Ranadhir Singh Basnyat and Hastadal Shah who had differences with Amar Singh Thapa were replaced by Surabir Khatri, Ranabir Khatri, Dhaukal Khatri and Chandrabir Kunwar. Chandra Bir was appointed as Subba (governor) of one-third territories of Garhwal and in replacement of Hasti Dal Shah. The appointment letter dated Ashadh Badi 2, 1862 Vikram Samvat states him to reach Srinagar and act according to the orders of Bada Kaji Amar Singh Thapa. (Note: Royal Orders on Ashadh Badi 2, 1862 Vikram Samvat: We have received reports that the bhardars sent (to Garh) were not on good terms with each other. We have, therefore, appointed Surabir Khatri, Ranabir Khatri, and Dhaukal Khatri to replaced Ranadhir. Ranabir Khatri is still along with the troops. We have sent an order to Surabir Khatri; he too will join the troops soon. We have appointed you to replace Hastadal. We have ordered Bal Kunwar to take over charge of shawls, pagaris, and the letter of appointment (patta) on your behalf; these will reach you in due time. Kaji Ambar Simha Thapa is old and mature, and also true to his salt. Act according to his advice. Proceed to Srinagar quickly and make necessary arrangements for the administration of that territory in consultation with the Kaji and other bhardars. We shall send other instructions later.) According to the Bhasha Vamshavali, Chandrabir Kanwar also participated in the last battle of Garhwal which took place in 1862 Vikram Samvat. The war resulted in the defeat of King Pradyumna Shah.

Two years after appointed as Subba (governor) of Garhwal, he was transferred to Doti region. He was appointed as governor of hill, Madhesh and Bhot divisions of Doti region by the royal letter dated Bhadra Sudi 11, 1864. On this tenure, he was authorized with Khangi emoluments of NRs. 3500 and coin minting rights at Doti. Furthermore, he was authorized with autonomous revenue collection, payments to various military companies, Fouzdars and Peskars. (Note: Royal order to Chandrabir Kanwar, grandson of Ashiram Kanwar, and son of Jaya Krishna Kanwar, resident of Bhawarkot (Kabhrepalanchok): We hereby appoint you Subba of the Bhot, Madhesh, and hill regions of Doti, replacing Narau Shahi. The company stationed at Doti is also hereby placed under your command. You shall be entitled to Khangi emoluments amounting to Rs. 3,500. Allot the lands marked by Puran Shahi to eight companies according to the prescribed schedules. On lands in excess of these allotments, as well as your own Khangi lands, do not collect unauthorized taxes, or make collections at enhanced rates, but keep the people satisfied. Mint coins according to the designs that had been approved previously. Collect revenues from all customary sources in that area, including land taxes (mal), customs duties (sair), taxes on river (Jalkar) and forest (banker) products, as well as bihadani, Sangudha, judicial fines and penalties (danda-kunda), escheats (maryo-aputali), rahata-bahata, mines, taxes on kurya-akariya (?), sobado, kachho, and sirto. Appoint your own men to dispose of cases relating to panchakhat crimes and collect fines and penalties. We approve administrative expenses (masaland) as during the time of Subba Naru Shahi. Spend money for such purposes in a reasonable manner. Revenue from buried treasure (kalyanadhana), Dharmadhikara levies, and any new taxes that may be imposed by the palace, darshan-bhet revenues not assigned to any company, and revenue from lands under Khalisa tenure shall be used to pay additional emoluments to those companies of Doti that have been deputed to Kangra so long as they remain there, meet losses resulting from floods and washouts, reasonable emoluments of Fouzdars and Peskars according to royal orders, and reasonable expenses on religious ceremonies and other purposes. The surplus revenues, if any, shall be transmitted to the Tosakhana (Treasury). Submit accounts at the end of each year and obtain clearance. Remain on constant duty with full assurance and loyalty. Bhadra Sudi 11, 1864)

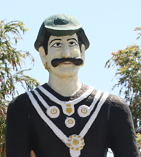
Bada Kaji Amar Singh Thapa, Overall Commander of the Western region of Kingdom of Nepal

The royal orders on Kartik Badi 1, 1865 Vikram Samvat shows Chandrabir as Sardar in Garhaun together with Parashuram Thapa for a brief period. After his tenure as governor of Doti, he was later called back to Garhwal. Chandrabir together with Sardar Bhakti Thapa and Subba Shrestha Thapa were deputed in Garhwal regions per royal orders on Jestha Badi 9, 1866 (May 1809). The orders instructed them to demarcate a land yielding NRs. 1200 at Dasauli for maintaining a Sadavarta (pilgrim feeding place). The Sadavarta was made for pilgrims visiting the famed Badrinath Temple. Additionally, they were authorized to appoint Fouzdar for revenue collection in Doon valley and apportion the total revenue on their own jurisdiction as per letter dated Baisakh Sudi 3, 1866 (April 1809). Similarly, they were instructed through the same letter to maintain a check post for preventing the sale of children and not to impart injustices in any case.

== Death ==
Chandravir Kunwar died at the banks of Ganga on early 1871 Vikram Samvat (1814 A.D). The death of Chandravir Kunwar was reported by his brother-in-law Kaji Ranajor Thapa to King Girvan Yuddha Bikram Shah through letter dated Baisakh Sudi 7, 1871 Vikram Samvat (April/May 1814). The reply letter from King Girvan Yuddha was written on Jestha Sudi 4, 1871 Vikram Samvat (May 1814 A.D.). The response letter from King Girvan states that one of his two sons was deputed to build the Nalapani fort while the other was deputed to remain at Nahan.

== Land Grants ==
He received rice lands amounting 300 muris on Manachamal tenure through a royal order issued in Aswin Badi 13, 1862.

== Descendants ==
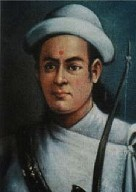
Balabhadra Kunwar, son of Chandravir and hero of the Battle of Nalapani

His son Balabhadra Kunwar was highly praised for his military skill for the defence of the Nalapani fort. His another son Birabhadra Kunwar was military commander in Kumaun and Kangra front (1809 A.D.) as well as governor of Garhwal.

== Sources ==
- Acharya, Baburam (January 1, 1971) [1950], "King Girban's Letter To Kaji Ranjor Thapa" (PDF), Regmi Research Series, 3 (1): 3–5
- Pauw, E.K. (February 1, 1971) [1896], "Gorkhali Rule in Garhwal" (PDF), Regmi Research Series, 3 (2): 44–50
- Pant, Mahesh Raj (August 1, 1973) [1972], "Disguised English Travellers In Nepal And Tibet" (PDF), Regmi Research Series, 5 (8): 148–159
- Regmi, Mahesh Chandra (January 1, 1986a), "Royal Orders of Kartik Badi 1, 1865" (PDF), Regmi Research Series, 18 (1): 1–5
- Regmi, Mahesh Chandra (May 1, 1986b), "The Badrinath Temple" (PDF), Regmi Research Series, 18 (5): 75–76
- Regmi, Mahesh Chandra (December 1, 1986c), "Subba Chandrabir Kanwar of Doti" (PDF), Regmi Research Series, 18 (12): 185–186
- Dabaral, Shiva Prasad ‘’Charan’’ (February 1987a), "The Rape of Garhwal" (PDF), Regmi Research Series, 19 (2): 25–30
- Regmi, Mahesh Chandra (April 1987a), "Garhwal Appointment, A.D. 1805" (PDF), Regmi Research Series, 19 (4): 46–48
- Dabaral, Shiva Prasad ‘’Charan’’ (April 1987b), "From the Yamuna to the Sutlej" (PDF), Regmi Research Series, 19 (4): 50–54
- Regmi, Mahesh Chandra (September–October 1987b), "Gorkhali Rule in Garhwal" (PDF), Regmi Research Series, 19 (9–10): 143–150
- Regmi, Mahesh Chandra (November–December 1987c), "Doon Valley Affairs, A.D. 1809" (PDF), Regmi Research Series, 19 (11–12): 159
- Regmi, Mahesh Chandra (November–December 1987d), "Selected Documents of Ashwin 1862" (PDF), Regmi Research Series, 19 (11–12): 175–180
- Regmi, Mahesh Chandra (April 1988a), "Miscellaneous Documents of Marga Sudi 1, 1865" (PDF), Regmi Research Series, 20 (4): 46–47
- Regmi, Mahesh Chandra (April 1988b), "The Kalidatta Company" (PDF), Regmi Research Series, 20 (4): 56–57
- Regmi, Mahesh Chandra (June–July 1988c), "Religious Endowments in Kumaun and Garhwal" (PDF), Regmi Research Series, 20 (6–7): 76–78
