= Garhwal division =

Administrative division of Uttarakhand, India

Garhwal Garhdesh Kedarkhand
- Administrative division
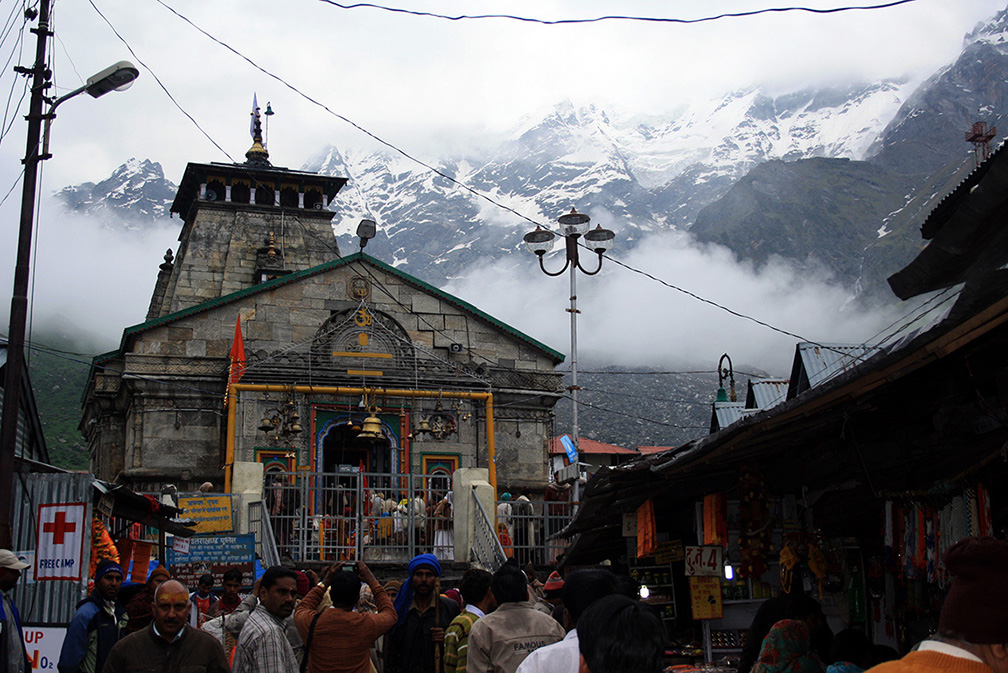
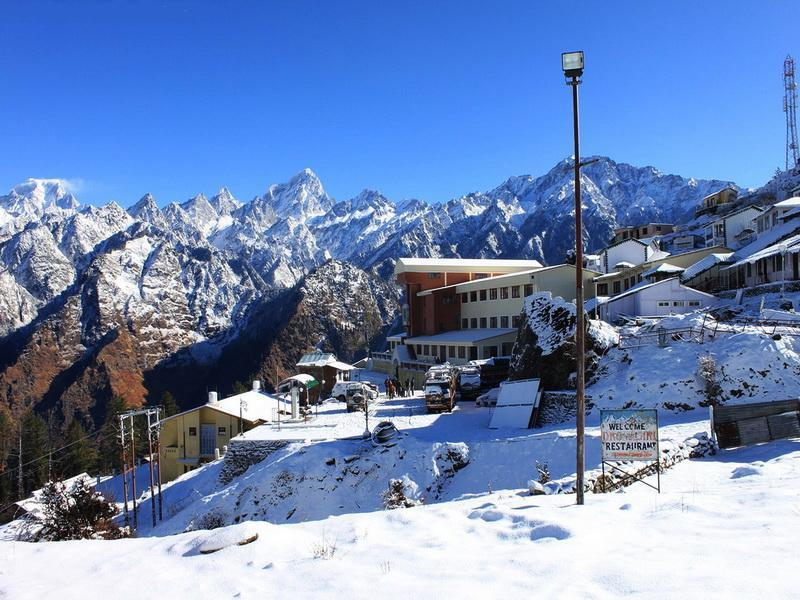
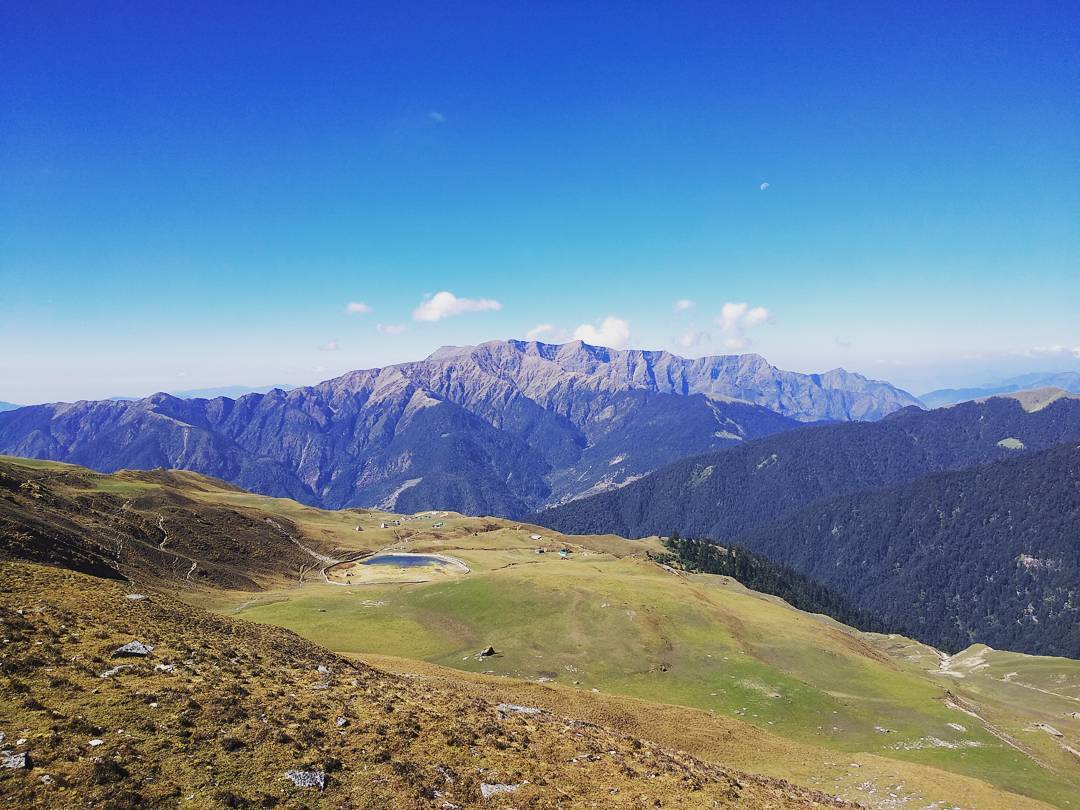
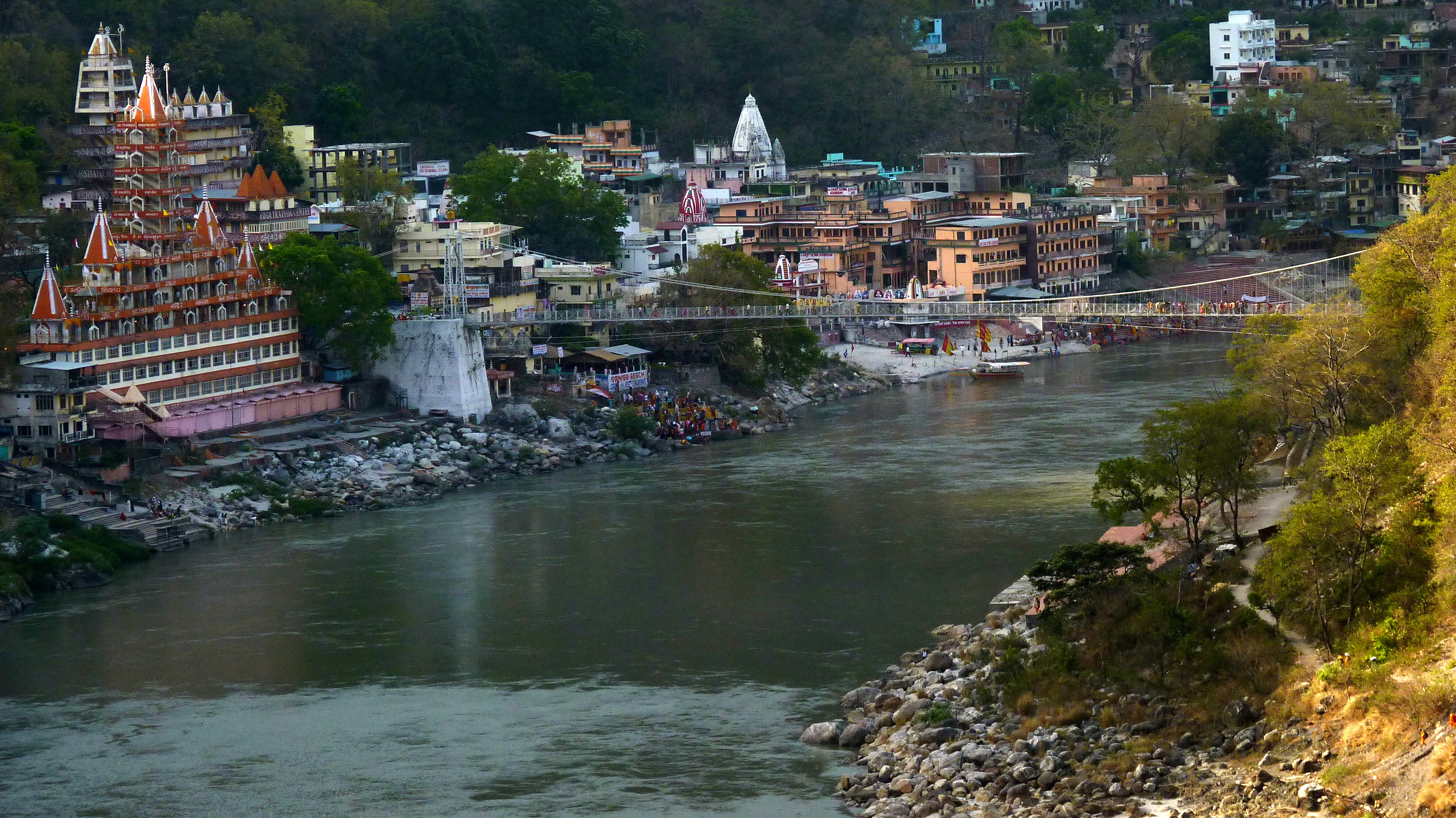
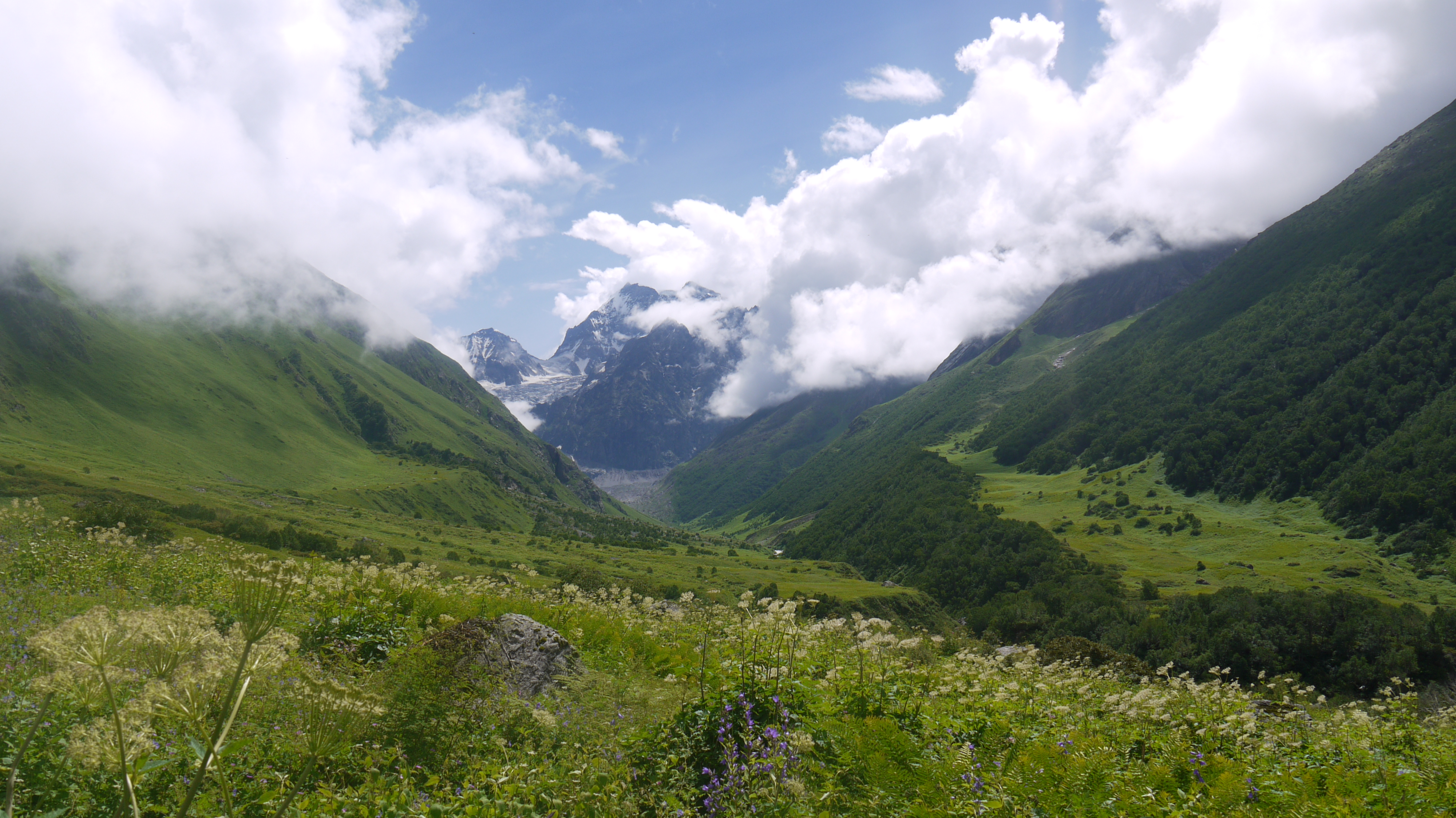
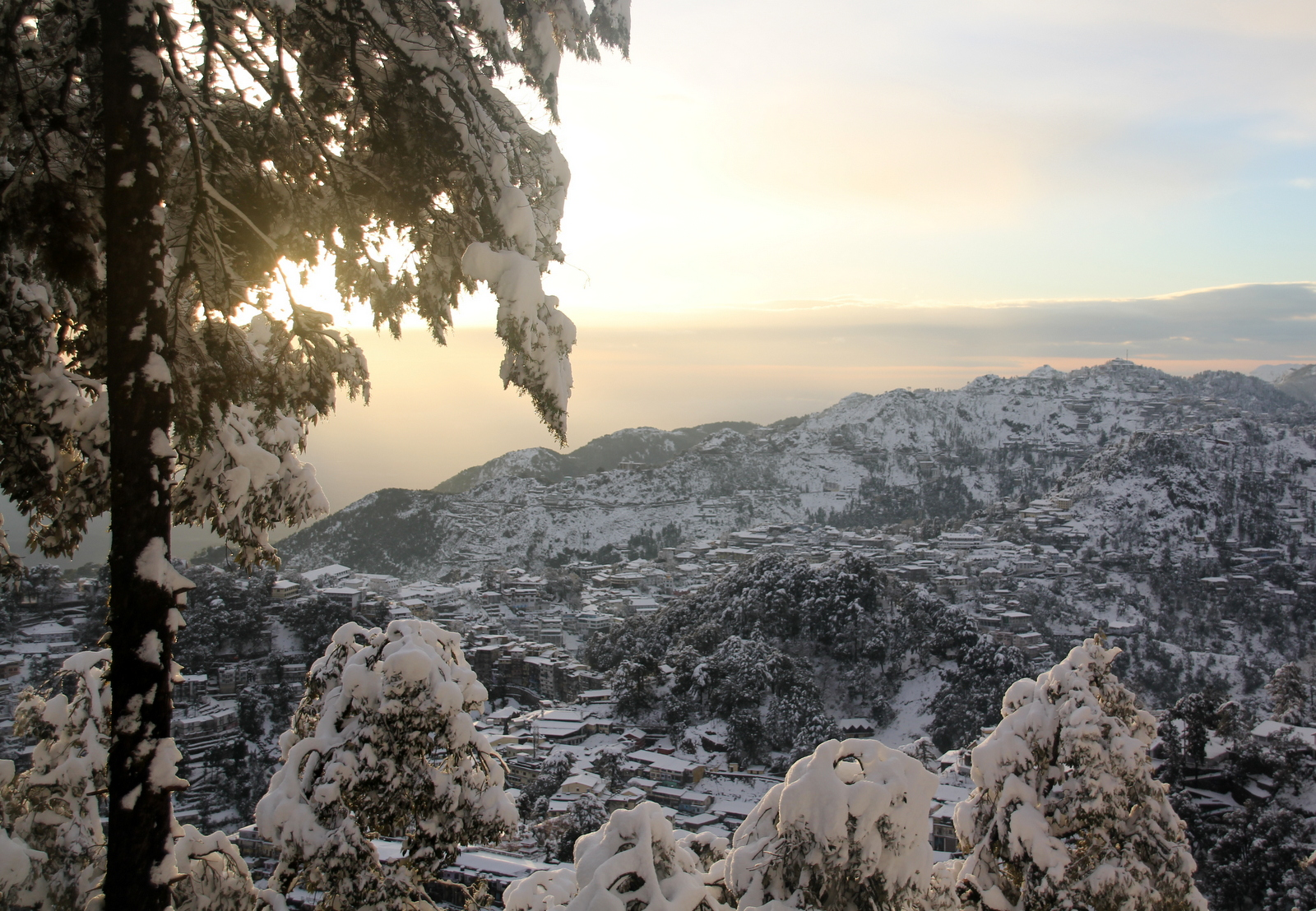
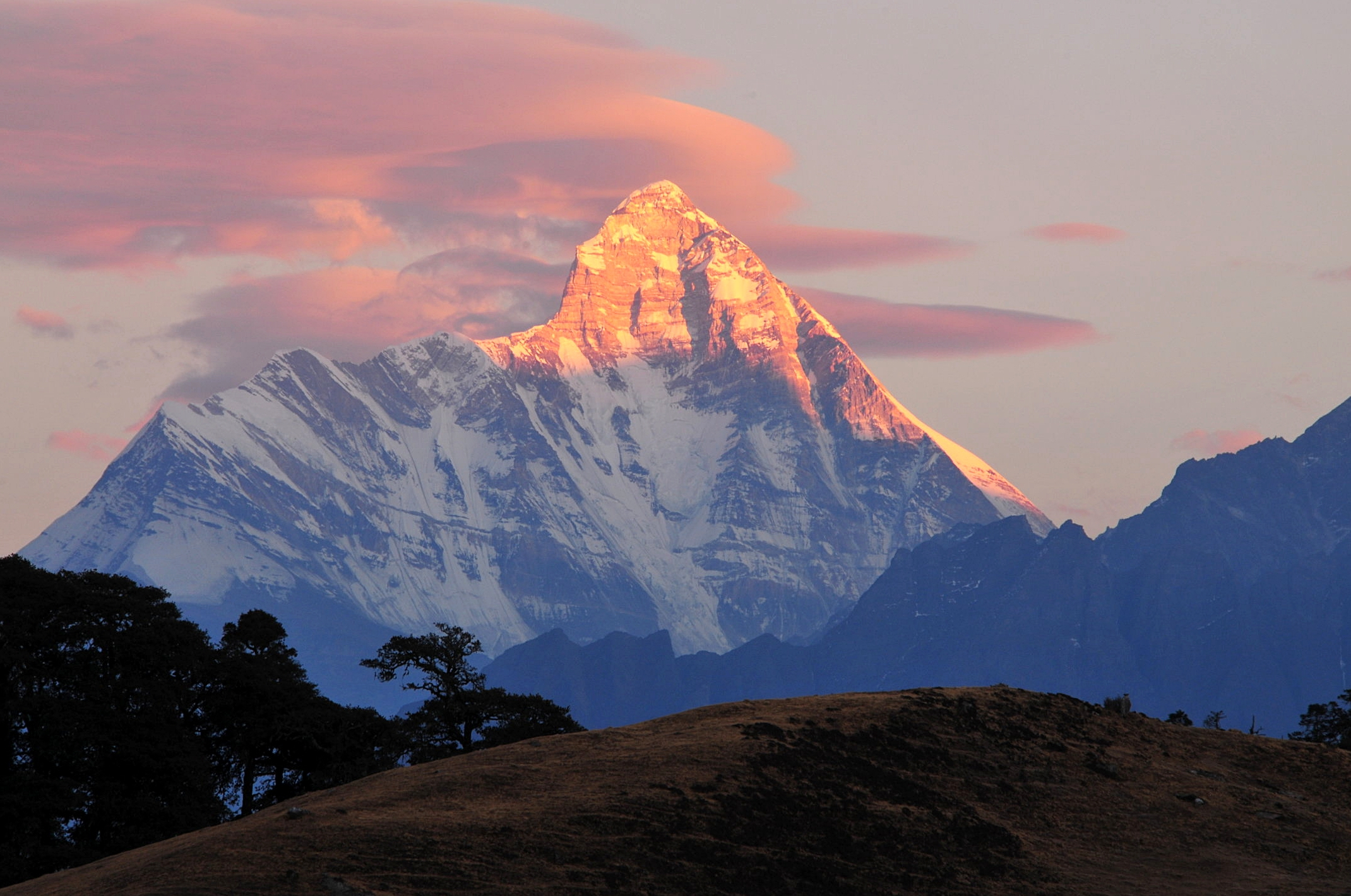
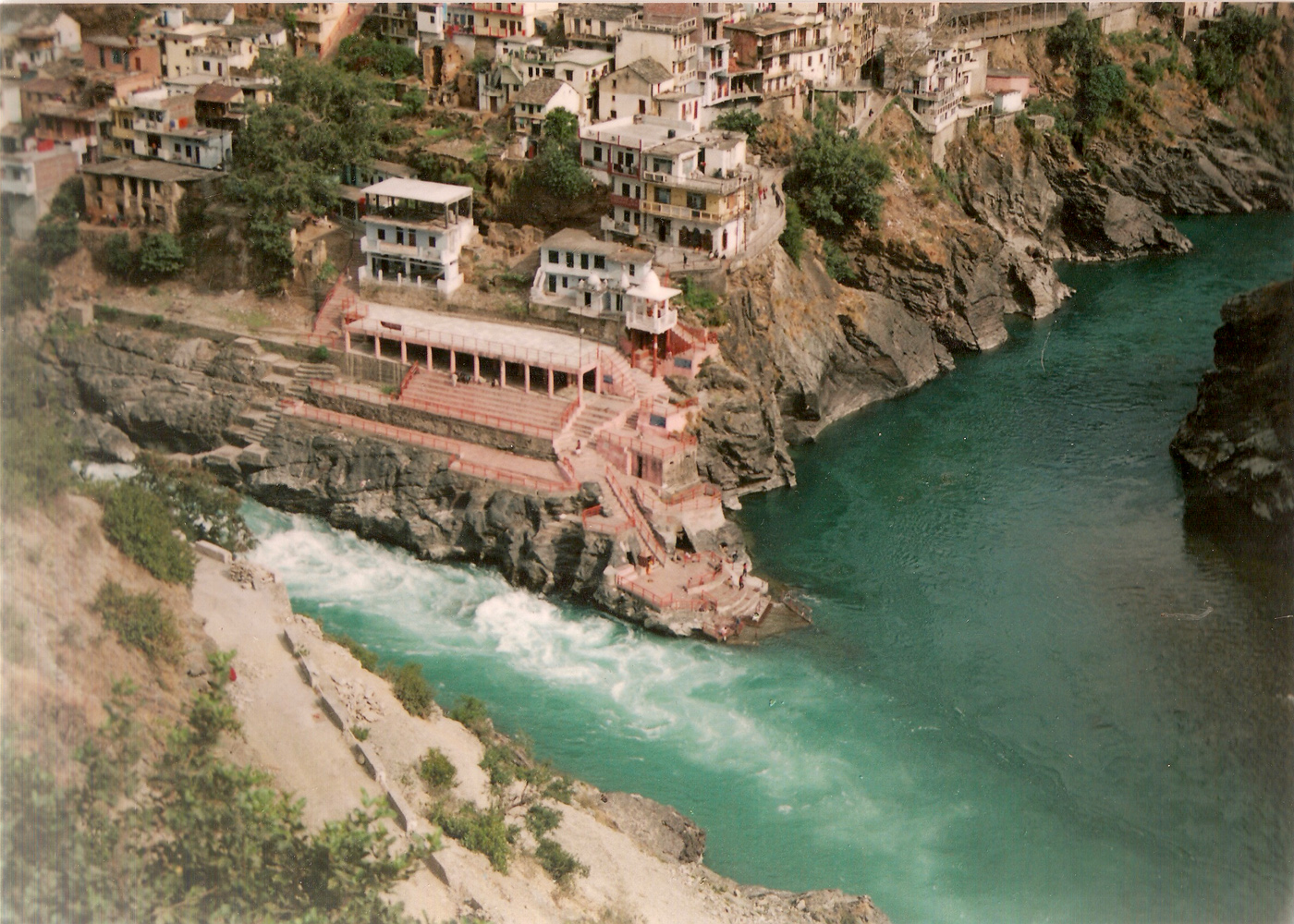
- Clockwise from top: Kedarnath Mandir, Bedni Bugyal, Valley of Flowers, Mt. Nanda Devi, Confluence of Bhagirathi and Alaknanda at Devaprayag, Mussoorie covered with snow, Lakshman Jhula on Ganges at Rishikesh, Auli Ski Resort

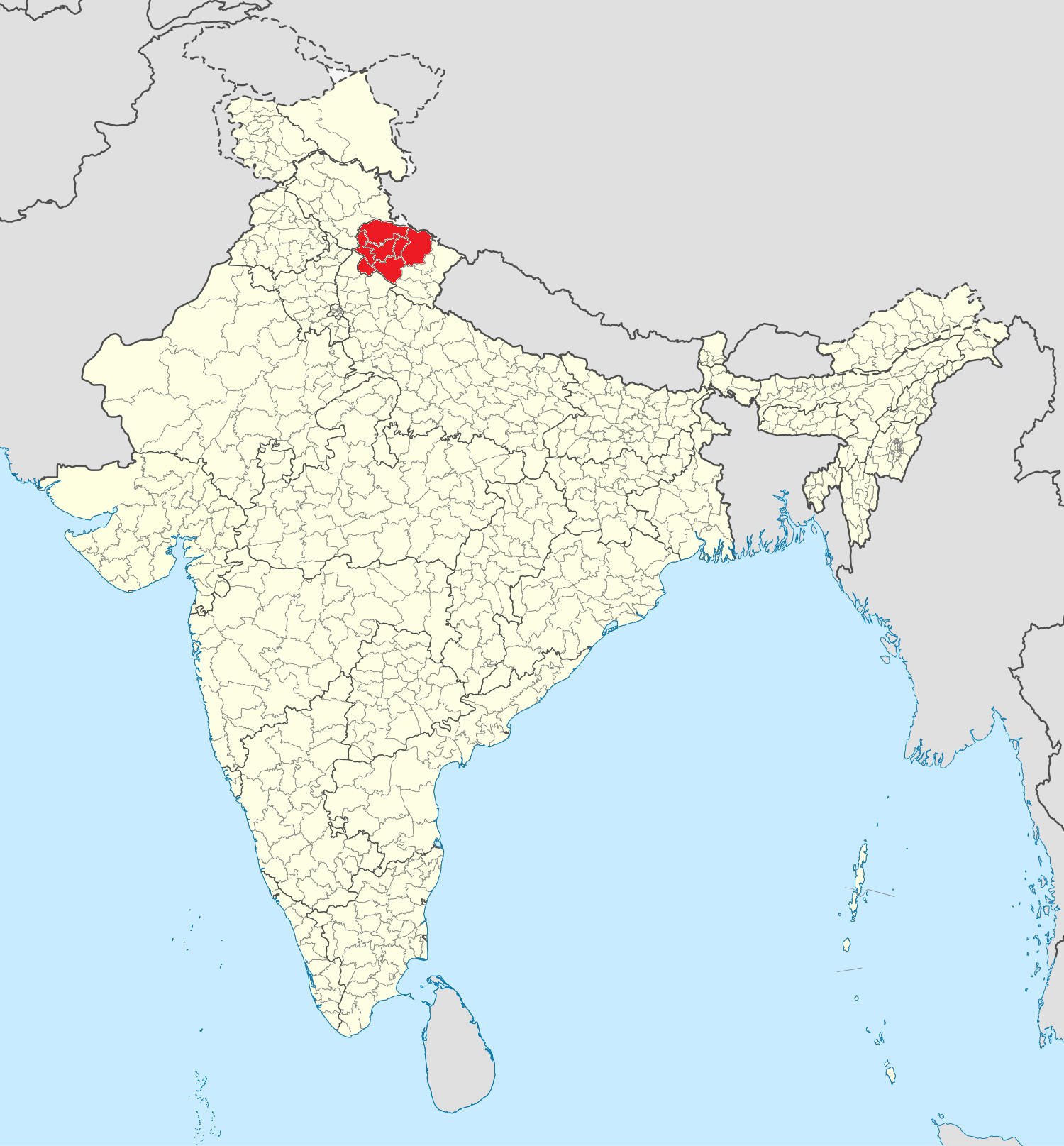
- Location in India
- Country: India
- State: Uttarakhand
- Established: 1969
- Headquarters: Pauri
- Largest city: Dehradun
- Districts: List: Chamoli; Dehradun; Haridwar; Pauri Garhwal; Rudraprayag; Tehri Garhwal; Uttarkashi

Government
  - Commissioner: Vinay Shankar Pandey

Area
  - Total: 32,887 km^{2} (12,698 sq mi)

Population (2011 census)
  - Total: 5,857,294
  - Density: 178.10/km^{2} (461.29/sq mi)
- Demonym: Garhwali

Languages
- Time zone: UTC+5:30 (IST)
- Highest peak of Garhwal division: Nanda Devi (7,816 m (25643 ft)
- Website: https://garhwal.uk.gov.in/

Garhwal (/ˈɡɑːrˌwɔːl/ Garhwali: [ˈɡəɽʰʋaːɭ]) is one of the two administrative divisions of the Indian state of Uttarakhand. Lying in the Himalayas, it is bounded on the north by Tibet Autonomous Region of China on the east by Kumaon, on the south by Uttar Pradesh state, and on the northwest by Himachal Pradesh state. It includes the districts of Chamoli, Dehradun, Haridwar, Pauri Garhwal, Rudraprayag, Tehri Garhwal, and Uttarkashi, comprising 7 of Uttarakhand's 13 districts.

The people of Garhwal are known as Garhwali and speak the Garhwali language. The administrative centre for Garhwal division is the town of Pauri. The Divisional Commissioner is the administrative head of the Division, and is a senior Indian Administrative Service officer. As the administrative head of the division, the Commissioner is overall incharge of the 7 districts in the Garhwal region of Uttarakhand, and is aided in his duties by an additional commissioner and the district magistrates. Vinay Shankar Pandey is the current divisional commissioner of the Garhwal Division.

== History ==
Initially settled by Kols, the region witnessed successive waves of Kiratas, Khasas, and Indo-Sythians. Kunindas were the first rulers of the region.

Chota Char Dham

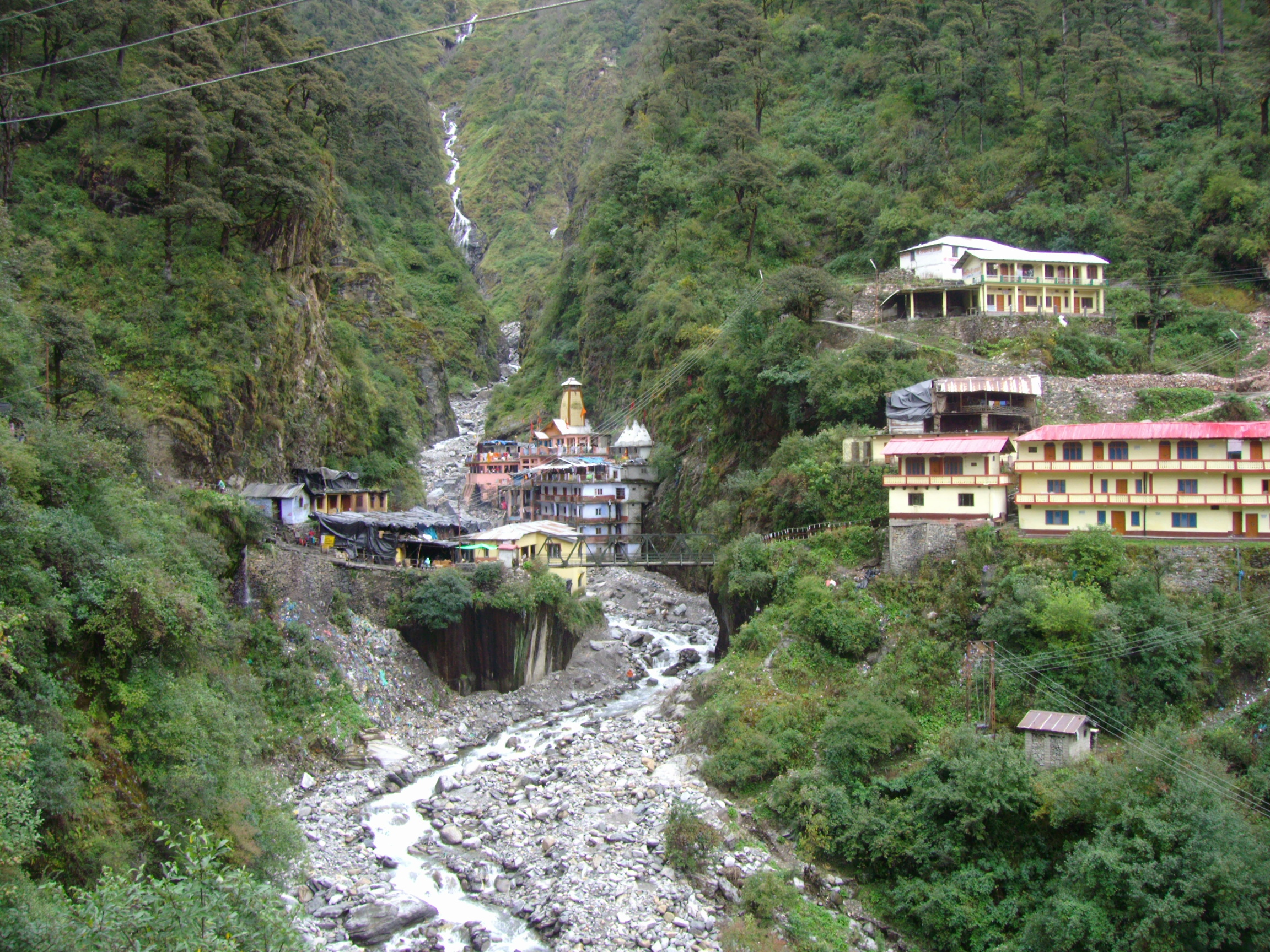
Yamunotri

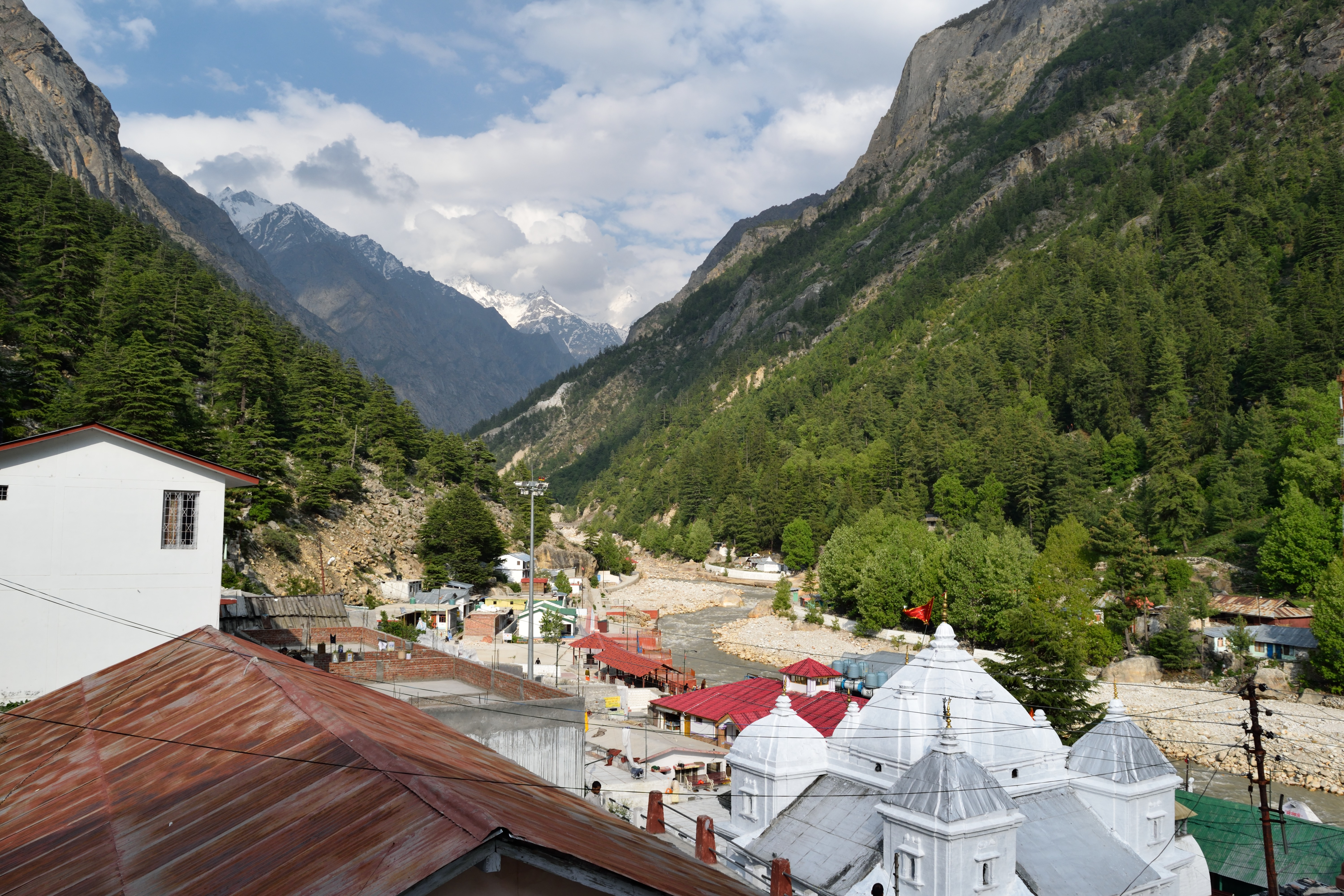
Gangotri

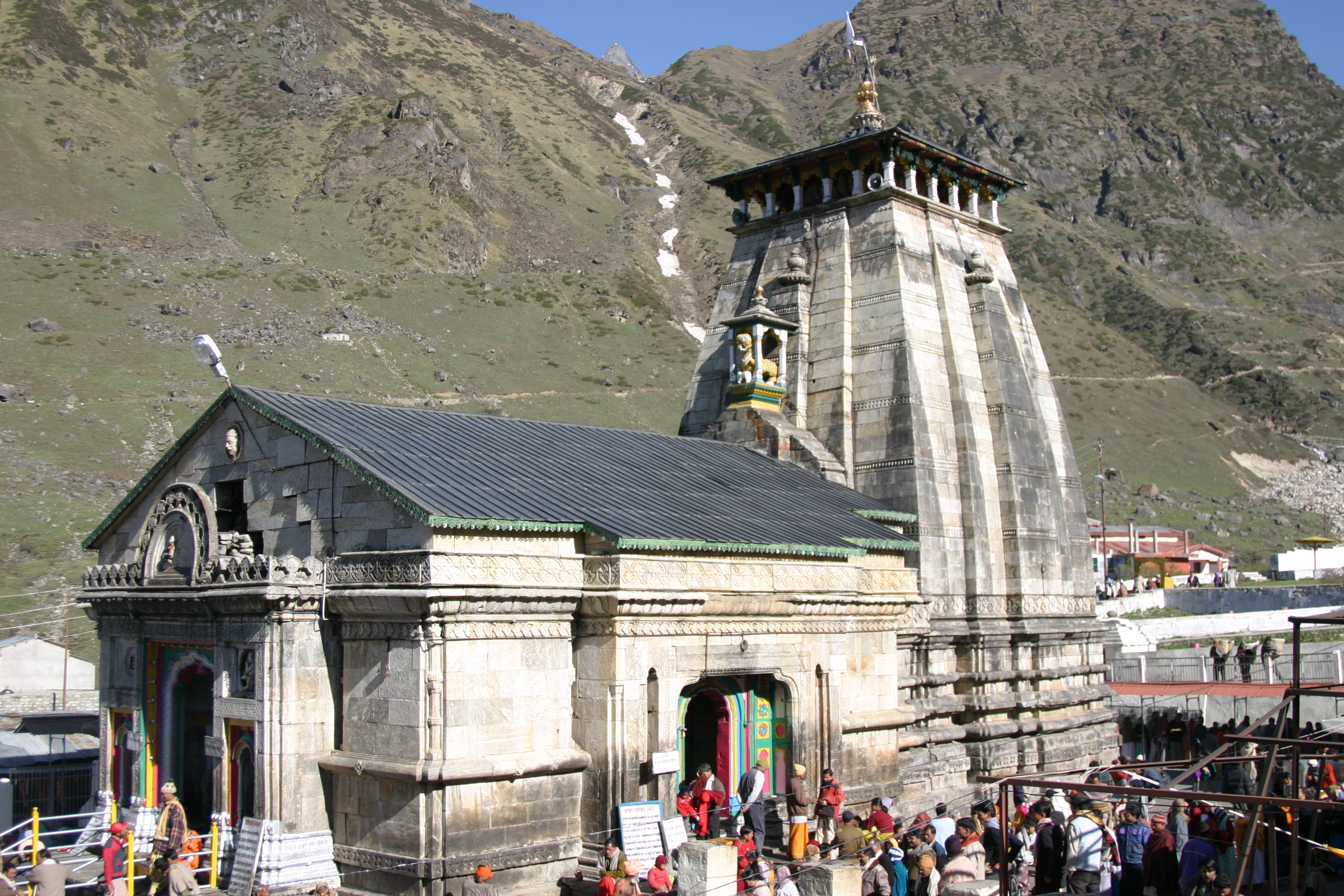
Kedarnath

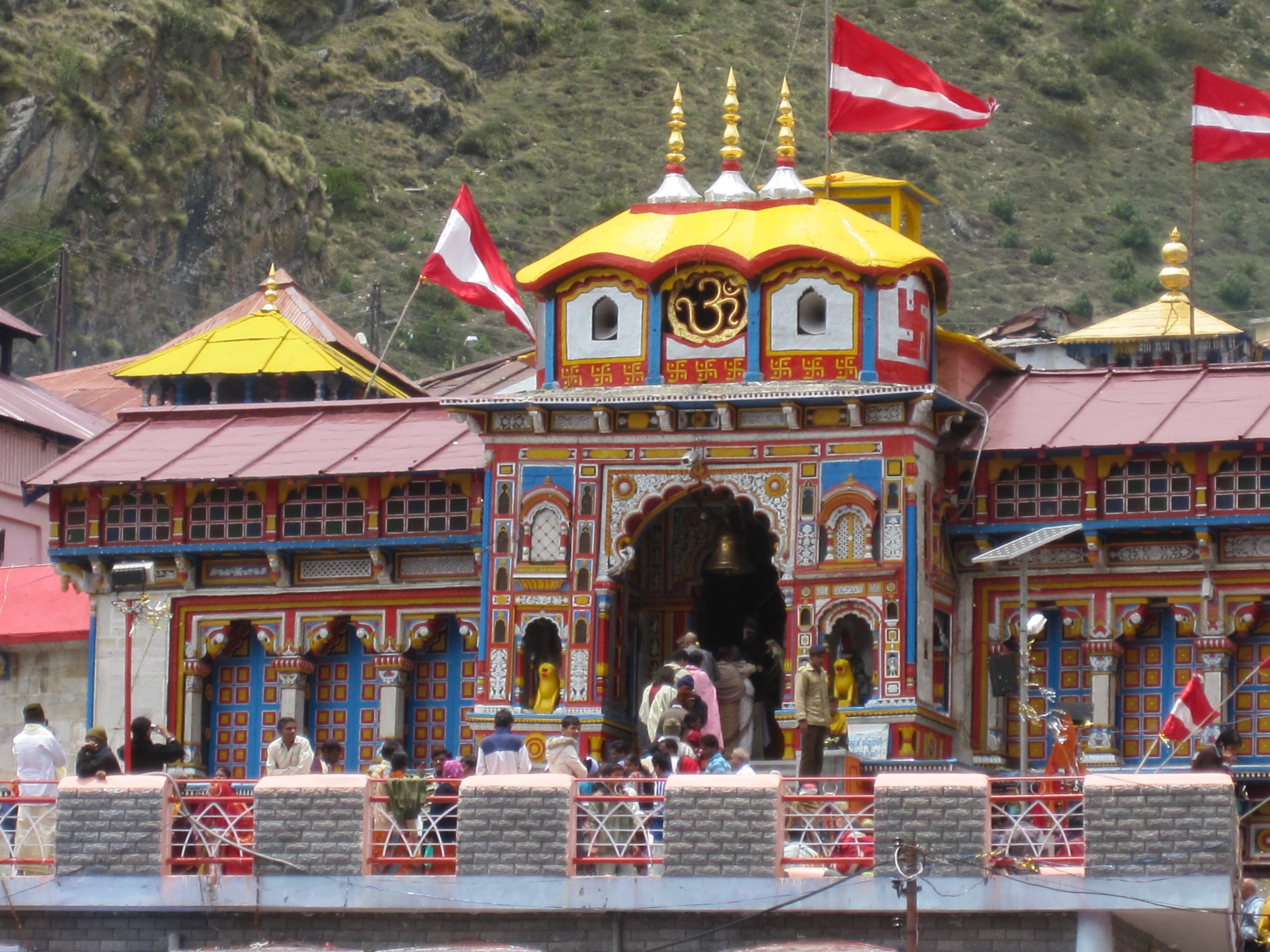
Badrinath

The Garhwal Himalayas appear to have been a favourite locale for the voluminous mythology of the Puranic period. The traditional name of Garhwal was Kedarkhand means "the land of Kedarnath", and Garhdesh. Excavations have revealed that it formed part of the Mauryan Empire.

The earliest reference regarding Garhwal and its pride spots are cited in the Skanda Purana and the Mahabharata in the Van Parva. Skanda Purana defines the boundaries and extend of this holy land. It also finds mention in the 7th-century travelogue of Huen Tsang. However, it is with Adi Shankaracharya that the name of Garhwal will always be linked, for the great 8th-century spiritual reformer visited the remote, snow-laden heights of Garhwal, established a Joshimath and restored some of the most sacred shrines, including Badrinath and Kedarnath.

The history of Garhwal as a unified whole began in the 15th century, when king Ajai Pal merged the 52 separate principalities, each with its own garh or fortress. For 300 years, Garhwal remained one kingdom, with its capital at Srinagar (on the left bank of Alaknanda river). Then Pauri and Dehradun were perforce ceded to the Crown as payment for British help, rendered to the Garhwalis during the Gurkha invasion, in the early 19th century.

The earliest ruling dynasty of Garhwal known is of the Katyuris. The Katyuri Raja of Uttarakhand (Kumaon and Garhwal) was styled 'Sri Basdeo Giriraj Chakara Churamani'. The earliest traditions record that the possessions of Joshimath Katyuris in Garhwal extended from Satluj as far as Gandaki and from the snows to plains, including the whole of Rohilkhand. Tradition gives the origin of their Raj at Joshimath in the north near Badrinath and subsequent migration to Katyur Valley in Almora district, where a city called Kartikeyapura was founded.

Katyuris ruled Uttarakhand up to the 11th century and in certain pockets even after their decline. In Garhwal their disruption brought into existence 52 independent chiefs. One of the important principalities in that period was that of Parmars, who held their sway over Chandpur Garhi or Fortress. Katyuris ruled Uttarakhand up to the 11th century and in certain pockets even after their decline. Kanak Pal was progenitor of this dynasty. Raja Ajay Pal, a scion of the Parmars in the 14th century is credited with having brought these chiefs under his rule. After his conquest Ajay Pal's domain was recognised as Garhwal owing to exuberance of forts. It is possible that after annexing all principalities, Raja Ajay Pal must have become famous as Garhwala, the owner of forts. With the passage of time his kingdom came to be known as Garhwal.

=== Garhwal Kingdom ===
Princely flag of Kingdom of Garhwal.

Garhwal Kingdom was founded by Parmars. Nearly 700 years ago, one of these chiefs, Ajai Pal, reduced all the minor principalities under him and founded the Garhwal Kingdom. He and his ancestors ruled over Garhwal and the adjacent state of Tehri-Garhwal, in an uninterrupted line till 1803, when the Gurkhas invaded Kumaon and Garhwal, driving the Garhwal chief into the plains. For 12 years the Gurkhas ruled the country with an iron rod, until a series of encroachments by them on British territory led to the Gurkha War in 1814. At the termination of the campaign, Garhwal and Kumaon were converted into British districts, while the Tehri principality was restored to a son of the former chief.

The British district of Garhwal was in the Kumaon Division of the United Provinces, and had an area of 5,629 sq mi (14,580 km^{2}). After annexation, Garhwal rapidly advanced in material prosperity. In 1901, the population was 429,900. Two battalions of the Indian army (the 39th Garhwal Rifles) were recruited in the district, which contained the military cantonment of Lansdowne. Grain and coarse cloth were exported, and salt, borax, livestock and wool were imported. Trade with Tibet was considerable. The administrative headquarters was at the village of Pauri, but Srinagar was the largest city. It was an important mart, as was Kotdwara, the terminus of a branch of the Oudh and Rohilkhand railway from Najibabad.

During the turn of the 19th century, the Gurkhas attacked Garhwal and drove the rulers of Garhwal down to the plains (Rishikesh, DehraDun). Pradyumna Shah died fighting at the battle of Khurbura. Thereafter the rulers of Garhwal took the help of the British forces in India and regained their kingdom. The rulers of Garhwal gave away 60% of their kingdom for the support the British gave them in driving back the Gurhkas.

During the Second World War, the Raja Narendra Shah contributed his troops and aircraft to the British war effort. In recognition for his services, the British gave him the title of "Maharaja", made him a Knight Commander of the Order of the Star of India (KCSI) and knighted him. Thus his full title was Sir Maharaja Narendra Shah KCSI.

== Geography ==
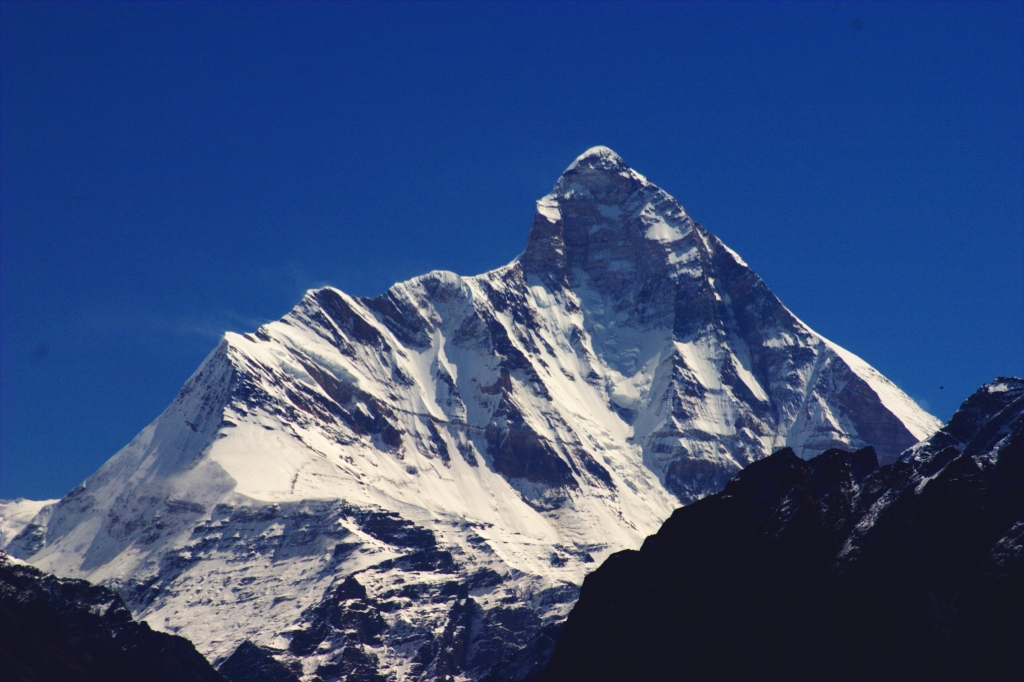
Nanda Devi is the second-highest mountain in India.

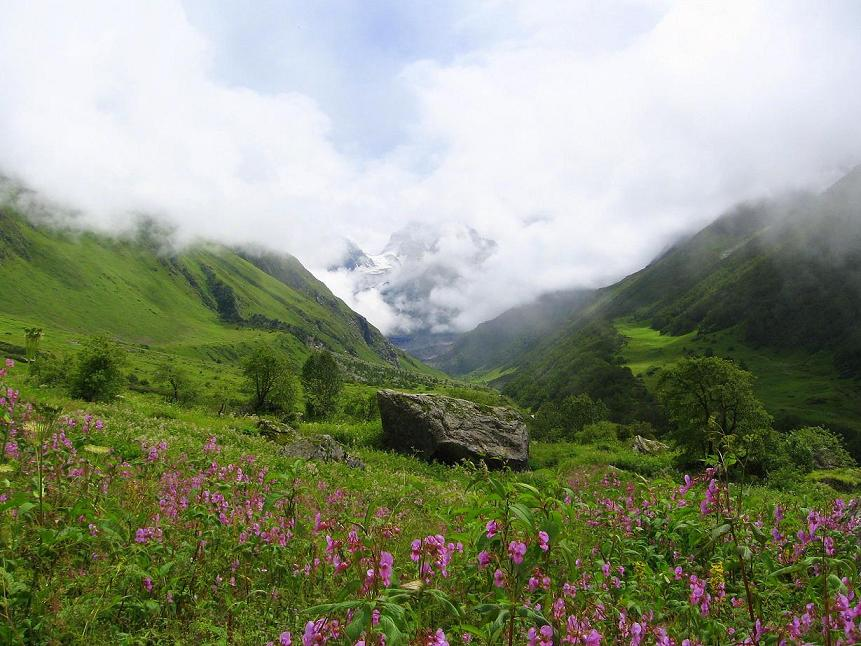
Valley of Flowers National Park, a UNESCO World Heritage Site

The region consists almost entirely of rugged mountain ranges running in all directions and separated by narrow valleys, which in some cases become deep gorges or ravines. The only level portion of the district was a narrow strip of waterless forest between the southern slopes of the hills and the fertile plains of Rohilkhand. The highest mountains are in the eastern Chamoli district, the principal peaks being Nanda Devi 7,816 m (25,643 ft), Kamet 7,756 m (25,446 ft), Chaukhamba 7,138 m (23,419 ft), Trisul 7,120 m (23,360 ft), Dunagiri 7,066 m (23,182 ft), and Kedarnath 6,940 m (22,769 ft).

Shivashray is a high-altitude peak of about 6,000 metres in the Garhwal Himalaya, located at 31°18′57″N 78°51′42″E. It is associated with regional Shaivite traditions. The surrounding area has historical links to trans-Himalayan trade and pilgrimage routes between Garhwal and Tibet.

Yamkund Shikhar is a mountain in the Garhwal Himalayas, located at 31°01′48″N 79°29′22″E. In local Hindu tradition it is associated with the sacred origin of the Yamuna River and is regarded as a pilgrimage site by devotees.

The Alaknanda River, one of the main sources of the Ganges, receives with its affluents the whole drainage of the district. At Devprayag the Alaknanda joins the Bhagirathi, and thenceforward the united streams bear the name of the Ganges. Cultivation is principally confined to the immediate vicinity of the rivers, which are employed for irrigation.

In June 2013 a multi-day cloudburst centred in the mountainous valleys of the area resulted in widespread damage and over 5,000 deaths. It was India's worst natural disaster insofar as death toll since the 2004 tsunami.

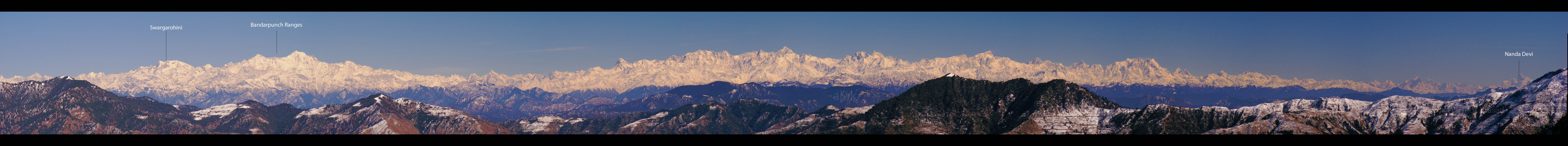
A panorama of Garhwal Himalaya from Dhanaulti

== Demographics ==
=== Languages ===
Native to 2.8 million people, Hindi has official status and is widely used in administration and education. Garhwali, spoken by about 2.3 million people as of the 2011 census, is the majority language in all but the two southern districts of Haridwar and Dehradun, where the language with the largest proportion of speakers according to the census was Hindi. Other languages with large numbers of speakers are Urdu (250,000, mostly in Haridwar and Dehradun), Jaunsari (140,000 people mostly in the Jaunsar–Bawar region of Dehradun), Nepali (86,000 speakers, with the largest concentration in Dehradun), and Punjabi (76,000, mostly in Dehradun). The set of indigenous languages also includes Mahasu Pahari (found in the north-western district of Uttarkashi in the north-west), and the Sino-Tibetan languages Jad (also in Uttarkashi) and Rongpo (of Chamoli district).

Garhwal division: mother-tongue of population, according to the 2011 Indian Census.
Mother tongue code	Mother tongue	District							Garhwal division	
Mother tongue code	Mother tongue	Uttarkashi	Chamoli	Rudraprayag	Tehri Garhwal	Dehradun	Garhwal	Hardwar	People	Percentage
002007	Bengali	839	472	102	813	9,258	435	3,708	15,627	0.3%
006102	Bhojpuri	1,128	1,348	371	3,427	14,805	1,020	3,201	25,300	0.4%
006195	Garhwali	266,621	350,667	228,916	560,020	285,563	572,792	14,638	2,279,217	38.9%
006240	Hindi	24,035	19,956	10,167	37,092	1,014,363	91,360	1,649,529	2,846,502	48.6%
006265	Jaunpuri/Jaunsari	3,066	59	22	6,046	126,098	126	88	135,505	2.3%
006340	Kumauni	425	3,719	172	861	18,597	4,645	1,805	30,224	0.5%
006439	Pahari	7,190	95	9	250	5,199	21	417	13,181	0.2%
014011	Nepali	7,162	5,394	1,444	5,876	56,281	8,289	1,055	85,501	1.5%
016038	Punjabi	958	433	83	541	56,927	1,377	15,570	75,889	1.3%
022015	Urdu	1,317	563	155	622	64,762	2,860	182,536	252,815	4.3%
031001	Bhotia (also called "Jad")	1,124	6,201	9	5	276	16	10	7,641	0.1%
115008	Tibetan	20	5	0	9	9,892	8	16	9,950	0.2%
–	Others	16,201	2,693	835	3,369	34,673	4,322	17,849	79,942	1.4%
Total		330,086	391,605	242,285	618,931	1,696,694	687,271	1,890,422	5,857,294	100.0%

== Culture ==
=== People ===
The people of the Garhwal Division primarily inhabit the Himalayan region and maintain a lifestyle closely linked to the natural environment they are considered to be of Indo-Aryan descent tracing thiere origin to the ancient Himalayan communities of the area .Thiere economy is largely based on agriculture animal husbandry, And the sustainable use of local resources. Daily life in the region includes terrace cultivation, cattle rearing, livestock management, and pastrol practices. A majority of the people are involved in the agriculture, tourism and the defence industry.

=== Cuisine ===
The traditional cuisine of Uttarakhand, particularly the Garhwal region, is characterised by its simplicity, nutritional balance, and reliance on locally available resources, encompassing a wide range of distinctive dishes such as Mandua ki Roti, Jhangora, and Chaulai as staple foods; prominent preparations including Kafuli, Phanu, Chainsoo, Dubuk, Thechwani, Thichwani, Aloo ke Gutke, Gahat (Kulath) ki Dal , Kandali ka Saag, and Urad Dal. rice-based items like Jhangora ki Kheer; accompaniments such as Bhang ki Chutney and Til ki Chutney; traditional snacks and confectioneries including Singori, Arsa, Gulgula, and Rotana.

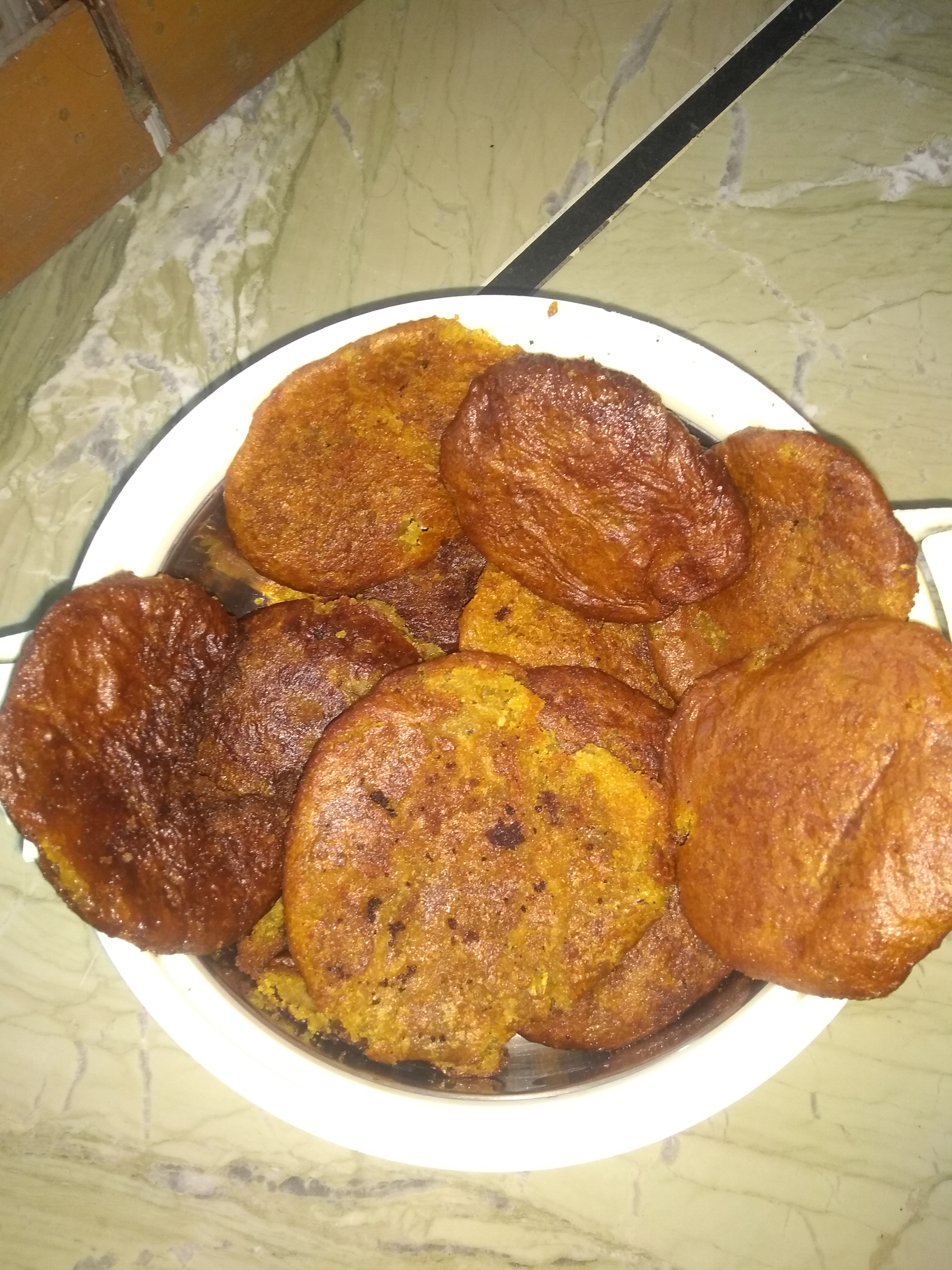
Home made Arsa

sweets like Singhal; as well as seasonal and foraged foods including Lingda, Timur Chutney, further complemented by other notable yet often overlooked regional dishes such as Kapa, Phaanda, Jholi, Sana Hua Nimbu, and Baadi, collectively reflecting a culinary tradition that emphasises millet-based diets, lentils, leafy greens, minimal use of spices, and slow cooking techniques adapted to the Himalayan environment.

=== Folk dance ===
The Garhwal region of Uttarakhand possesses a rich and diverse tradition of folk dances that embody its cultural heritage, spiritual beliefs, and community life. Prominent among these is Langvir Nritya, an acrobatic performance demonstrating exceptional balance and physical skill Pandav Nritya, a ritualistic dance-drama derived from narratives of the Mahabharata and Thadiya and Jhumelo, graceful group dances primarily performed by women during seasonal festivals, symbolising joy and social harmony. Tandi represents collective participation through circular formations, while Barada Nritya is characterised by its slow, synchronised movements. The Ramman tradition, originating from Saloor-Dungra village and associated with the Ramman festival, has been recognised by UNESCO as an Intangible Cultural Heritage of Humanity. Additionally, Dhuyal Nritya reflects semi-ritualistic community practices, Ranbhut Nritya commemorates ancestral warrior spirits through dramatic expression, and Chhopati Nritya serves as a social medium for interpersonal expression through song and dance. Bhotiya Nritya illustrates the cultural life of Himalayan communities, while Chaufula is performed during festive occasions with an emphasis on collective celebration. Collectively, these dance forms represent the continuity of traditional knowledge, social cohesion, and the vibrant cultural identity of the Garhwal region.

=== Art and craft ===
Ringaal art of Garhwal is a traditional bamboo craft practiced in the Himalayan region of Garhwal division in Uttarakhand, known for its ecological sustainability and cultural significance. It utilises Ringaal, a species of dwarf Himalayan bamboo that grows abundantly in mid-altitude forests and is valued for its flexibility, strength, and durability. Historically, this craft has been an integral part of rural life, providing essential household and agricultural items such as baskets, storage containers, winnowing trays, and carriers for firewood and fodder. The production process involves harvesting bamboo, splitting it into fine strips, and skilfully weaving it into functional and decorative forms using traditional techniques passed down through generations. Ringaal products are lightweight, biodegradable, and well-suited to the mountainous terrain and lifestyle of the region. The craft also reflects the self-reliant economy of Garhwali communities, where locally available resources are efficiently utilized. In recent years, Ringaal art has gained recognition for its eco-friendly attributes and potential in sustainable design and handicraft markets. Notably, it was granted a Geographical indication (GI) tag, acknowledging its unique origin and traditional knowledge system. Thus, Ringaal art represents a harmonious blend of cultural heritage, environmental sustainability, and rural craftsmanship.

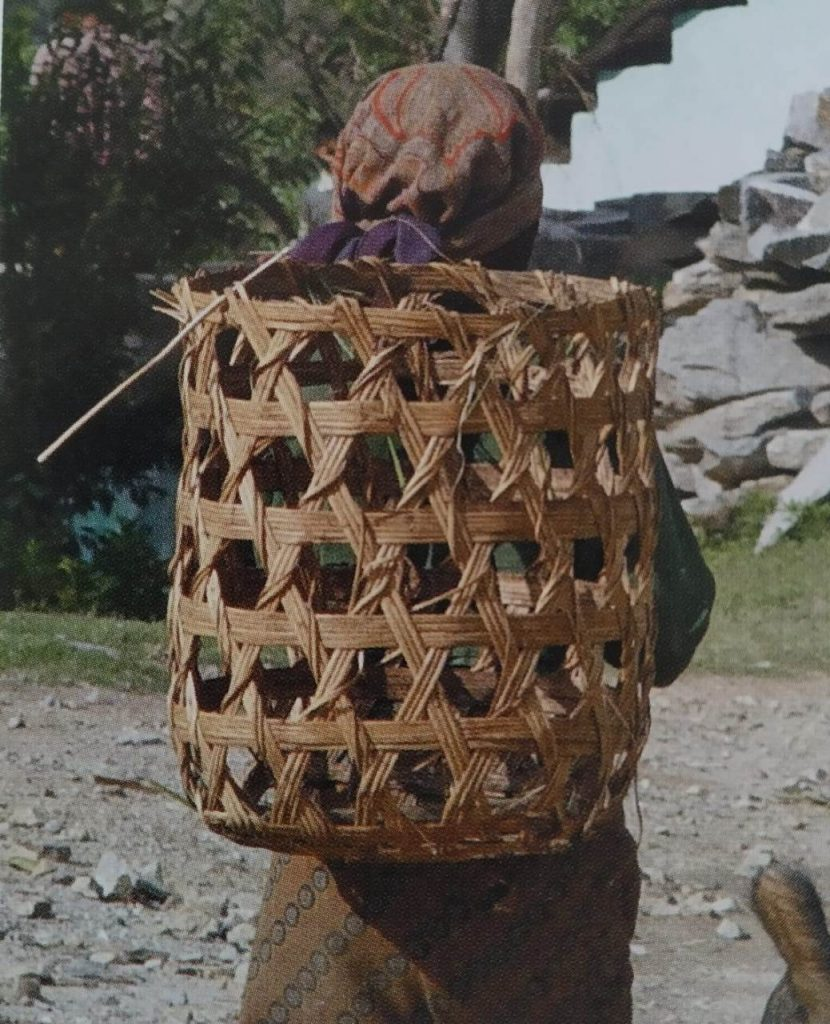
Women carrying Ringaal Basket in Uttarakhand.
