= Kalimath =

- Village
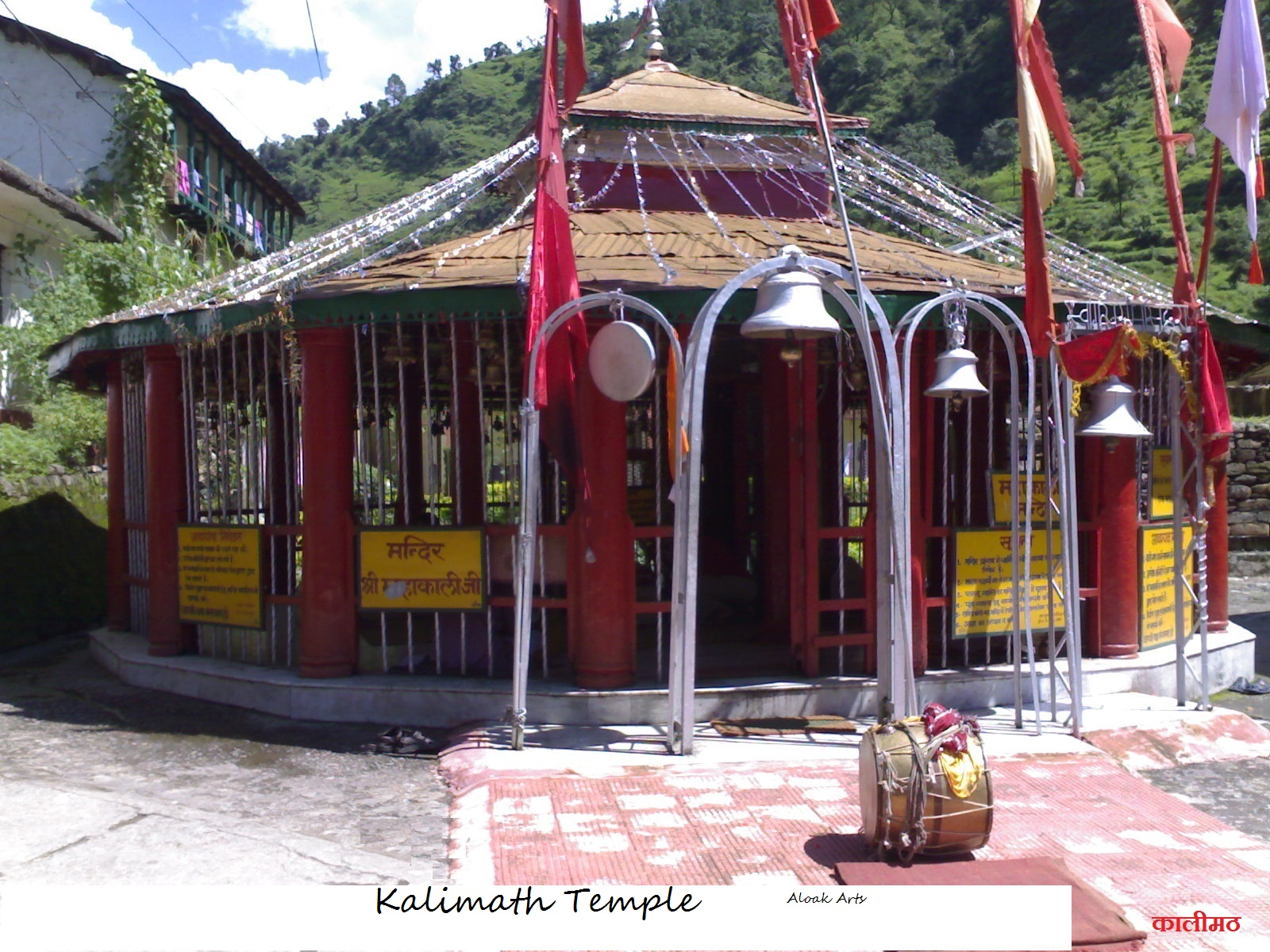

- Location within Uttarakhand Location within India
- Coordinates: 30.563887°N 79.085083°E
- Country: India
- State: Uttarakhand
- District: Rudraprayag

Population (2011)
  - Total: 545

Languages
  - Official: Hindi
- Time zone: UTC+5:30 (IST)
- PIN: 246439
- Vehicle registration: UK13
- Nearest city: Guptakashi
- Sex ratio: 982/1000 ♀/♂ (2011)
- Literacy: 81.08% (2011)
- Website: uk.gov.in

Kalimath is a Hindu Temple, dedicated to Maa Kali, the fierce and powerful form of Maa Durga. This temple is located in Kalimath village in the Rudraprayag district of Uttarakhand. The temple is home to the lower half of the deity, while the upper half is located in the Dhari Devi temple.

== Geography ==
It lies at an altitude of around 6,000 feet (1,800 m) on the left side of Mandakini river and on the bank of Kaliganga (locally known as Saraswati river) in the Himalayas, surrounded by the peaks of Kedarnath. Kalimath is situated close to Ukhimath and Guptakashi.

== Religion ==
The temple of the Hindu goddess Kali there is visited by devotees year round, especially during the Navratras. It is one of 108 Shakta pithas in India as per Srimad Devi Bhagwat.

The Sri Yantra is the object of devotion. The idol of Kali is only taken out and worshipped in the temple one day each year when Puja is performed at midnight, with only the chief priest present. Near the temple are other ancient temples to Laxmi, Saraswati, Gauri Shankar and many antique Shivlings, idols of Nandi and Ganesh, etc.

An eternal flame always burns in the temple of Laxmi. Bhairava Mandir is located nearby.

Satpal Maharaj set up a small Dharamshala near the temple where pilgrims can stay. About 2 km east is Kunjethi village, hosting two temples of Mata Manana Devi and Mankameshwar Mahadev. 6 km from Kalimath at the top of a hill there is a huge Kalishila and another Kali Temple.

== Mythology ==
According to Hindu mythology, Raktabija was a powerful demon who had received a boon from Lord Brahma that allowed him to regenerate from every drop of blood that fell from his body. This made him nearly invincible in battle, as each wound created new demons of equal strength.

To defeat Raktabija, Maa Kali adopted a unique strategy — she drank every drop of the demon’s blood before it could touch the ground, preventing him from regenerating. After a fierce battle, Maa Kali ultimately destroyed Raktabija and restored cosmic balance.

This story is deeply connected to the origin of Kalimath Temple, as it is believed that after defeating Raktabija, Goddess Kali chose this sacred place to withdraw her immense energy into the earth. This is why, even today, the deity at Kalimath is worshipped in a sacred pit rather than in a visible idol form.

== Notables ==
The village is the birthplace of Kalidas, a Sanskrit poet.
