= Ramman (festival) =

Religious festival of Garhwal region, Uttarakhand, India

Ramman Festival
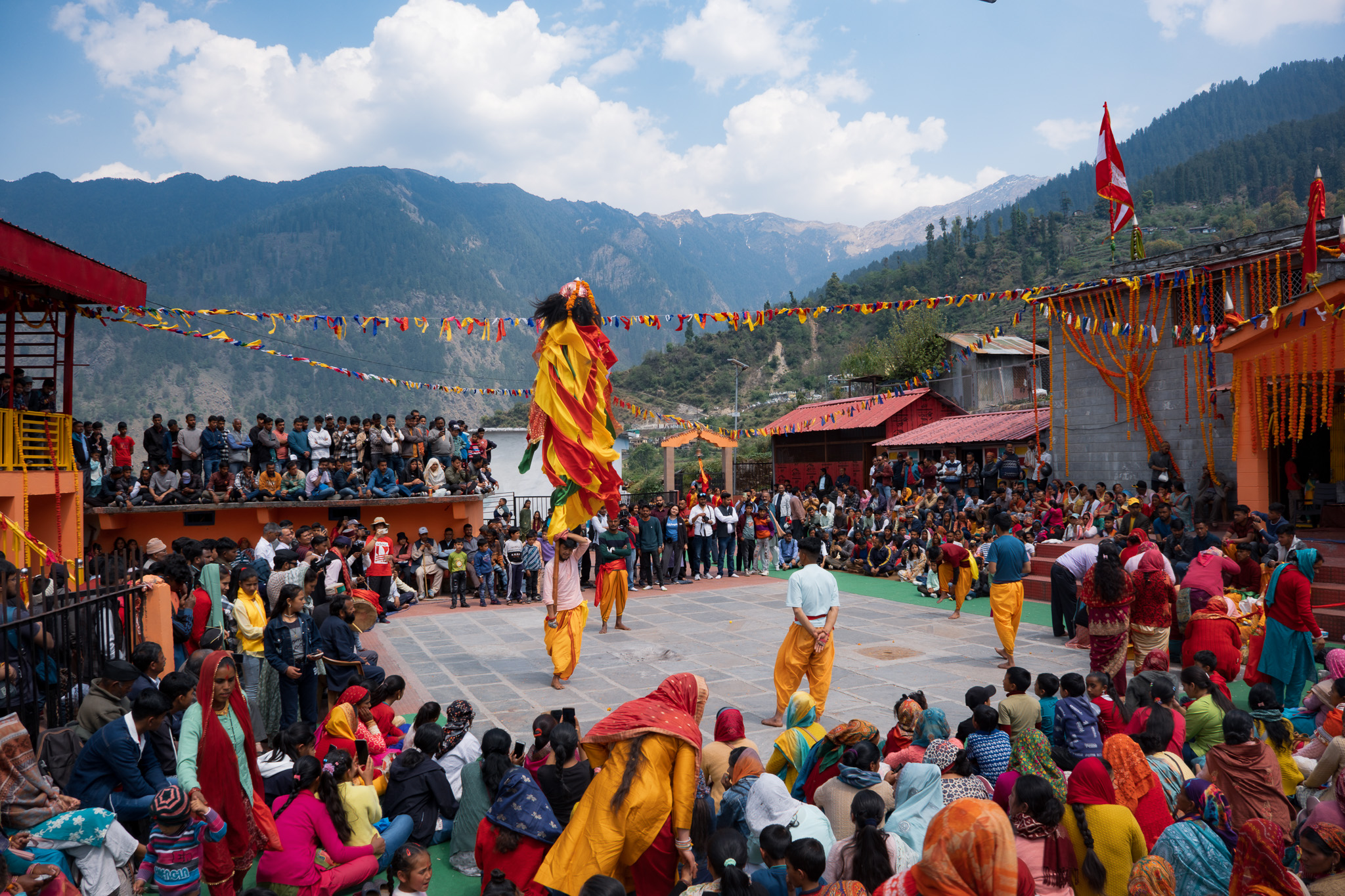
- Traditional performance during Ramman Festival
- Observed by: People of Saloor-Dungra village
- Type: Religious and cultural festival
- Significance: Ritual theatre honoring the village deity Bhumiyal Devta
- Celebrations: Masked dances, music, rituals, and storytelling
- Date: April (according to Hindu calendar)

Ramman is a religious festival and ritual theatre of the Garhwal region in India. It is a festival of the Garhwali People celebrated in many villages of the region. Although there are many Rammans, such as the Jak Ramman, one of the most popular is the masked Ramman of the Saloor Dungra village of the Painkhanda Valley in the Chamoli district in Uttarakhand, India.

The masked Ramman is unique to the Saloor-Dungra village and is neither replicated nor performed anywhere else in the Himalayan region. The festival and the eponymous art form are conducted as an offering to the village deity, Bhumiyal Devta, in the courtyard of the village temple.

== Deity ==
The guardian deity of Saloor Dungra is Bhumichetrapal, also known as Bhumiyal Devta. The festival is held in her honour every year after Baisakhi, a harvest festival that also marks the beginning of the Hindu Solar New Year. On the day of Baisakhi, the village priest announces the date for the Ramman festival which falls on the ninth or the eleventh day after Baisakhi. The Bhumiyal Devta comes out in a procession to the temple on the day of Baisakhi. The second day, people offer hariyali (sprouted barley plants), to the deity who, in turn, promises prosperity to all, including agricultural yield and forest produce. Every day of the festival, the Devta takes a round of the village. The festival lasts for ten days during which time the local epic of Rama is sung and masked dances depicting different aspects of life take place in the courtyard of the Bhumiyal Devta's temple It is said that the Ramman festival is celebrated here from a very old time for about 500 years, as well as the festival is celebrated jointly by the local panchayat for 11 to 13 days. Raman Festival Is organized here too, but It is said that this festival of Sallud and Dungra is more famous

== Festivities and dances ==
The Ramman begins with an invocation to Ganesha, the remover of obstacles followed by the dance of Ganesha and Parvati. This is followed by the dance of the Sun God, an enactment of the creation-myth of the birth of Brahma and Ganesha. The other dances include the dance of the Bur Deva along with Gopi Chand (Krishna) and Radhika, the Mwar-Mwarin dance that showcases the travails of the buffalo herders and the Baniya-Baniyain Nritya (dance of the trader-couple) that shows the hardships faced by the common people. After these initial performances, the focus now shifts to the enactment of the local Ramkatha. Episodes from Rama's life, beginning with his visit to Janakpur and culminating with his coronation following his return from exile, are sung to a total of 324 beats and steps. Another important aspect of these performances is the singing of Jagar, a musical rendition of local legends.

There are also other dances and episodes like the Maal Nritya, Koorjogi and Narsingh Pattar Nritya that follow the Ramkatha. In the Maal Nritya, a historical battle between the Gurkhas of Nepal and the local Garhwalis is comically enacted by a troupe of four dancers dressed in red and white. It is mandatory to have a red Maal from the Kunwar caste of Saloor village, as it is believed that this hamlet supported the Gorkhas while the other three are selected by the panches of the Gram Panchayat.

In the Koorjogi ceremony, weeds (koor) from the village fields are pulled out by a Koorjogi, a character who carries a sack full of these weeds. There is much merriment as people throw these weeds at each other in a spirit of a communal sport.

== Community participation ==
The villagers of Saloor-Dungra are the inheritors, organizers and financers of the Ramman festival. All households, irrespective of caste and community, offer prayers and perform rituals to the main deities of the Ramman. The roles of the various castes in the festival are however well established. Talented youth and elders selected by village heads are the performers at Ramman. The Brahmin priests conduct the rituals and prepare and serve prasada to the deity. Baaris are charged with the organization and collection of funds while the Dhaaris are a group that assists the baaris in organizing the event. The baaris and dhaaris are assigned their duties by the Gram panchas. It is also these panchas who select the residence of the Bhumiyal Devta till the next Ramman festival. The family where Bhumiyal Devta resides for the year has to maintain a strict daily routine and a place in the house is demarcated and consecrated for the deity. The Jagar is sung by the Jagaris or Bhallas of the Rajput caste who are professional bards. The playing of drums is central to the festivities and this is done by drummers of the Das community, the lowest caste, whose status is elevated during the performance.

The festival ends with a feast where the prasada of the deity is distributed as a sacrament.

== Threatened and unique tradition ==
Ramman combines the sacred and the social, the ritualistic with revelry and expresses the history, faith, lifestyle, fears and hopes of the Saloor Dungra villagers through a mesh of oral, literary, visual, kinetic and traditional craft forms. It is an annual affair that children learn by watching. The various skills it involves in terms of dance, singing and drumming are passed down across hereditary communities orally. The onslaught of globalization and technology and lack of financial or artistic compensation have adversely impacted the ritual and traditional performances of the Ramman. Being peripheral to mainstream art forms, the awareness of the Ramman beyond its immediate borders is small and it stands the risk of becoming extinct in time.

People wearing the masks of deities and other characters, carved out of the stem of Bhoj tree (Betula Utilis) was performed by the villagers. It was introduced to the world by IGNCA (Indira Gandhi National Centre for Arts), Delhi in 2008. After that festival, gained a lot of popularity among people.

In 2009, UNESCO inscribed Ramman on its Representative List of the Intangible Cultural Heritage of Humanity.

Ramman Mahotsav was an important attraction in the 67th Republic Day parade of India and celebrations on 26 January 2016. In these exhibits, the cultural richness and diversity of Ramman Mahotsav was added and the traditions and heritage of the Uttarakhand region was displayed.
