= Dhari Devi =

Hindu Temple in Uttarakhand

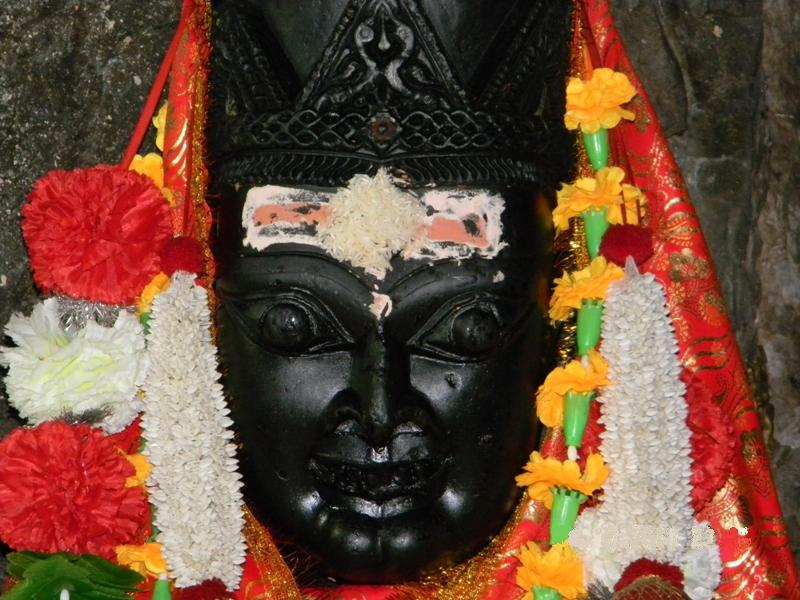

- Location in Uttarakhand

Religion
- Affiliation: Hinduism
- District: Srinagar, Uttarakhand; Pauri Garhwal
- Deity: Kali (Dhari Devi)
- Festival: Navaratri

Location
- Location: Kalyasaur
- State: Uttarakhand
- Country: India
- Coordinates: 30.214°N 78.77592°E

Architecture
- Type: North Indian architecture
- Elevation: 560 m (1,837 ft)

Dhari Devi a Hindu temple located on the banks of the Alaknanda River between Srinagar and Pauri Garhwal in the Garhwal Region of Uttarakhand, India. The temple is home to the upper half of the idol of the goddess Dhari, while the lower half of the idol is located in Kalimath, where she is worshipped as a manifestation of the Goddess Kali.

She is considered to be the guardian deity of Uttarakhand and is revered as the protector of the Char Dham's. Her shrine is one of 108 Shakta pithas in India, as numbered by Srimad Devi Bhagwat.

== 2013 Uttarakhand floods ==
On June 16, 2013 the original temple of the goddess was removed and shifted to the concrete platform at a height of about 611 metres from the Alaknanda river, to give way to the construction of the 330 MW Alaknanda Hydro Electric Dam built by Alaknanda Hydro Power Company Ltd (AHPCL), a subsidiary of infrastructure major.

Hours after the idol was moved, the region faced what would become one of the country's worst natural disasters since the 2004 tsunami. The 2013 North India floods were caused by a multi-day cloudburst resulting in devastating floods and landslides washing away the entire shrine town and killing hundreds of people. Locals and devotees believe, Uttarakhand had to face the Goddess' ire as she was shifted from her 'mool sthan' (original abode) to make way for a 330 MW hydel project that was left in ruins after the flood. A similar attempt in 1882 by a local king had resulted in a landslide that had flattened Kedarnath.

A new temple was constructed at its original location.

== Etymology ==
There is no clear evidence of the origin and construction of the first temple of Dhari Devi. However the construction of this temple is deeply rooted with a mythological story.

As per the story, Maa Dhari Devi was the youngest sister among seven brothers. After the death of parents, brother took good care of her and she also loved them a lot. After some time an Astrologer visited her home and told her brothers that her presence will bring misfortune to their house.

After a series of misfortunes in their house, the brothers decided to kill her. They slaughtered her in two parts and threw her in the river.

It is believed that the upper half floated and reached to Kalyasaur village where this temple is now located and spotted by a washerman. He got the instruction to put the upper half on a rock, where the temple was later on created, while the lower half floated toward the place where modern Kalimath temple is located.

== Gallery ==
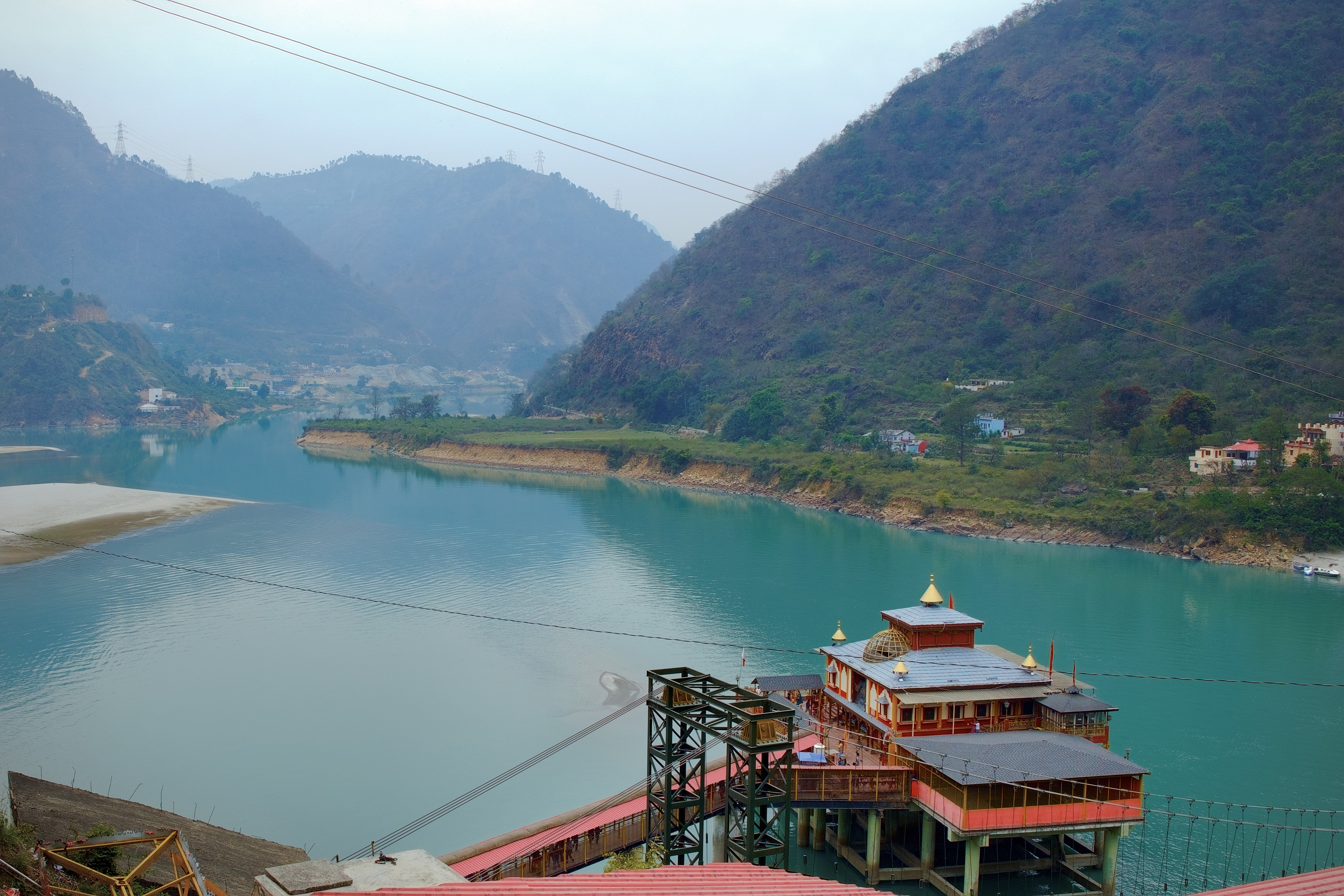
Dhari Devi Temple 2026

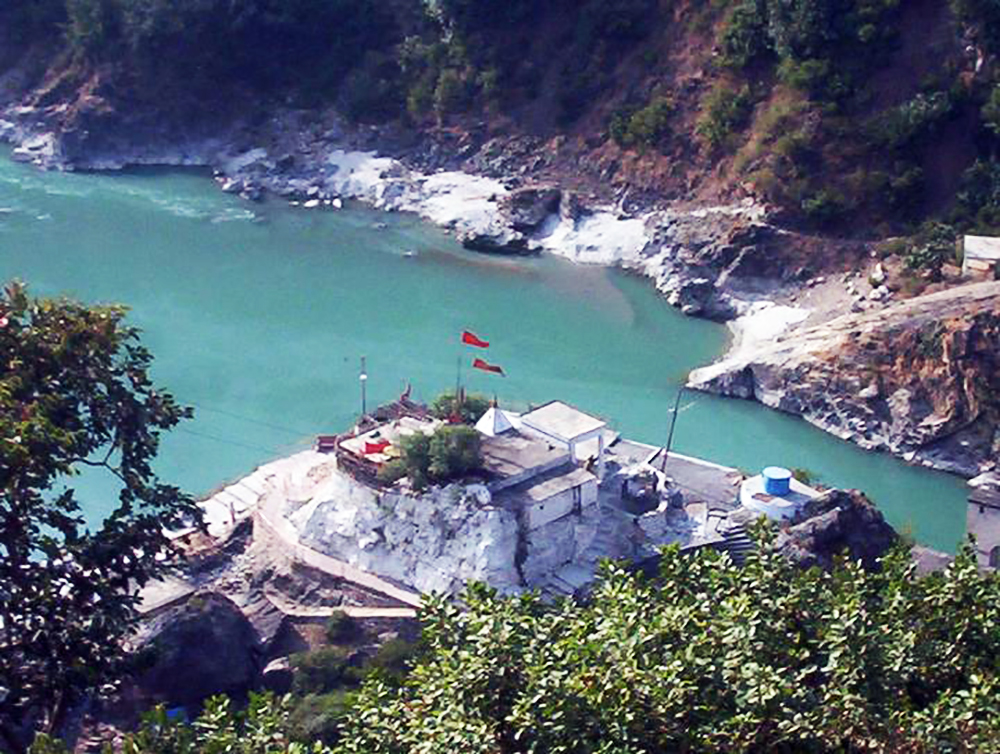
Dhari Devi Temple Jan 2002

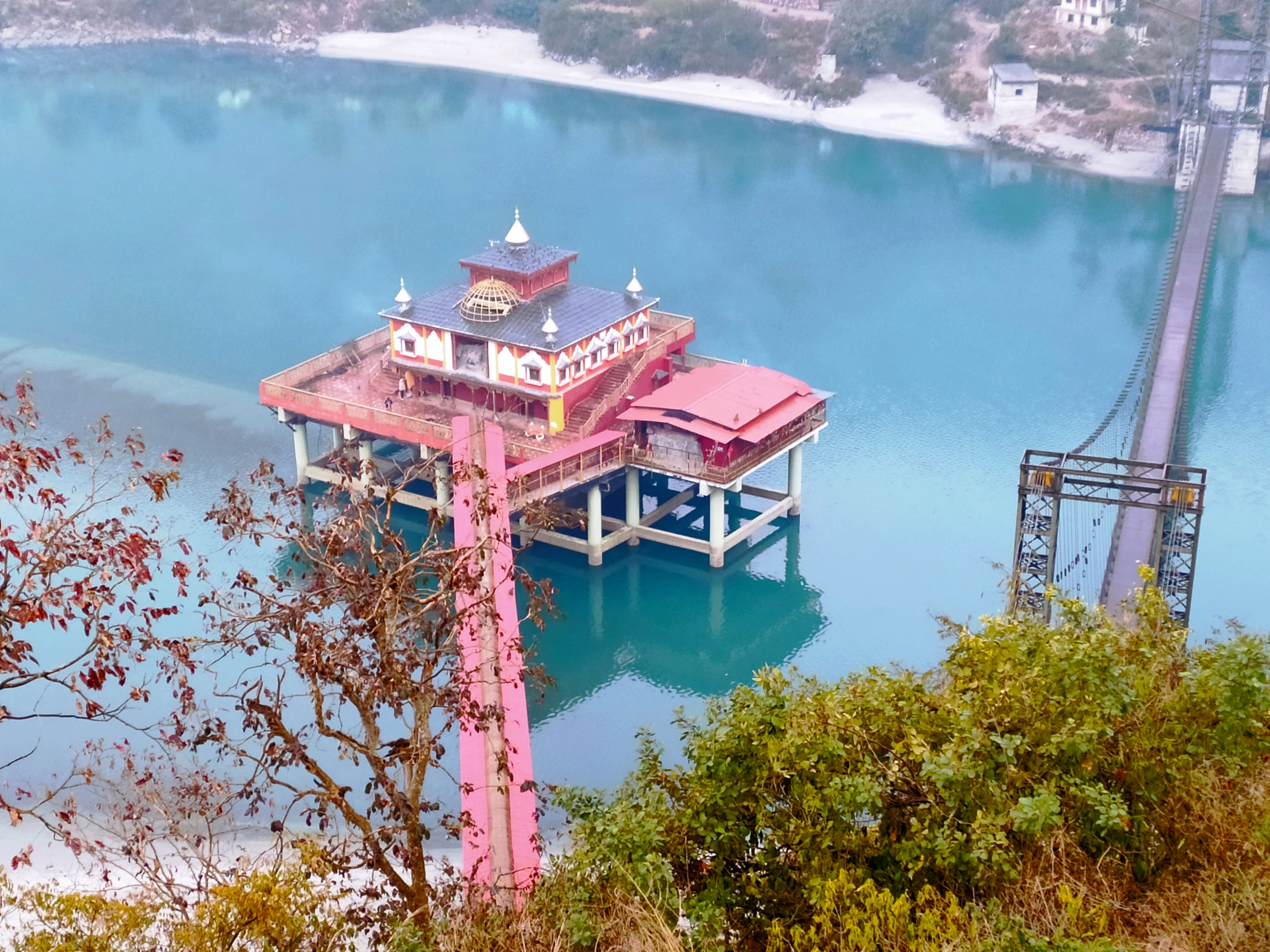
'Dhari Devi Temple in 2021
