= Srinagar, Uttarakhand =

Srinagar
- City
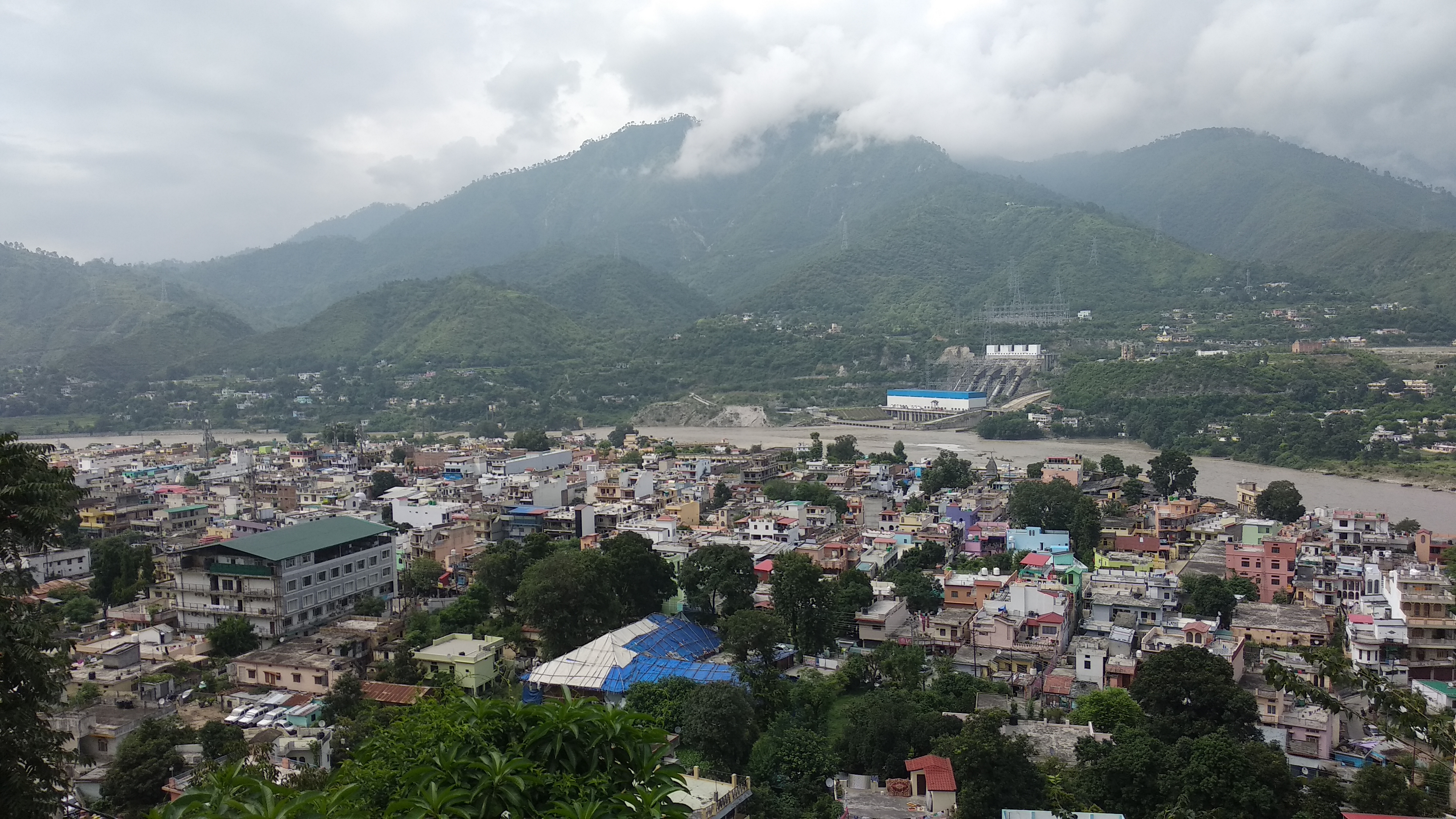
- View of Srinagar, Pauri Garhwal, Uttarakhand

- Location in Uttarakhand, India Srinagar (India)
- Coordinates: 30.22°N 78.78°E
- Country: India
- State: Uttarakhand
- District: Pauri Garhwal

Government
  - Type: Municipal Corporation
  - Body: Srinagar Municipal Corporation
  - Mayor: Arti Bhandari (Independent)
  - Lok Sabha MP: Anil Baluni (BJP)
  - MLA: Dhan Singh Rawat (BJP)

Area
  - Total: 1,257 km^{2} (485 sq mi)
- Elevation: 560 m (1,840 ft)

Population (2011)
  - Total: 20,115
  - Density: 30.16/km^{2} (78.1/sq mi)

Languages
  - Official: Hindi
  - Native: Garhwali
  - Literacy: 92%
- Time zone: UTC+5:30 (IST)
- PIN: 246174
- Telephone code: 01346-2
- Vehicle registration: UK 12 xx xxxx
- Website: pauri.nic.in

Srinagar is a city and municipal corporation in Pauri Garhwal district in the Indian state of Uttarakhand. It is located about 33 km from Pauri town, the administrative headquarters of Pauri Garhwal district, Uttarakhand, India.

== Geography ==
Srinagar is located at 30.22°N 78.78°E. at the left bank of Alaknanda river. It has an average elevation of 560 metres (1,837 feet). It is reached by national highway NH58 from Rishikesh, Srinagar is about 104 km from Rishikesh which is the last city on the plains of Uttarakhand and from where the mountains start. Srinagar can also be reached via Kotdwara, from Kotdwara it takes maximum 5 hours to reach there. It is a municipal corporation in the Pauri district of uttarakhand.

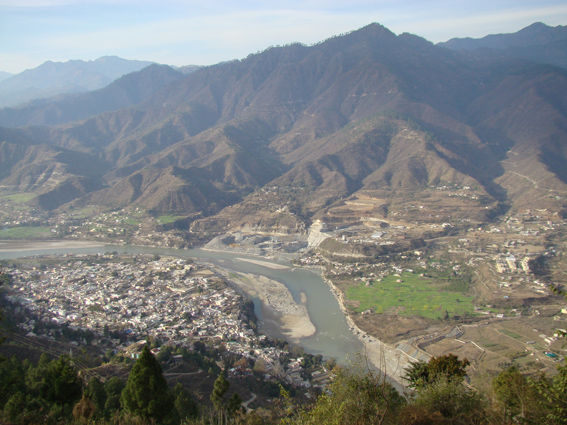
Srinagar from southern hill

== Geology ==
Srinagar city mainly rests over the Quaternary fluvial terraces of boulders and sand deposited by Alaknanda river. The hard rock under these boulder-sand terraces is the Proterozoic phyllite called Pauri Phyllite. This highly fractured Pauri Phyllite of Chandpur Formation (Jaunsar Group) is separated from the quartzite and limestone of Rudraprayag Formation by the North Almora Thrust (NAT), sometimes also called Srinagar Thrust.

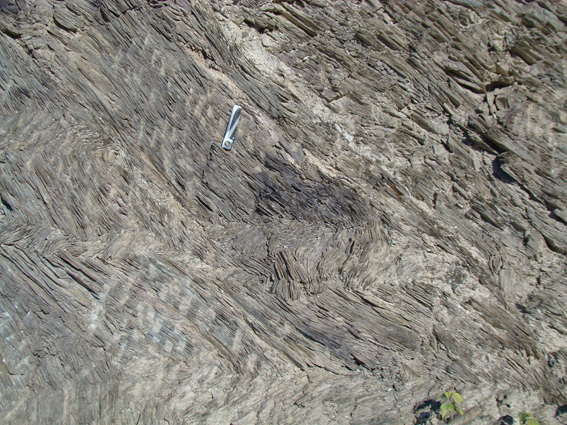
Fractured phyllite rock of Srinagar

== History ==
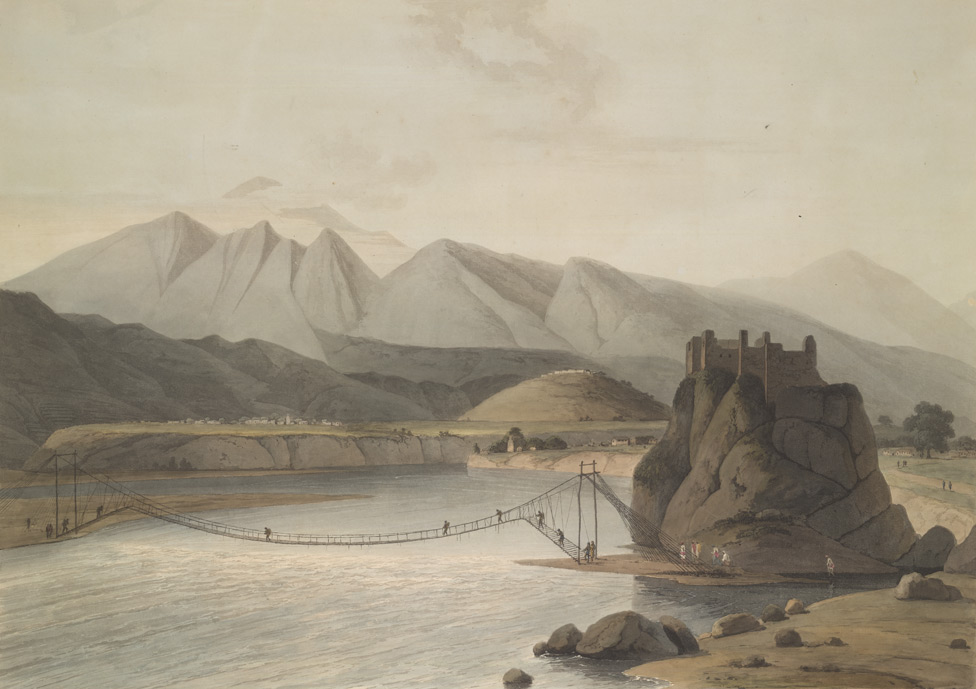
Rope bridge across Alaknanda River, Srinagar, in the times of Garhwal Kingdom, 1784–94

Srinagar came into limelight after becoming the capital of Garhwal Kingdom. King Ajay Pal with unifying the various chiefdoms and garhis (small counties) of this region during 1506–1512 CE founded the Garhwal kingdom and shifted the capital to Srinagar place from Chandpur Garhi.

The Gorkhas defeated the Nepali king and occupied Kathmandu. This emboldened them and they turned westward and attacked Kumaon and Garhwal in 1803. Raja Pradyumna Shah of Garhwal was defeated and killed in January 1804. Srinagar was under Gorkha rule from 1806 to 1815 CE. After the Gorkhas were defeated by the British, Srinagar became a part of British Garhwal.

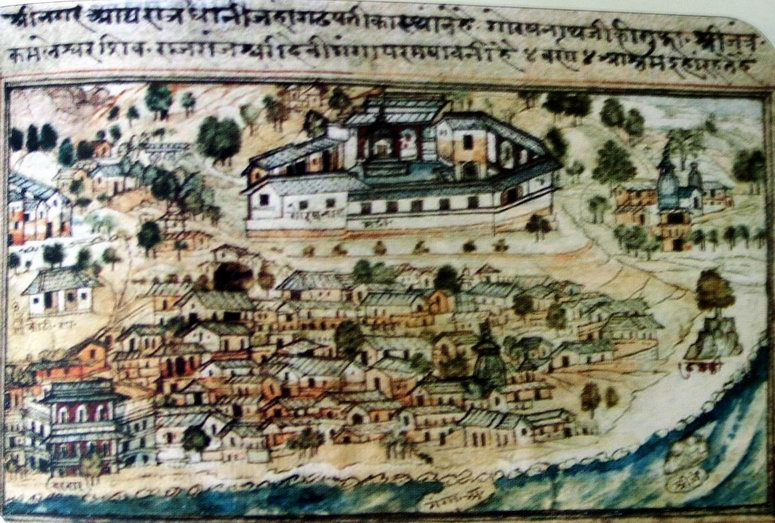
Painting of the old-city of Srinagar, Garhwal by Jwala Ram, Garhwal, ca.1788–1848

The old Srinagar city was destroyed in the Gohna Lake dam-burst which destroyed all the old relics of the town.

Today the town is an important cultural and educational centre. Being placed in central Garhwal at a moderate height, it is an important Valley Bazar in the hills. It has a number of temples and monuments and places for tourists to stay and visit.

== Climate ==
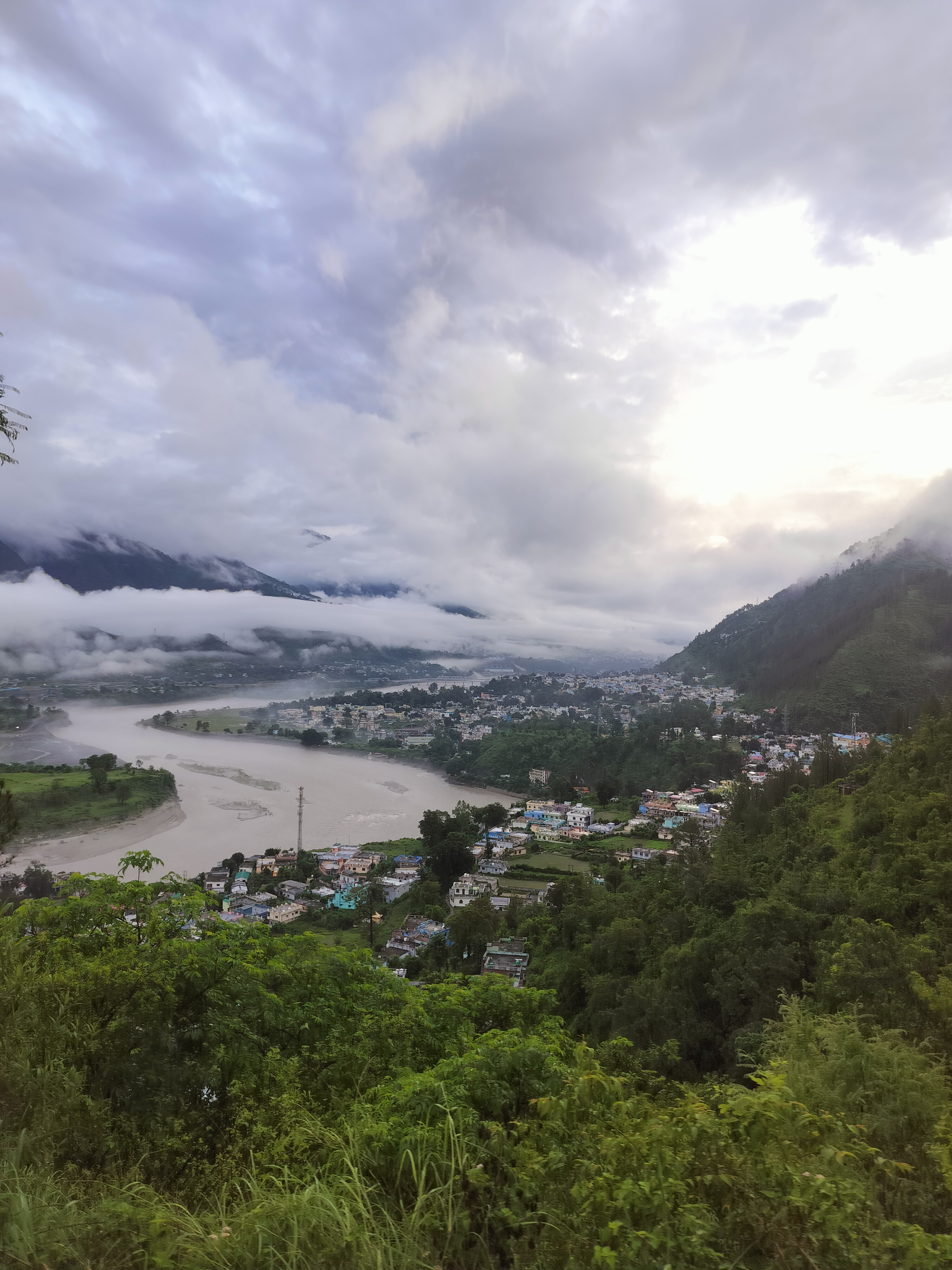
Srinagar Garhwal in Monsoons

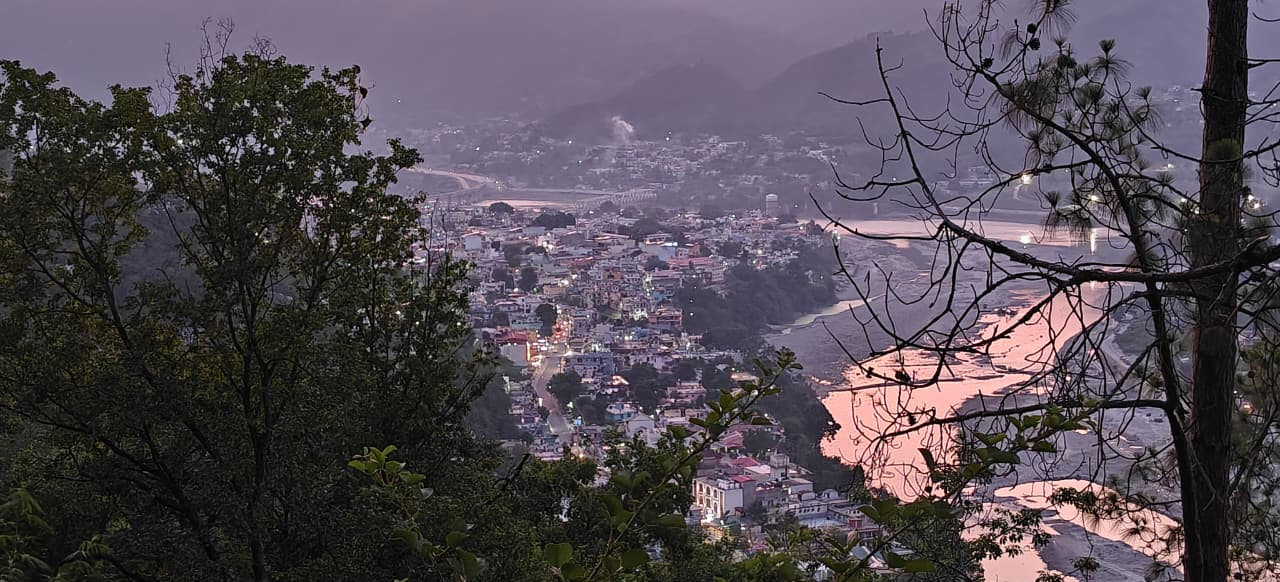
Srinagar Garhwal view in evening

Srinagar's location in a valley flanked by high mountains means the city sees large annual temperature variations. Daytime high temperatures can exceed 44 °C (111 °F) between May and July, and the city sees the hottest summers of anywhere in the Garhwal Himalaya. On the coldest days of the year, which come mostly in December and January, the daytime high temperature sometimes does not exceed 2 °C (36 °F).

== Education ==
Hemwati Nandan Bahuguna Garhwal University (renamed after Hemvati Nandan Bahuguna in 1989), established in 1973, is situated at Srinagar. The University has jurisdiction over seven districts of the Garhwal region. It was made a Central University in 2009 by the Central Universities Act, 2009. It has two other teaching campuses at Pauri and Tehri towns. It is a residential cum affiliating institution of higher learning with more than 180 affiliated colleges.

National Institute of Technology, Uttarakhand opened in 2010.

Srinagar Base Hospital Medical college with MBBS and MS courses having more than 500 students, is also situated at Srikot about 5 km from Srinagar towards Joshimath.

One ITI and one Polytechnic along with one B.Ed. college are other educational institutes in Srinagar.

Sashastra Seema Bal (SSB) Cadets Training Academy is also operating here for long.It is now functioning as Centralised Training Center or CTC.

St. Theresa's School which is an English medium school is situated near Alaknanda river. Sri Guru Ram Rai(SGRR) is another school in Srinagar which is located near Kamleshwar Mahadev Mandir.

There are many schools affiliated to CBSE, CISCE and UBSE Boards in this town.

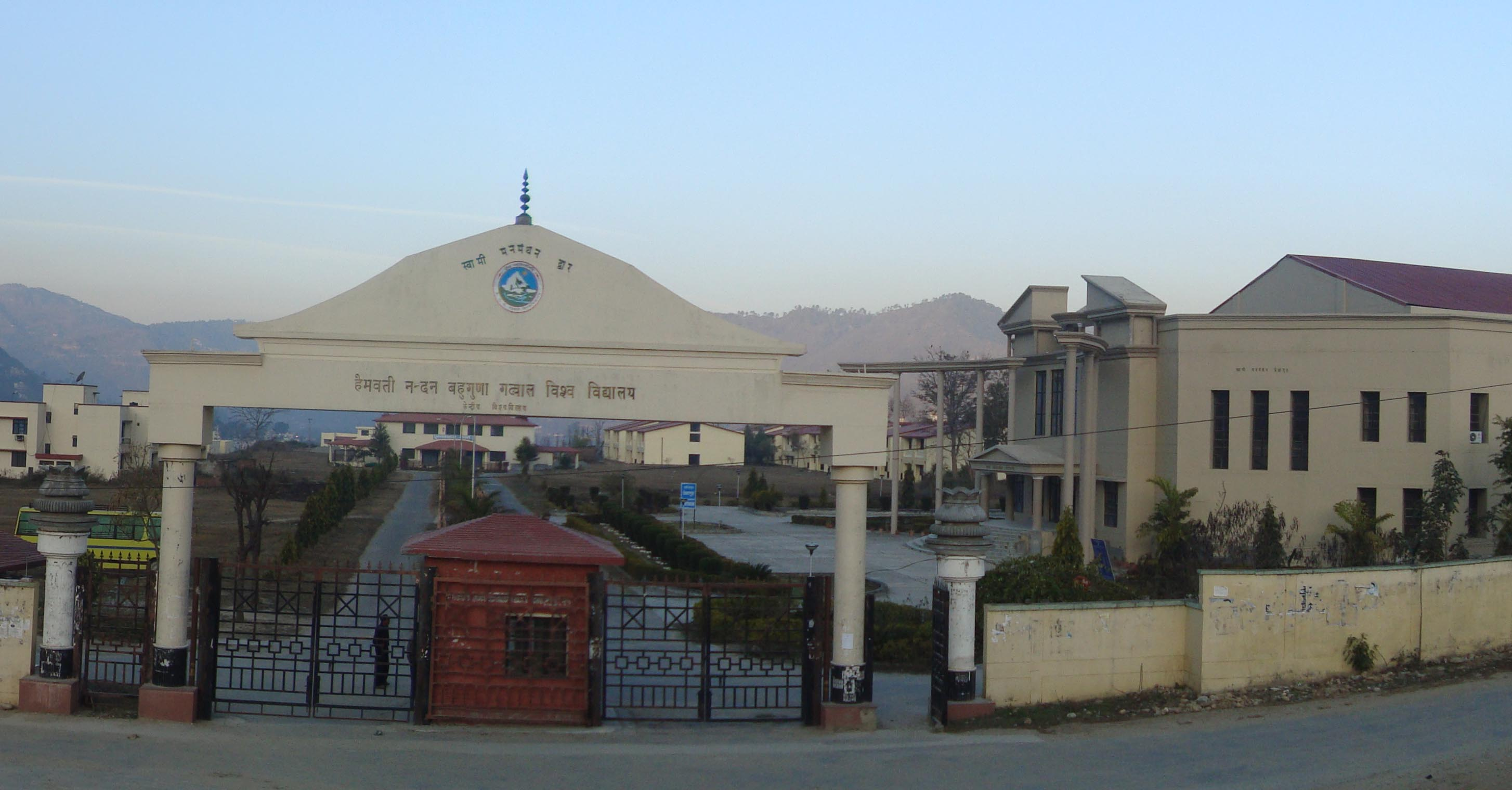
Campus of HNB Garhwal University

The literacy rate of Srinagar city is 92.03%, which is higher than the state average of 78.82%. In Srinagar, male literacy rate is 94.22% and the female literacy rate is 89.51%.

== Transportation ==
=== Railways ===
Till date Srinagar Garhwal has nearest railway stations either at Kotdwara or at Rishikesh. But A Centre-State train project is undergone to link Char Dham of Garhwal. After finishing of project Srinagar Garhwal will have three consequent railway stations.

- Sri-Kedar:

or Maletha-Janasu Railway station.

- Srinagar:

or Naithana-Chauras Railway station.

- Srikot:

or Sueet-Dhari Railway Station.

== Politics ==
=== Governing body ===
Srinagar is administered through a municipal corporation Srinagar Garhwal.

== Religious Sites ==
=== Shri Rishabhdev Digambar Jain Mandir, Srinagar ===
Shri Rishabhdev Digambar Jain Mandir is a Digambara Jain temple located in Srinagar, in the Pauri Garhwal district of Uttarakhand, India. The temple is dedicated to Rishabhanatha (Adinath), the first Tirthankara in Jainism, and also houses images of Parshvanatha, the twenty-third Tirthankara.

==== History ====
Earlier temple and the 1894 flood

A Jain temple existed in the old settlement of Srinagar before the 1894 flood. The flood destroyed the earlier temple, after which a new temple was constructed in the relocated settlement. Accounts of the temple's history state that the images from the earlier shrine survived the disaster.

==== Reconstruction (1911–1924) ====
Construction of the present temple began in 1911 and was completed in 1924. Lala Pratap Singh Jain and Lala Manohar Lal Jain are reported to have contributed jointly to its reconstruction.

The reconstructed temple became a place of worship for the Digambara Jain community in the Garhwal region. Its architectural features include carved stonework and decorative details.

==== Architecture and images ====
The temple houses images of Rishabhanatha and Parshvanatha in its principal shrine. The main images are described as being seated on a four-legged throne, with decorative features associated with Rajasthani architectural styles.

One account describes three seated images on the principal altar: one of Rishabhanatha and two of Parshvanatha. The images have been estimated in a community account to be approximately 1,500 years old; however, their precise age has not been independently established.

=== Dhari Devi Temple ===
Main Page Dhari Devi

Dhari Devi is a Hindu temple dedicated to Goddess Dhari Devi, a form of Kali, located on the banks of the Alaknanda River in the Pauri Garhwal district of Uttarakhand, India. The temple lies between Srinagar and Rudraprayag and is an important place of worship in the Garhwal region. Dhari Devi is traditionally revered as a guardian deity of Uttarakhand and is associated with the protection of the Char Dham pilgrimage sites.
