= Pradyumna Shah =

Ruler of Garhwal Uttarakhand

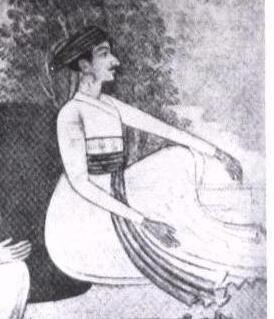
- Portrait of Raja Pradyumna Shah, Garhwal, ca.1785

Raja of Garhwal
- Reign: 1785 – 14 May 1804
- Enthronement: 1785

Raja of Kumaon
- Reign: 1779 – 1785
- Enthronement: 1779
- Died: 14 May 1804; Pauri Garhwal, Dehradun, Uttarakhand
- Dynasty: Panwar Dynasty
- Religion: Hinduism

Pradyumna Shah or Pradyuman Shah, also known as Pradyumna Chand, was the 54th ruler of the Panwar Dynasty and the last independent monarch of the Kingdom of Garhwal. Before that he had also served as the raja of the Kingdom of Kumaon until he was defeated and expelled. He reigned over Garhwal from 1785 to 14 May 1804, until his defeat to the Gurkha forces after the Battle of Khurbura occurred near Dehradun.

== Background and life ==
Maharaja Pradyuman was possibly placed on the throne from 1785 to 1804. Before ruling the Garhwal, he was enthroned as the Raja of Kumaon from 1779 to 1785. During the Coronation ceremony, he was given the name "Pradyman Chand" under which he initially began ruling the territory. The Maharaja was defeated and expelled from Kumaon by Raja Mohan Chand. He was then placed on the throne of Garhwal where he started administering Garhwal.

== Death ==
When Pradyuman's became the king of Garhwal, his kingdom came under the attack of Gurkhas. The king along with his 10,000 soldiers fought the battle when Gorkhas infiltrated through Kotdwara. After 13 days-long battle, the king died on 14 May 1804 while trying to save his kingdom.
